= 36th Indian Brigade =

- Active: December 1915 – June 1921
- Country: British India
- Allegiance: British Crown
- Branch: British Indian Army
- Type: Infantry
- Size: Brigade
- Part of: 14th Indian Division; North Persia Force
- Engagements: First World War Mesopotamian Campaign Battle of Dujaila Second Battle of Kut Fall of Baghdad (1917)

Commanders
- Notable commanders: Br.-Gen. H.F. Bateman-Champain

The 36th Indian Brigade was an infantry brigade of the British Indian Army that saw active service with the Indian Army during the First World War. It took part in the Mesopotamian campaign and later formed part of the North Persia Force. It remained with the Force until withdrawn in June 1921.

== History ==
Formation

The 36th Indian Brigade was formed in December 1915 in Mesopotamia. It was heavily involved in the attempts to relieve the 6th (Poona) Division besieged in Kut, including the Attack on the Dujaila Redoubt (8 March 1916).

14th Indian Division

In May 1916, the brigade joined the newly formed 14th Indian Division and remained with it until June 1918. It took part in a large number of small actions: the Advance to the Hai and Capture of the Khudaira Bend (14 December 1916 – 19 January 1917), the Capture of the Hai Salient (25 January – 5 February 1917), the Capture of the Dahra Bend (9 – 16 February), the Capture of Sannaiyat (17 – 24 February), the Passage of the Tigris (23 – 24 February), the Second Action of Jabal Hamrin (16 – 20 October), and the Third Action of Jabal Hamrin (3 – 6 December 1917).

North Persia Force

In June 1918, the brigade joined the North Persia Force and remained with it until June 1921. It was replaced in the 14th Indian Division by the 56th Indian Brigade.

== Order of battle ==
The brigade had the following composition in the First World War:

- 1/6th Battalion, Devonshire Regiment (joined from Lahore; to Corps Troops in October 1916)
- 26th Punjabis (joined in February 1916 from Bannu Brigade; left in August 1918 to join Persian Lines of Communications)
- 62nd Punjabis (joined in February 1916 from 9th (Sirhind) Brigade, 3rd (Lahore) Division; left in August 1918 to join Persian Lines of Communications)
- 82nd Punjabis (joined in February 1916 from 2nd (Nowshera) Brigade, 1st (Peshawar) Division; transferred in August 1918 to 37th Indian Brigade)
- 1/4th Battalion, Hampshire Regiment (joined in October 1916 from Corps Troops) (Note: One company of the 1/4th Battalion, Hampshire Regiment was attached to the 30th Indian Brigade when it was captured at Kut on 29 April 1916. On 12 February 1916, the rest of the battalion formed the Composite Territorial Battalion with the 1/5th (The Weald of Kent) Battalion, Buffs (East Kent Regiment) and joined 35th Indian Brigade. Both battalions were part of the Territorial Force, hence the title. They resumed their separate existence in May 1916 and 1/4th Battalion, Hampshire Regiment transferred to Corps Troops in July.)
- 1st Battalion, 2nd King Edward's Own Gurkha Rifles (The Sirmoor Rifles) (joined in August 1918 from 37th Indian Brigade)
- 1st Battalion, 6th Gurkha Rifles (joined in August 1918 from Corps Troops)
- 36th Sikhs (joined in August 1918 from Corps Troops)
- 186th Machine Gun Company (joined in August 1916)
- 36th Light Trench Mortar Battery ('K' Light Trench Mortar Battery joined 14th Division in September 1917 and assigned to the brigade in February 1918)

== Commanders ==
The brigade had the following commanders:

From	Rank	Name
29 December 1915	Brigadier-General	G. Christian
1 October 1916	Brigadier-General	L.B. Walton
6 August 1917	Brigadier-General	H.F. Bateman-Champain

== Bibliography ==
- James, Brigadier E.A. (1978). British Regiments 1914–18. London: Samson Books Limited. ISBN 0-906304-03-2.
- Perry, F.W. (1993). Order of Battle of Divisions Part 5B. Indian Army Divisions. Newport: Ray Westlake Military Books. ISBN 1-871167-23-X.
