= 56th Indian Brigade =

- Active: 10 March 1918 – 1919
- Country: British India
- Allegiance: British Crown
- Branch: British Indian Army
- Type: Infantry
- Size: Brigade
- Part of: 14th Indian Division
- Engagements: First World War Mesopotamian Campaign

The 56th Indian Brigade was an infantry brigade of the British Indian Army that saw active service with the Indian Army during the First World War. It took part in the Mesopotamian campaign and was disbanded shortly after the end of the war. It was not reformed for the Second World War.

== History ==
The 56th Indian Brigade was formed in March 1918 in Mesopotamia. It joined the 14th Indian Division in August 1918 to replace the 36th Indian Brigade which had departed for the North Persia Force. It did not take part in any significant actions.

At the end of the war, the 14th Division was rapidly demobilized. The 35th and 37th Indian Brigades were broken up in February 1919, and the 56th Indian Brigade followed later in the year.

== Order of battle ==
The brigade had the following composition in the First World War:

- 1/4th Battalion, Prince Albert's (Somerset Light Infantry) (joined in March 1918 from Corps Troops)
- 1st Battalion, 42nd Deoli Regiment (joined in March 1918 from Corps Troops)
- 95th Russell's Infantry (joined in March 1918 from Corps Troops; left in September to join British 22nd Division)
- 104th Wellesley's Rifles (joined in March 1918 from Corps Troops)
- 1st Patiala Lancers (attached March to June 1918)
- 2nd Indian Machine Gun Company (joined in June 1918)
- 56th Light Trench Mortar Battery

== Commander ==
The brigade was commanded from 10 March 1918 by Brigadier-General E.C. Tidswell.

== Bibliography ==
- Kempton, Chris (2003b). 'Loyalty & Honour', The Indian Army September 1939 – August 1947. Vol. Part II Brigades. Milton Keynes: The Military Press. ISBN 0-85420-238-2.
- Perry, F.W. (1993). Order of Battle of Divisions Part 5B. Indian Army Divisions. Newport: Ray Westlake Military Books. ISBN 1-871167-23-X.
