= 14th Indian Division =

- Active: 12 May 1916 – February 1919
- Country: British India
- Allegiance: British Crown
- Branch: British Indian Army
- Type: Infantry
- Size: Division
- Part of: III Corps
- Engagements: World War I Mesopotamian campaign Second Battle of Kut Fall of Baghdad (1917)

Commanders
- Notable commanders: Sir William Montgomerie Thomson

The 14th Indian Division was formed during World War I, for service in the Mesopotamian Campaign. It was composed of battalions of the Regular British Army, the British Territorial Force and the British Indian Army.

== History ==
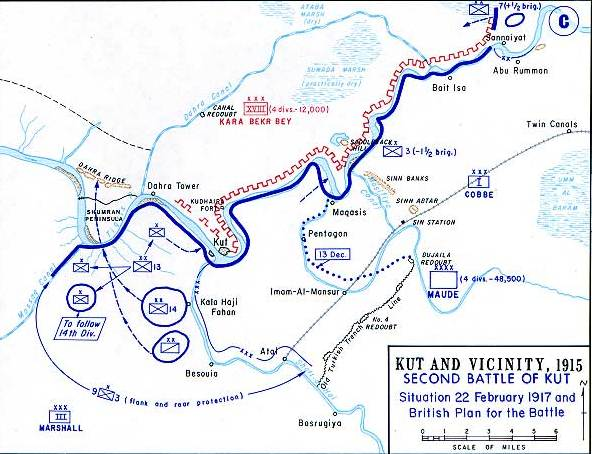
Map showing the 14th Division movements

The Division now part of the Tigris Corps was involved in a number on minor engagements the Second Battle of Kut and the Fall of Baghdad, the Division's 36th Brigade was left in Baghdad as the Garrison.

The Division remained in Mesopotamia until the Armistice of Mudros 31 October 1918.

== Order of battle ==
The division commanded the following units, although not all of them served at the same time:

=== 35th Indian Brigade ===
- 1/5th Battalion, Buffs (East Kent Regiment)
- 37th Dogras
- 102nd King Edward's Own Grenadiers
- 2nd Battalion, 4th Gurkha Rifles

=== 36th Indian Brigade ===
Departed for the North Persia Force in June 1918, replaced by 56th Indian Brigade

- 1/4th Battalion, Hampshire Regiment
- 26th Punjabis
- 62nd Punjabis
- 82nd Punjabis

=== 37th Indian Brigade ===
- 1st Battalion, 2nd King Edward's Own Gurkha Rifles (The Sirmoor Rifles)
- 36th Sikhs
- 64th Pioneers
- 1/4th Battalion, Devonshire Regiment
- 45th Rattray's Sikhs
- 2nd Battalion, Norfolk Regiment
- 2nd Battalion, 9th Gurkha Rifles
- 1st Battalion, 67th Punjabis
- 82nd Punjabis
- 185th Machine Gun Company
- 37th Light Trench Mortar Battery

=== 56th Indian Brigade ===
Joined in August 1918 to replace 36th Indian Brigade

- 1/4th Battalion, Prince Albert's (Somerset Light Infantry)
- 1st Battalion, 42nd Deoli Regiment
- 95th Russell's Infantry
- 104th Wellesley's Rifles
- 1st Patiala Lancers (attached March to June 1918)
- 2nd Indian Machine Gun Company
- 56th Light Trench Mortar Battery

=== Artillery ===
- 13th Brigade Royal Field Artillery
- C/69th Howitzer battery

=== Battles ===
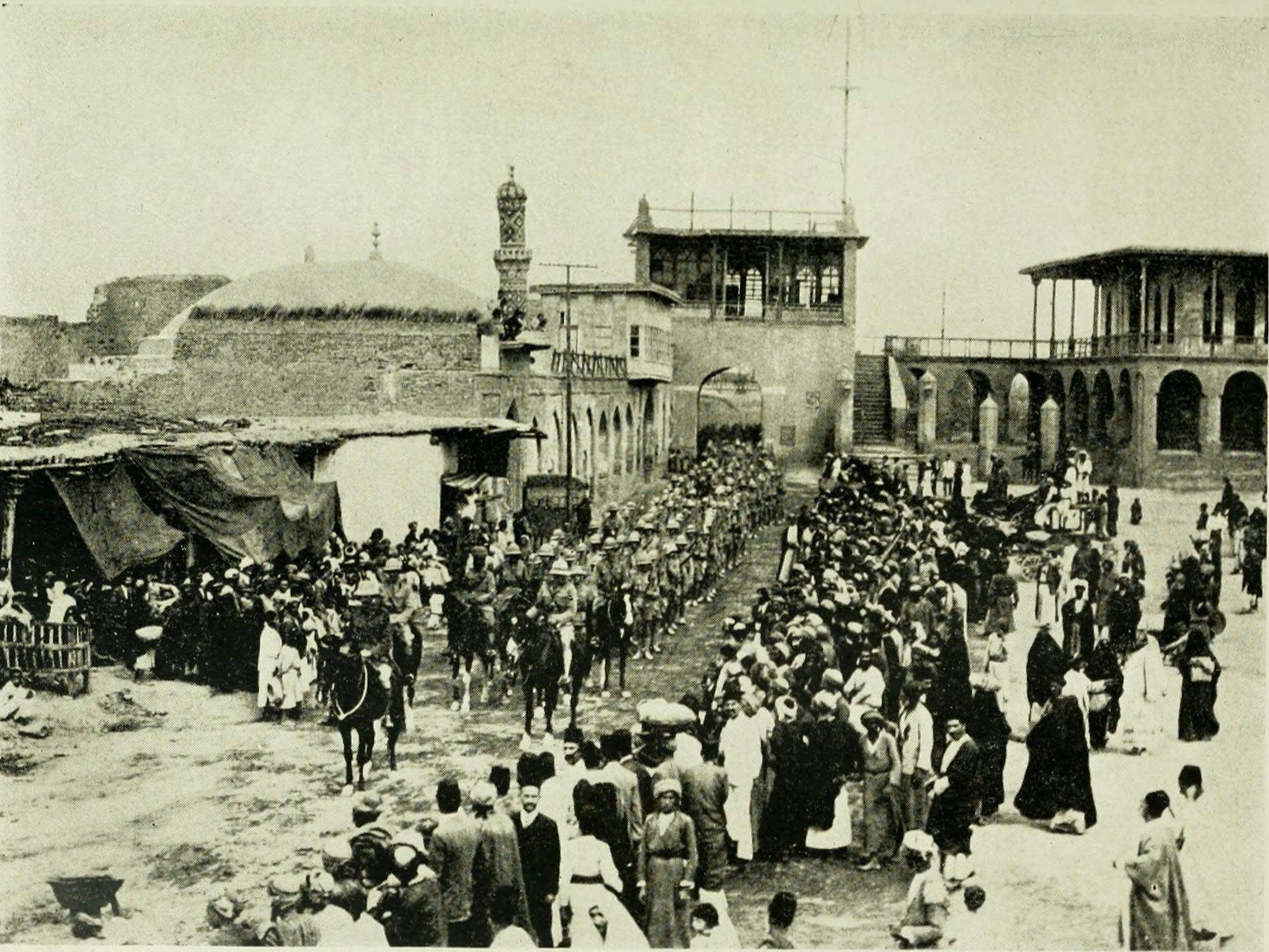
Troops entering Baghdad

- Advance to the Hai and capture of the Khudaira Bend. 14 December 1916.
- Capture of the Hai Salient. 25 January – 5 February 1917.
- Capture of Sannaiyat. 17–24 February 1917.
- Second Battle of Kut. 23 February 1917
- Passage of the Tigris. 23–24 February 1917.
- Fall of Baghdad (1917). 8–11 March 1917
- Passage of the ‘Adhaim. 18 April 1917.
- Action of the Shatt al Adhaim. 30 April 1917.
- Second action of Jabal Hamrin. 16–20 October 1917.
- Third action of Jabal Hamrin. 3–6 December 1917.

== See also ==
- List of Indian divisions in World War I

== Bibliography ==
- Haythornthwaite, Philip J. (1996). The World War One Source Book. London: Arms and Armour Press. ISBN 1-85409-351-7.
- James, Brigadier E.A. (1978). British Regiments 1914–18. London: Samson Books Limited. ISBN 0-906304-03-2.
- Moberly, Frederick James (1927) [1923]. The Campaign in Mesopotamia 1914–1918. History of the Great War Based on Official Documents. Vol. I. London: HMSO. OCLC 772784341.
- Perry, F.W. (1993). Order of Battle of Divisions Part 5B. Indian Army Divisions. Newport: Ray Westlake Military Books. ISBN 1-871167-23-X.
