= 37th Indian Brigade =

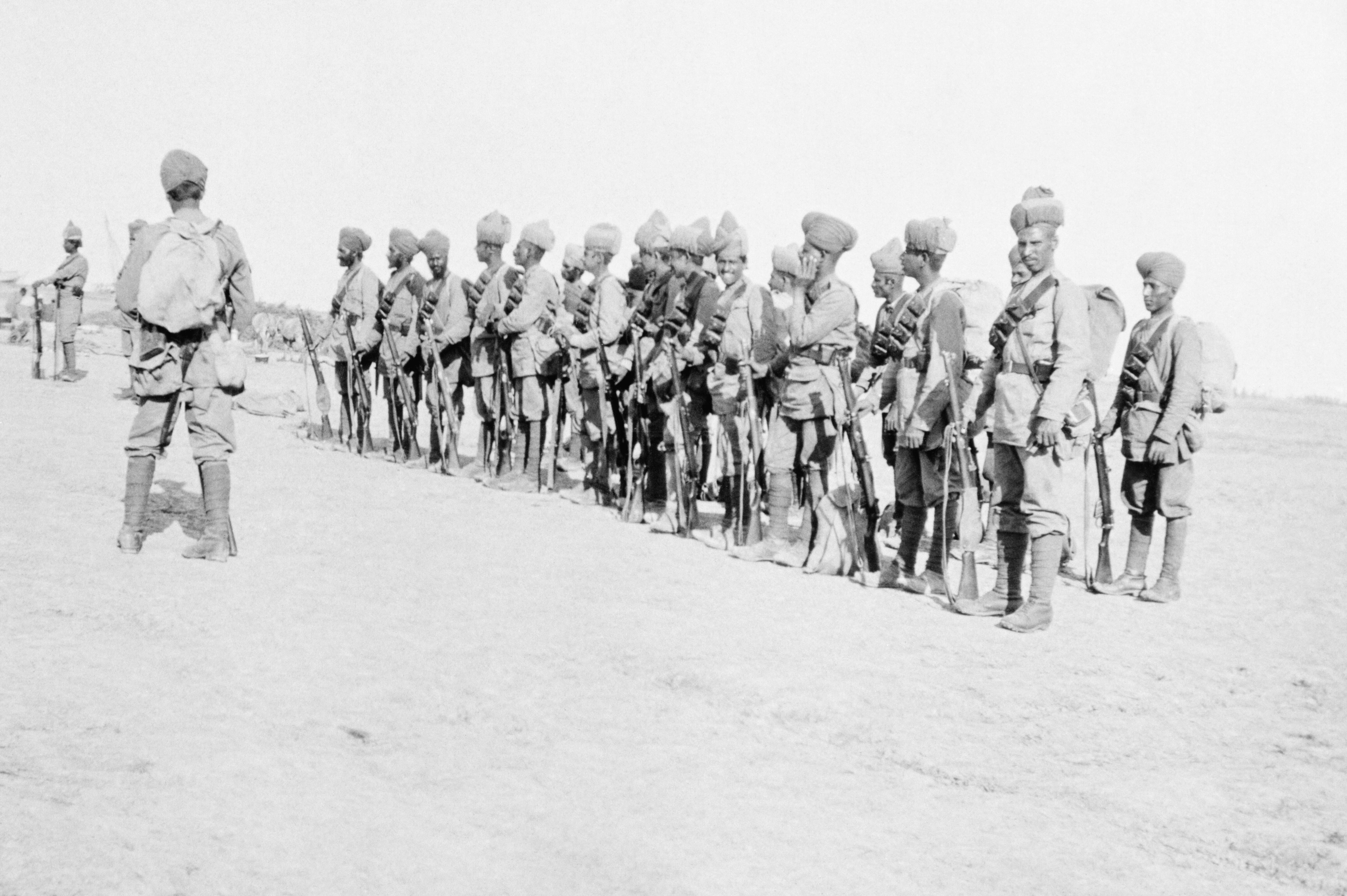
- 37th Indian Brigade at Basra in Mesopotamia, 1916
- Active: 14 February 1916 – February 1919
- Country: British India
- Allegiance: British Crown
- Branch: British Indian Army
- Type: Infantry
- Size: Brigade
- Part of: 3rd (Lahore) Division; 14th Indian Division
- Engagements: First World War Mesopotamian Campaign Battle of Dujaila Second Battle of Kut Fall of Baghdad (1917)

Commanders
- Notable commanders: Br.-Gen. F.J. Fowler

The 37th Indian Brigade was an infantry brigade of the British Indian Army that saw active service with the Indian Army during the First World War. It took part in the Mesopotamian campaign and was disbanded shortly after the end of the war.

== History ==
3rd (Lahore) Division

Units of the 37th Indian Brigade began to land at Basra on 21 January 1916 and the brigade was formed in the next month. It served in the Mesopotamian Campaign for the rest of the war. It was attached to the 3rd (Lahore) Division from March to April 1916. While with the division, it took part in the attempts to relieve the 6th (Poona) Division besieged in Kut, including the Attack on the Dujaila Redoubt (8 March) and the action of Bait Isa (17 – 18 April).

14th Indian Division

In May 1916, the brigade joined the newly formed 14th Indian Division. It remained with the division for the rest of the war and took part in a large number of small actions: the Advance to the Hai and Capture of the Khudaira Bend (14 December 1916 – 19 January 1917), the Capture of the Hai Salient (25 January – 5 February 1917), the Capture of the Dahra Bend (9 – 16 February), the Capture of Sannaiyat (17 – 24 February), the Passage of the Tigris (23 – 24 February), the Second Action of Jabal Hamrin (16 – 20 October), and the Third Action of Jabal Hamrin (3 – 6 December 1917).

At the end of the war, the 14th Division was rapidly demobilized and the 37th Indian Brigade was broken up in February 1919.

== Order of battle ==
The brigade had the following composition in the First World War:

- 1/4th Battalion, Prince Albert's (Somerset Light Infantry) (joined in February 1916 from 2nd (Nowshera) Brigade, 1st (Peshawar) Division; left for 41st Indian Brigade in May)
- 34th Sikh Pioneers (attached from 3rd (Lahore) Division from March to April 1916)
- 92nd Punjabis (joined in February 1916 from 22nd (Lucknow) Brigade, 10th Indian Division; left for 19th (Dehra Dun) Brigade, 7th (Meerut) Division in April)
- 1st Battalion, 2nd King Edward's Own Gurkha Rifles (The Sirmoor Rifles) (joined in February 1916 from Dehra Dun Brigade, 7th Meerut Divisional Area; left in April 1918 and in August joined 36th Indian Brigade)
- 36th Sikhs (joined in April 1916 from 1st (Peshawar) Brigade, 1st (Peshawar) Division; transferred to Corps Troops in February 1917)
- 64th Pioneers (joined in April 1916 from Jhansi Brigade, 5th (Mhow) Division; left for Corps Troops in June)
- 1/4th Battalion, Devonshire Regiment (joined on 5 May 1916 from 41st Indian Brigade; transferred to Corps Troops in February 1917)
- 45th Rattray's Sikhs (joined in June 1916 from 41st Indian Brigade; transferred to Corps Troops in February 1917)
- 2nd Battalion, Norfolk Regiment (joined from Corps Troops in February 1917)
- 2nd Battalion, 9th Gurkha Rifles (joined from Corps Troops in February 1917)
- 1st Battalion, 67th Punjabis (joined from Corps Troops in February 1917; left in April 1918 to join the 82nd Brigade in British 27th Division)
- 82nd Punjabis (transferred from 36th Indian Brigade in August 1918)
- 185th Machine Gun Company (joined in August 1916)
- 37th Light Trench Mortar Battery ('L' Light Trench Mortar Battery joined 14th Division in September 1917 and assigned to the brigade in February 1918)

== Commanders ==
The brigade had the following commanders:

| From | Rank | Name | Notes |
|---|---|---|---|
| 14 February 1916 | Brigadier-General | F.J. Fowler | wounded, 9 March 1916 |
| 10 March 1916 | Brigadier-General | S.M. Edwardes | |
| 1 April 1916 | Brigadier-General | F.J. Fowler | sick, 16 May 1916 |
| 16 May 1916 | Lieutenant-Colonel | O. Gunning | temporary |
| 30 May 1916 | Lieutenant-Colonel | F.T. Stewart | temporary |
| 10 June 1916 | Brigadier-General | F.J. Fowler | |
| 23 September 1916 | Brigadier-General | O.W. Carey | |
| 11 May 1917 | Brigadier-General | T.R. Maclachlan | |

== Bibliography ==
- Perry, F.W. (1993). Order of Battle of Divisions Part 5B. Indian Army Divisions. Newport: Ray Westlake Military Books. ISBN 1-871167-23-X.
