= 41st Indian Brigade =

- Active: 23 February 1916 – 19 March 1918
- Country: British India
- Allegiance: British Crown
- Branch: British Indian Army
- Type: Infantry
- Size: Brigade
- Part of: Independent
- Engagements: First World War Mesopotamian Campaign

The 41st Indian Brigade was an infantry brigade of the British Indian Army that saw service with the Indian Army during the First World War. It served in the Mesopotamian Campaign on the Euphrates Front throughout its existence. It was not reformed for the Second World War.

== History ==
The Headquarters 41st Indian Brigade was formed in February 1916 and arrived in Mesopotamia in the following month where it served as an independent formation. On 15 September 1916, it was redesignated as 41st Brigade & H.Q. Euphrates Defences at which time it commanded the 1/4th Battalion, Prince Albert's (Somerset Light Infantry), the 6th Jat Light Infantry and the 1st Battalion, 10th Gurkha Rifles. On 19 March 1918, it was further redesignated as H.Q. Euphrates Defences

== Order of battle ==
The brigade had the following composition in the First World War:

- 1st Battalion, 8th Gurkha Rifles (joined in March 1916 from Ambala Brigade, 3rd Lahore Divisional Area; transferred in April to 21st (Bareilly) Brigade, 7th (Meerut) Division)
- 1/4th Battalion, Devonshire Regiment (joined in April 1916 from 42nd Indian Brigade, 15th Indian Division; transferred in June to 37th Indian Brigade, 14th Indian Division)
- 2nd Battalion, 4th Gurkha Rifles (joined in April 1916 from Kohat Brigade; transferred in June to 35th Indian Brigade, 14th Indian Division)
- 45th Rattray's Sikhs (joined in April 1916 from Derajat Brigade; transferred in June to 37th Indian Brigade, 14th Indian Division)
- 126th Baluchistan Infantry (joined in April 1916 from Aden and Muscat; transferred in June to 4th (Quetta) Division) (Note: 126th Baluchistan Infantry served on Lines of Communications for the East Persia Cordon from June 1916 to July 1917.)
- 1/4th Battalion, Prince Albert's (Somerset Light Infantry) (joined on 5 May 1916 from 37th Indian Brigade, 14th Indian Division; transferred in October to Euphrates Defences) (Note: 1/4th Battalion, Prince Albert's (Somerset Light Infantry) remained with the brigade until March 1918.)
- 6th Jat Light Infantry (joined in June 1916 from 21st (Bareilly) Brigade, 7th (Meerut) Division; transferred in October to Euphrates Defences)
- 2nd Battalion, 103rd Mahratta Light Infantry (formed in June 1916 and transferred to Jubbulpore Brigade, 5th (Mhow) Division)
- 2nd Battalion, 10th Gurkha Rifles (joined in June 1916 from Egypt; transferred in July to Burma Division)
- 1st Battalion, 10th Gurkha Rifles (joined in September 1916 from Burma Division; transferred in October to Euphrates Defences)

== Commanders ==
The brigade had the following commanders:

From	Rank	Name	Notes
23 February 1916	Brigadier-General	A. Cadell	
9 August 1916	Lieutenant-Colonel	W.C. Cox	temporary
18 September	Brigadier-General	F.R.E. Lock	

== Bibliography ==
- James, Brigadier E.A. (1978). British Regiments 1914–18. London: Samson Books Limited. ISBN 0-906304-03-2.
- Kempton, Chris (2003b). 'Loyalty & Honour', The Indian Army September 1939 – August 1947. Vol. Part II Brigades. Milton Keynes: The Military Press. ISBN 0-85420-238-2.
- Perry, F.W. (1993). Order of Battle of Divisions Part 5B. Indian Army Divisions. Newport: Ray Westlake Military Books. ISBN 1-871167-23-X.
