= 35th Indian Brigade =

- Active: December 1915 – February 1919
- Country: British India
- Allegiance: British Crown
- Branch: British Indian Army
- Type: Infantry
- Size: Brigade
- Part of: 7th (Meerut) Division; 14th Indian Division
- Engagements: First World War Mesopotamian Campaign Battle of Sheikh Sa'ad Battle of Wadi (1916) Battle of Hanna Second Battle of Kut Fall of Baghdad (1917)

The 35th Indian Brigade was an infantry brigade of the British Indian Army that saw active service with the Indian Army during the First World War. It took part in the Mesopotamian campaign and was disbanded shortly after the end of the war. It was not reformed for the Second World War.

== History ==
7th (Meerut) Division

The 35th Indian Brigade was formed in December 1915 and arrived in Mesopotamia in the same month. It was attached to the 7th (Meerut) Division until February 1916. While with the division, it took part in the attempts to relieve the 6th (Poona) Division besieged in Kut, including the Action of Shaikh Saad (6 – 8 January 1916), the Action of the Wadi (13 January 1916) and the First attack on Hanna (21 January 1916).

14th Indian Division

In May 1916, the brigade joined the newly formed 14th Indian Division. It remained with the division for the rest of the war and took part in a large number of small actions: the Advance to the Hai and Capture of the Khudaira Bend (14 December 1916 – 19 January 1917), the Capture of the Hai Salient (25 January – 5 February 1917), the Capture of the Dahra Bend (9 – 16 February), the Capture of Sannaiyat (17 – 24 February), the Passage of the Tigris (23 – 24 February), the Passage of the Adhaim (18 April), the action of Adhaim (30 April), the Second Action of Jabal Hamrin (16 – 20 October), and the Third Action of Jabal Hamrin (3 – 6 December 1917).

At the end of the war, the 14th Division was rapidly demobilized and the 35th Indian Brigade was broken up in February 1919.

== Order of battle ==
The brigade had the following composition in the First World War:

- 1/5th (The Weald of Kent) Battalion, Buffs (East Kent Regiment) (left the Jubbulpore Brigade, 5th (Mhow) Division in November 1915 to join the brigade; remained with the brigade throughout)
- 37th Dogras (joined in December 1915 from 5th (Jhelum) Brigade, 2nd (Rawalpindi) Division; remained with the brigade throughout)
- 97th Deccan Infantry (left the Derajat Brigade in November 1915 to join the brigade; transferred to Corps Troops in June 1916)
- 102nd King Edward's Own Grenadiers (left the Poona Brigade, 6th Poona Divisional Area in November 1915 to join the brigade; remained with the brigade throughout except for a detachment to Corps Troops from May to December 1916)
- Composite Territorial Battalion (formed 12 February 1916, broken up May 1916) (Note: One company of the 1/4th Battalion, Hampshire Regiment was attached to the 30th Indian Brigade when it was captured at Kut on 29 April 1916. On 12 February 1916, the rest of the battalion formed the Composite Territorial Battalion with the 1/5th (The Weald of Kent) Battalion, Buffs (East Kent Regiment). Both battalions were part of the Territorial Force, hence the title. They resumed their separate existence in May 1916.)
- Composite Dogra Battalion (formed February 1916, broken up June 1916) (Note: 37th Dogras was joined by 41st Dogras from 21st (Bareilly) Brigade, 7th (Meerut) Division to form the Composite Dogra Battalion. They resumed their separate existence in June 1916.)
- 1/4th Battalion, Hampshire Regiment (reformed from the Composite Territorial Battalion in May 1916; transferred to Corps Troops in July)
- 3rd Brahmans (attached from Corp Troops from May to December 1916)
- 2nd Battalion, 4th Gurkha Rifles (joined from 41st Indian Brigade in June 1916; left in September 1918 to join the 81st Brigade in the British 27th Division)
- 185th Machine Gun Company (joined in August 1916)
- 35th Light Trench Mortar Battery ('J' Light Trench Mortar Battery joined 14th Division in September 1917 and assigned to the brigade in February 1918)

== Commanders ==
The brigade had the following commanders:

From	Rank	Name	Notes
1 December 1915	Brigadier-General	G.B.H. Rice	sick, 3 May 1916
22 May 1916	Brigadier-General	W.M. Thomson	
22 November 1916	Lieutenant-Colonel	G.M. Morris	temporary
6 January 1918	Brigadier-General	C.B.L. Cleary	

== Bibliography ==
- James, Brigadier E.A. (1978). British Regiments 1914–18. London: Samson Books Limited. ISBN 0-906304-03-2.
- Kempton, Chris (2003b). 'Loyalty & Honour', The Indian Army September 1939 – August 1947. Vol. Part II Brigades. Milton Keynes: The Military Press. ISBN 0-85420-238-2.
- Perry, F.W. (1993). Order of Battle of Divisions Part 5B. Indian Army Divisions. Newport: Ray Westlake Military Books. ISBN 1-871167-23-X.
