= Muscat rebellion =

Uprising in 1913 in Muscat and Oman

- Part of the Middle Eastern theatre of World War I
Date	May 1913 – 25 September 1920
Location	Muscat and Oman
Result	Stalemate, Treaty of Seeb

Belligerents
British Empire; Muscat and Oman	Imamate of Oman; Supported by: German Empire (1915-1918)

Commanders and leaders
Faisal bin Turki (Until Oct 1913); Taimur bin Feisal (From Oct 1913)	Sālim bin Rāshid al-Kharūṣī; Shaikh Isa ibn Salih; Shaikh Hamyar ibn Nasir

Strength
1,000 troops (1913) (British Empire) 256 troops (1913)	Unknown

The Muscat rebellion was an uprising in 1913 led by Sālim bin Rāshid al-Kharūṣī against the authority of the Sultans of Muscat and Oman. The rebels established their own state, the Ibāḍī imamate. Its causes lay in a deep-rooted rivalry between northern and southern tribes of Muscat and Oman. It began in May 1913 in Tanuf. On 5 June, the rebels captured Nizwa, and on 20 June they captured Izki. By this time, the rebels had also surrounded Samail. On 24 June, the rebels captured al-`Awabi. By July, the situation had gotten so dire that the British government sent a small garrison to Natrah to aid the sultan of Muscat, to no avail. In August, the rebels captured Samail. Also in August, the rebels launched an offensive towards the coastal side of al-Jabal al-Akhda, and Nakhl was besieged on the 4th. Nakhl ultimately fell at the beginning of April 1914, after the desertion of several of the imam's reinforcement contingents. In April 1914 British cruisers bombarded Barkah and Qaryat to dislodge rebels from those settlements.

In January 1915 the rebels began a long-anticipated attack on Muscat city. On the 7th the Imam had gathered with 400 men at Bidbid. Al-Watayyah was raided on the 8th, and on the 9th firing was heard in the nearby hills. The rebels advanced to the village of Bawshar and gathered at the village of al-Khuwayr. The two forces merged and advanced to al-Watayyah by the 10th. They were opposed by 750 British Indian Army troops, consisting of detachments of the 102nd Prince of Wales's Own Grenadiers (led by Colonel S. M. Edwardes and stationed at Bayt al-Falaj) and the 95th Russell's Infantry (commanded by Colonel F. F. Major and stationed at Ruwi village). A small detachment of Arab retainers was to protect Dar Sayt, but actually fled when fighting began.

On 11 January, the British Indian Army launched a large-scale counterattack, and the 750 troops succeeded at driving back around 3,000 rebels troops, causing 350 casualties with the rebel chief Isa bin Salih being wounded and his brother killed. By April 1915, German agents had arrived in the Ibāḍī imamate. The general perception of the rebels at that time was that Germans had more or less emerged victorious in the war in Europe, that Wilhelm II and his followers had converted to Islam, and that it was prudent to continue fighting the British and the sultan until they would be driven out of Arabia. Thus, they rejected all attempts by Britain to broker a peace settlement, which the British government desired due to a need for British troops elsewhere. In July the forts of Rushtaq and Hazam surrendered to the Rebels. However, the Sultan also recaptured some settlements in late July, such as the port of Daghmar and headquarters of Hayl al-Gha.

In June 1916, the Imam's forces attacked Bahi and al-Rustaq. While the former assault succeeded, the latter assault failed and the rebels opted to besiege it instead. al-Rushtaq finally fell in August 1917. Stalemate ensued for the following years. The final battle took place in April 1920 in al-Hazm, where a rebel assault was once again repelled. The rebels sued for peace in September 1920, ending the war.
