= William Montgomerie Thomson =

British Army officer

Lieutenant-General Sir William Montgomerie Thomson KCMG CB MC
- Portrait by Walter Stoneman, 1919
- Born: 2 December 1877
- Died: 23 July 1963 (aged 85)
- Military career
- Allegiance: United Kingdom
- Branch: British Army
- Service years: 1897–1934
- Rank: Lieutenant-General
- Commands: Seaforth Highlanders

Lieutenant-General Sir William Montgomerie Thomson KCMG CB MC (2 December 1877 – 23 July 1963) was a senior British Army officer who became military governor of Baku in 1918.

== Military career ==
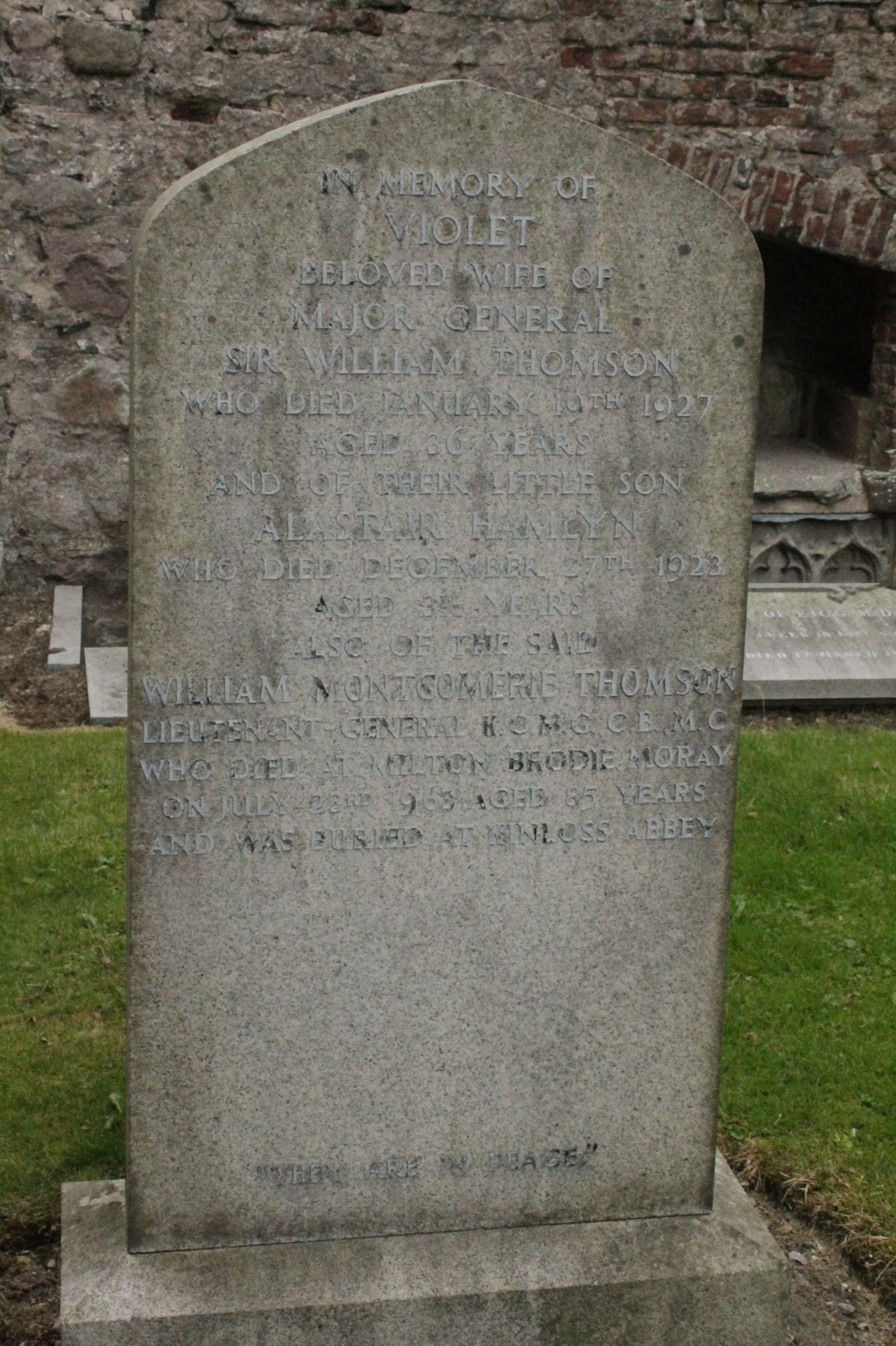
Memorial to Lt Gen William Montgomerie Thomson, St Machar's Cathedral

Born on 2 December 1877, William Thomson was the fourth son of Captain William Thomson of the 78th Highlanders and Alice Broughton. His older brother was Henry Broughton Thomson; Gwyneth Bebb married another brother, Thomas Weldon Thomson. He was educated at Bedford School.

In 1897 he joined the Seaforth Highlanders. He served in Sudan in 1898. During the First World War he commanded the 1st Seaforth Highlanders in France and Mesopotamia between 1915 and 1916, 35th Indian Brigade between 1916 and 1917, and 14th Indian Division between 1917 and 1918. Between September 1918 and May 1919 he commanded the North Persia Force and then British forces in the South Caucasus.

On 16 November 1918, in Bandar-e Anzali, Thomson met with Nasib Yusifbeyli, Musa bey Rafiyev and Ahmet Ağaoğlu, representatives of Musavat, the governing party of the Azerbaijan Democratic Republic (ADR). He outlined his goals as (i) ensuring the evacuation of military units of the Ottoman Army and the ADR from Baku, (ii) preventing Armenian troops from entering Baku, (iii) creating a British administration of local militia, (iv) facilitating the supply of oil from the Baku oilfields for the British, and (v) securing the eastern terminus of the Transcaucasus Railway. He denied that the British would interfere in internal affairs: "The principle of self-determination of peoples decided at the Paris Peace Conference from which Azerbaijan will not be excluded".

Thomson arrived in Baku the next day with about 2,000 soldiers of the British Indian Army and a detachment of Russian troops commanded by Nikolai Baratov. This was greeted with enthusiasm by the Russians of Baku. One of Thomson's first actions was to order the removal of the flag of the ADR. He also spoke in praise of Russia, declaring "The Allies cannot return home without restoring order in Russia and placing her in a position to again take her proper place among the nations of the world."

Thomson went on to become commander of the 154th Infantry Brigade in April 1920, was promoted to major general on 3 January 1923, General Officer Commanding the Presidency and Assam District in November 1924 and General Officer Commanding the 51st (Highland) Division in June 1925.

Thomson, promoted in June 1931 to lieutenant general, retired from the army in February 1934. He was given the colonelcy of the Seaforth Highlanders in 1939, holding the position until 1947.

He died on 23 July 1963. He is buried in Kinloss Abbey but is also memorialised on a family stone within the eastern enclosure at St Machar's Cathedral.

Military offices
Preceded by Archibald Ritchie	GOC 51st (Highland) Division; 1927–1931	Succeeded by Sir James Burnett
Honorary titles
Preceded by Sir Archibald Ritchie	Colonel of the Seaforth Highlanders; 1939–1947	Succeeded by Sir John Laurie
