= 16th Rajputs (The Lucknow Regiment) =

- Active: 1857-1922
- Country: Indian Empire
- Branch: Army
- Type: Infantry
- Part of: Bengal Army (to 1895); Bengal Command
- Uniform: Red; faced white
- Engagements: Indian Mutiny; First Anglo-Sikh War; Duffla Hill Expedition; Second Afghan War; Third Anglo-Burmese War; Siege of Malakand; Campaign against the Bunerwals; World War I

The 16th Rajputs (The Lucknow Regiment) was an infantry regiment of the Bengal Army and later of the united British Indian Army. It can trace its origins to 1857, during the Indian Mutiny when it was formed from men of the 13th, 48th and 71st Bengal Native Infantry regiments that remained loyal to the British. Named The Lucknow Regiment they were responsible for guarding the Bailey Gate in the Lucknow Residency. Over the years they were known by a number of different titles the 16th Bengal Native Infantry in 1861, the 16th (The Lucknow) Bengal Native Infantry 1864, the 16th (The Lucknow) Bengal Infantry 1885, the 16th (The Lucknow) Rajput Bengal Infantry 1897, the 16th Rajput Infantry (The Lucknow Regiment) 1901 and finally after the Kitchener reforms of the Indian Army the 16th Rajputs (The Lucknow Regiment).

During this time the regiment took part in the Duffla Hill Expedition, the Second Afghan War, the Third Anglo-Burmese War, the Siege of Malakand and the Campaign against the Bunerwals. During World War I they served in the Mesopotamia Campaign with the Jubbulpore Brigade 5th (Mhow) Division.

After World War I the Indian government reformed the Indian Army again moving from single battalion regiments to multi battalion regiments. The 6th Rajputs (The Lucknow Regiment) now became the 10th Training Battalion, 7th Rajput Regiment. After Independence this was one of the regiments allocated to the new Indian Army.
