= Archibald Ritchie (British Army officer) =

British Army officer (1869–1955)

Major-General Sir Archibald Ritchie KBE CB CMG
- Born: 14 May 1869
- Died: 9 July 1955 (aged 86)
- Military career
- Allegiance: United Kingdom
- Branch: British Army
- Rank: Major-General
- Commands: 26th Brigade; 11th (Northern) Division; 16th (Irish) Division; 51st (Highland) Division
- Conflicts: Second Boer War; First World War
- Awards: Knight Commander of the Order of the British Empire, Companion of the Order of the Bath, Companion of the Order of St Michael and St George, Mentioned in dispatches

Major-General Sir Archibald Buchanan Ritchie KBE CB CMG (14 May 1869 – 9 July 1955) was a British Army officer, who commanded the 11th (Northern) Division and 16th (Irish) Division during the First World War.

== Early military career ==
Ritchie was born in May 1869, the son of John Ritchie, an artillery officer who would later rise to the rank of major general. He was educated at the United Services College and the Royal Military College at Sandhurst, before being commissioned as a subaltern, with the rank of second lieutenant, into the Seaforth Highlanders in September 1889. He saw service in the Nile Campaign of 1898, and was promoted to captain on 2 May 1898.

When the Second Boer War broke out in late 1899, Ritchie was temporarily appointed Adjutant of the newly established 4th (Militia) Battalion of the West Yorkshire Regiment, which was sent to South Africa. He was twice mentioned in despatches for his service and returned to the United Kingdom in March 1902.

He was promoted to major in June 1905.

== First World War ==
On the outbreak of the First World War, Ritchie was a Lieutenant-Colonel commanding the 1st Battalion Seaforth Highlanders, based in India. The battalion was mobilised as part of the 7th (Meerut) Division in Indian Expeditionary Force A, and sent to France, where it arrived in October 1914, and first saw action on 7 November.

He remained with the battalion during the Battle of Neuve Chapelle in March 1915, where his commander praised him as "most reliable". In May he was promoted to the temporary rank of brigadier general and given command of the 9th (Scottish) Division's 26th Infantry Brigade.

He led the brigade at the Battle of Loos (1915) and the Battle of the Somme (1916) before being promoted to command the 11th (Northern) Division in December 1916, which carried with it the temporary rank of major general. He was wounded in May 1917, and, after recovering from his injuries, and after being promoted back to temporary major general in May 1918, returned to command the 16th (Irish) Division.

== Post-war and final years ==
Following the end of the war, Ritchie was confirmed in the rank of major general in June 1919, and briefly commanded a division from August 1919 until January 1920.

He commanded the 51st (Highland) Division in the Territorial Army (TA) from June 1923, when he took over from Major General Ewen Sinclair-MacLagan, before retiring from the army in May 1928. In retirement, he was the ceremonial colonel of the Seaforth Highlanders from 1931–39.

Ritchie was appointed a Knight Commander of the Order of the British Empire (KBE) in the 1927 Birthday Honours.

== Sources ==
- Willcocks, James (1920). With the Indians in France. Constable.

Military offices
Preceded by Charles Woollcombe	GOC 11th (Northern) Division; 1916−1917	Succeeded by Henry Davies
Preceded by Sir Charles Hull	GOC 16th (Irish) Division; 1918–1919	Succeeded by Post disbanded
Preceded by Ewen Sinclair-Maclagan	GOC 51st (Highland) Division; 1923–1927	Succeeded by William Thomson
Honorary titles
Preceded by Sir Colin Mackenzie	Colonel of the Seaforth Highlanders; 1931–1939	Succeeded by William Montgomerie Thomson
