= 37th Dogras =

37th Dogras now 7 Mech Inf (1 Dogra)
- Active: 1887-1992 ( now active as 7 Mech Inf (1Dogra)
- Country: Indian Empire
- Branch: Army
- Type: Infantry
- Part of: Bengal Army (to 1895); Bengal Command
- Uniform: Scarlet; faced yellow
- Engagements: Chitral Expedition; World War I

The 37th (Prince of Wales's Own) Dogras was an infantry regiment of the British Indian Army. The regiment could trace its origins to 1887, when it was raised as the 37th (Dogra) Bengal Infantry.

The regiment took part in the Chitral Expedition in 1895 and World War I. During World War I the regiment was in the 14th Indian Division and took part in the Second Battle of Kut and the Capture of Baghdad during the Mesopotamia Campaign.

After World War I, the Indian government reformed the army moving from single battalion infantry regiments to multi-battalion regiments. In 1922, the 37th Dogras became the 1st Battalion (Prince of Wales's Own), 17th Dogra Regiment. The regiment was allocated to the new Indian Army on independence.

== Predecessor names ==
- 37th (Dogra) Bengal Infantry - 1887
- 37th Dogra Infantry - 1901
- 37th Dogras - 1903

== Sources ==
- Barthorp, Michael; Burn, Jeffrey (1979). Indian infantry regiments 1860-1914. Osprey Publishing. ISBN 0-85045-307-0.
- Sumner, Ian (2001). The Indian Army 1914-1947. Osprey Publishing. ISBN 1-84176-196-6.
- F. J. Moberly (1997) [1923]. Official History of the War: Mesopotamia Campaign. Imperial War Museum. ISBN 1-870423-30-5.
