= North Persia Force =

- Active: 1918–1920
- Country: (United Kingdom) British Empire
- Allegiance: Allies
- Type: Infantry
- Role: Detachment
- Size: Brigade
- Engagements: Anzali Operation

Commanders
- Notable commanders: William Montgomery Thomson; Hugh Bateman-Champain

The North Persia Force (Norper force) was a British military force that operated in Northern Persia from 1918 to 1920. Following the British abandonment of Baku on the night of 14 September 1918, Major General Lionel Dunsterville evacuated the forces under his command, known as the Dunsterforce, in the dead of night, arriving in Bandar-e Anzali the following day. Two days later he was relieved of command, that position being taken by Major General W. M. Thomson.

== Composition ==
The force was a large brigade which consisted of:

- 1st Battalion, Royal Irish Fusiliers
- 1st Battalion, 42nd Deoli Regiment
- 122nd Rajputana Infantry
- 1st Battalion, 2nd Gurkha Rifles
- Guides Cavalry
- A Battery (The Chestnut Troop) Royal Horse Artillery
- No. 30 Squadron RAF
- 15th Light Armoured Motor Battery
- 31st Indian Pack Battery
- 48th Divisional Signal Company
- 19th Company 3rd Sappers and Miners
- Reinforcements sent from Mesopotamia:
  - 1st Battalion, Royal Berkshire Regiment
  - 2nd Battalion, York and Lancaster Regiment
  - 2 platoons of the 1st Battalion, 67th Punjabis were based at Tabriz

The force was commanded by Brigadier General Hugh Bateman-Champain who was based at Kasvin.

== General and cited references ==
- Moberly, F. J. (1987) [1929]. Operations in Persia 1914–1919. History of the Great War based on Official Documents by Direction of the Committee of Imperial Defence (Imperial War Museum facsimile of the confidential 1929 printing ed.). London: HMSO. ISBN 0-11-290453-X – via Qatar Digital Library.
