= 2nd King Edward VII's Own Gurkha Rifles (The Sirmoor Rifles) =

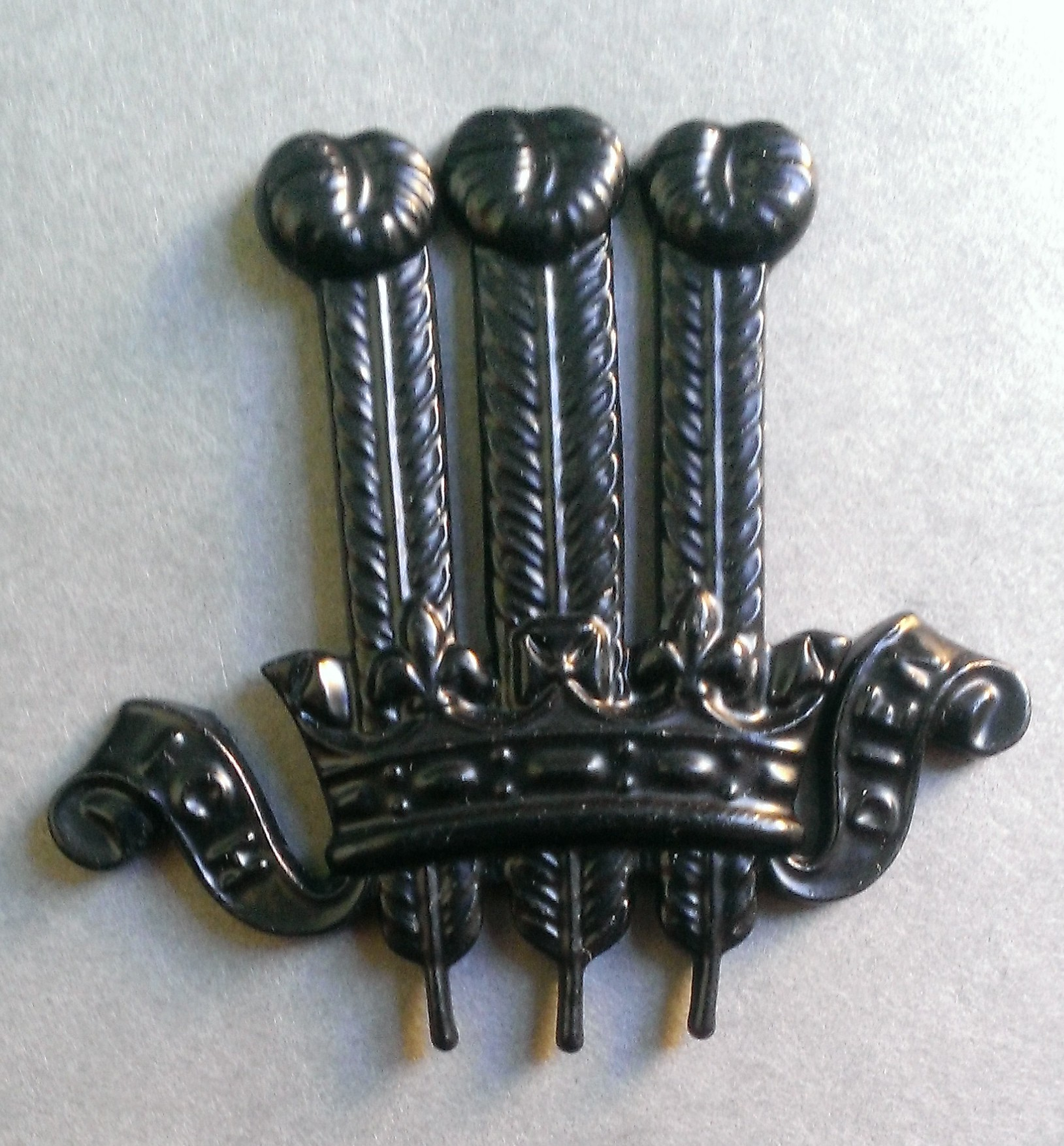
- Cap badge
- Active: 1815–1994
- Country: India; United Kingdom
- Type: Infantry
- Role: Light Infantry
- Garrison/HQ: British Hong Kong
- Nicknames: The Sirmoor Rifles, Second (2nd) GR
- Colors: Green; faced and piped red, 1888 scarlet
- March: Lützow's Wild Chase-Quick March

Commanders
- Colonel in Chief: Charles, Prince of Wales
- Notable commanders: Lieutenant-Colonel Begbie; Major General D Macintyre VC; Colonel H T Macpherson VC; Subadar-Major Santbir Gurung; Lieutenant-Colonel Frederick William Nicolay

Insignia
- Shoulder Flash
- Abbreviation: 2 GR

The 2nd King Edward VII's Own Gurkha Rifles (The Sirmoor Rifles) was a rifle regiment of the British Indian Army before being transferred to the British Army on India's independence in 1947. The 4th Battalion joined the Indian Army as the 5th Battalion, 8th Gorkha Rifles (Sirmoor Rifles), where it exists to this day. As part of the British Army, the regiment served in Malaya, Hong Kong and Brunei until 1994 when it was amalgamated with the other three British Army Gurkha infantry regiments to form the Royal Gurkha Rifles. It is the only Gurkha regiment which did not have a khukuri on its cap badge.

== History ==
=== Formation and early service ===
The regiment was first raised in 1815 as The Sirmoor Battalion. This was the first Gurkha unit in the service of the East India Company to see action, during the 3rd Mahratta War in 1817. The regiment, by now named the 8th (Sirmoor) Local Battalion, gained its first battle honour at Bhurtpore in 1825. During the First Sikh War, the regiment fought at Bhudaiwal and Sobraon, as well as the Battle of Aliwal. Personnel carried colours at the time, and the flagpole was broken by cannon fire. The colour itself was seized by the Sikhs but reclaimed by a small party of Gurkhas led by a Havildar who chopped their way into the densely packed enemy lines.

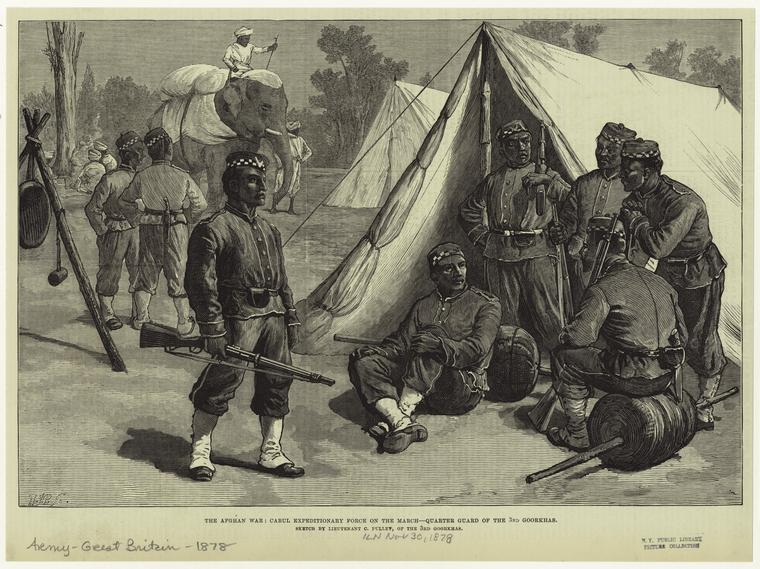
Kabul expeditionary force on the march: Quarter Guard of the 3 Gorkha Rifles. 30 November 1878.

During the Indian Mutiny, the Sirmoor Battalion was one of the Indian regiments that remained loyal to Britain. It was during this that the regiment took part in the defence of Hindu Rao's House, near Delhi. For their part in the action, the Sirmoor Battalion was presented with the Queen's Truncheon, which became a replacement for the colours that they relinquished when the regiment became a rifle regiment in 1858. (Note: Rifle regiments by tradition did not possess Colours.) With the decision to number the Gurkha regiments in 1861, the Sirmoor Rifles became the 2nd Gurkha Regiment. In 1876, the battalion acquired a royal patron in the then Prince of Wales, becoming the 2nd (Prince of Wales's Own) Gurkha Regiment (The Sirmoor Rifles).

=== First World War ===
During the First World War, the 2nd Gurkhas (by now named the 2nd King Edward's Own Gurkha Rifles), along with the other regiments of the Gurkha Brigade, served initially in Flanders. In 1915, the 2nd Battalion moved to Egypt, before returning to India in 1916. The 1st Battalion went to Persia and Mesopotamia in 1916, assisting in the fall of Baghdad. In 1919 it was assigned to the Norperforce in Iran.

=== Second World War ===
The Second World War saw the 2nd Gurkhas serving in many different theatres; the 1st Battalion was initially in Cyprus before moving to North Africa as part of 7th Indian Infantry Brigade, 4th Indian Division, where it fought at El Alamein. Following this it took part in the invasion of Italy, taking part in the battle for Monte Cassino. The 2nd Battalion meanwhile spent much of the war as prisoners of the Japanese after being captured in Malaya. The 3rd Battalion (raised during the war) took part in the Chindit operations in Burma in 1943.

=== Indian independence ===
In 1947, as part of India's independence, it was agreed that the Gurkha regiments would be split between the British and Indian armies—the British Army would take on four regiments (the 2nd, 6th, 7th and 10th), while the Indian Army would retain the rest.

While the 2nd Gurkhas became one of the four Gurkha regiments to transfer to the British Army, the regiment's 4th Battalion was transferred to the Indian Army as 5th Battalion, 8th Gurkha Rifles (Sirmoor Rifles) where it exists to this day. The first Indian commanding officer of this battalion, Lieutenant Colonel (later Brigadier) Nisi Kanta Chatterji, requested Army Headquarters, to let the battalion keep the title 'Sirmoor Rifles', which was accepted. This battalion saw action in the 1965 Indo-Pakistan War (as part of the 3rd (Independent) Armoured Brigade, 28 and 191 Infantry Brigades) where it stopped the advance of the Pakistani armour to Akhnur in the Battle of the Fatwal Ridge. In the 1971 war against Pakistan, the battalion now as part of the 68th Mountain Brigade, the corps reserves, once again saw fierce action in the defence of Chamb-Akhnur. It launched five successful counterattacks and recaptured the bridge over the Tawi river.

It also fought in the Indian North east against the Naga insurgents and in the Doda district of Jammu and Kashmir. Here it distinguished itself by killing the Supreme Commander of the Hizbul Mujahideen, the leading Kashmiri insurgent group. It was awarded the Northern Army Commanders Citation in 1998. It was deployed in Sierra Leone as part of UNAMSIL and distinguished itself in Operation Khukri in which the Revolutionary United Front rebels were decisively defeated.

=== Post Indian independence ===
Following this, the 2nd Gurkhas spent several years in the Far East, initially during the Malayan Emergency from 1948 to 1960. Following this, the regiment's two battalions alternated between Malaya, Borneo, Brunei and Hong Kong, before receiving a regimental depot at Church Crookham in Hampshire. In 1992, while serving in Hong Kong, the 1st and 2nd Battalions amalgamated to form a single 1st Battalion. This was followed in 1994 by the regiment being amalgamated with the 6th Queen Elizabeth's Own Gurkha Rifles to form the 1st Battalion, Royal Gurkha Rifles.

== Battle honours ==
The regiment was awarded the following battle honours:

- Bhurtpore, Aliwal, Sobraon, Delhi 1857, Kabul 1879, Kandahar 1880, Afghanistan 1878–80, Chin-Lushai Expedition 1889-90, Tirah, Punjab Frontier
- First World War: La Bassée 1914, Festubert 1914 '15, Givenchy 1914, Neuve Chapelle, Aubers, Loos, France and Flanders 1914–15, Egypt 1915, Tigris 1916, Kut al Amara 1917, Baghdad, Mesopotamia 1916–18, Persia 1918, Baluchistan 1918
- Afghanistan 1919
- The Second World War: El Alamein, Mareth, Akarit, Djebel el Meida, Enfidaville, Tunis, North Africa 1942–43, Cassino I, Monastery Hill, Pian di Maggio, Gothic Line, Coriano, Poggio San Giovanni, Monte Reggiano, Italy 1944–45, Greece 1944–45, North Malaya, Jitra, Central Malaya, Kampar, Slim River, Johore, Singapore Island, Malaya 1941–42, North Arakan, Irrawaddy, Magwe, Sittang 1945, Point 1433, Arakan Beaches, Myebon, Tanbingon, Tamandu, Chindits 1943, Burma 1943–45.

== Victoria Crosses ==
- Major Donald MacIntyre (Bengal Staff Corps attached to the regiment) – 4 January 1872, Lalgnoora, India.
- Subedar Lalbahadur Thapa – 6 April 1943, Tunisia.
- Rifleman Bhanbhagta Gurung – 5 March 1945, Burma.

== Colonels-in-Chief ==
- 1904–1910: King Edward VII
- 1910–1936: King George V
- 1977–1994: Charles, Prince of Wales

== Regimental Colonels ==
Colonels of the Regiment were:

- 1946–1956: Lt-Gen. Sir Francis Ivan Simms Tuker, KCIE, CB, DSO, OBE, FRGS, FRSA
- 1956–1969: Maj-Gen. Lewis Henry Owain Pugh, CB, CBE, DSO
- 1969–1976: Brig. Simon Patrick Martin Kent, CBE
- 1976–1986: F.M. Edwin Noel Westby Bramall, The Baron Bramall, KG, GCB, OBE, MC, KStJ
- 1986–1994: F.M. Sir John Lyon Chapple, KCB, CBE
- 1994: Regiment amalgamated with 6th Queen Elizabeth's Own Gurkha Rifles, 7th Duke of Edinburgh's Own Gurkha Rifles and 10th Princess Mary's Own Gurkha Rifles to form The Royal Gurkha Rifles

== Uniforms ==
After a brief period of wearing their own indigenous clothing, the Sirmoor battalion adopted green jackets with red facings. These were worn with loose fitting blue trousers and a bonnet like headdress. By 1828 black facings, black leather equipment, white trousers and sandals had been issued. A variety of changes followed but the round Kilmarnock cap with red and black dicing had appeared by 1848.

While the Kilmarnock was to become common to all Gurkha regiments, the red trim was to remain a distinctive feature of the 2nd Gurkha Rifles. In 1858 links forged during the Siege of Delhi led to the authorization of the Gurkha regiment to adopt the red piping and facings of the British 60th Rifles. Formally recognized as a rifle regiment since 1850 the 2nd Gurkha Regiment underwent various changes of title as recorded above. Throughout it wore the standard Gurkha parade and cold weather uniform of rifle green with leggings and then puttees, silver insignia and black metal buttons. A red toorie (bobble) on the cap was to remain a distinction of the 2nd Gurkha Rifles. In 1883 khaki (initially blue/grey) hot weather dress was adopted. The broad brimmed hat was worn with khaki drill service dress from 1902 and was retained as normal uniform between the two world wars. After World War I the historic rifle green was limited to a few limited dress orders such as officers' mess uniforms and full dress for mess orderlies. During World War II red and black patches were worn on the jungle slouch hats.

== See also ==
- List of Brigade of Gurkhas recipients of the Victoria Cross
