= 42nd Deoli Regiment =

- Active: 1857–1922
- Country: Indian Empire
- Branch: Army
- Type: Infantry
- Part of: Bengal Army (to 1895). Bengal Command (1895 –1908).
- Nickname: Meena Battalion (original title)
- Colors: Dark green coats and tunics faced red. Scarlet trousers.

The 42nd Deoli Regiment was an infantry regiment of the British Indian Army. The regiment traced their origins to 1857, when the Meena Battalion was raised during the Indian Mutiny. This battalion was the nucleus for the infantry of the Deoli Irregular Force which in May 1861, numbered eight companies. A cavalry detachment was added to the regiment by 1865 and continued to form part of it until at least 1886. After this date the 42nd became an exclusively infantry regiment.

From its foundation the regiment was recruited mainly from various Meena sub-sects. In the Indian Army List of January 1919 the recruitment basis was described broadly as "four companies of Rajputana Hindus and Musalmans".

The regiment later served in the Second Afghan War and World War I in the 5th (Mhow) Division. During World War I a second battalion was raised in 1917. Both battalions remained in India for internal security duties during the war but a single company of Meenas was posted to Mesopotamia. After World War I the Indian infantry was reorganized, moving from single battalion regiments to multi-battalion regiments. Nine regiments were disbanded as part of this restructuring. The 42nd Deoli Regiment was one of the regiments surplus to the new structure and it was disbanded on 10 December 1921.
