= Battle of Mount Hamrin =

Battle in the Mesopotamian Campaign during the First World War

Battle Of Mount Hamrin
- Part of the Mesopotamian campaign of World War I
| Date | 25 March 1917 |
| Location | Near Mount Hamrin and the Diyala River, Baghdad Vilayet, Ottoman Iraq |
| Result | Ottoman victory |

Belligerents
| British Empire: India; United Kingdom | Ottoman Empire |

Commanders and leaders
| Major General Henry D'Urban Keary | Ali İshan |

Units involved
| 8th (Jullundur) and 9th (Sirhind) Brigades | XIII Corps of the Ottoman 6th Army |

Strength
| 8,000 men | 4,500 men 20 guns |

Casualties and losses
| 1,200 men | Unknown, less than British Empire |

The Battle of Mount Hamrin was an unsuccessful British effort to cut off part of the Ottoman Sixth Army after the capture of Baghdad during the Mesopotamia campaign during the First World War.

== Background ==
The British Empire captured Baghdad from the Ottoman Empire on 11 March 1917. British General Frederick Stanley Maude felt that the presence of 10,000 Ottoman troops north of the city, led by Khalil Pasha, and the presence of another 15,000 Ottomans under Ali Ihsan Bey posed a considerable threat to the British position in the region. Intelligence obtained by the British indicated that the Ottomans were preparing a new army group to retake Mesopotamia. General Maude launched the Samarrah Offensive to push the Ottomans away from Baghdad. Maude dispatched four columns under the command of Major General H. D'Urban Keary. The immediate objective for the force was the village of Baquba. After an initial reverse, the British secured the village from the Ottomans on 17 March 1917. During their offensive, the British believed there was a simultaneous offensive being undertaken by Russian forces under Lieutenant General Nikolai Nikolaevich Baratov to attack Turkish General Ishan. The British were unaware this Russian force had been rendered ineffective by desertion and lack of supply caused by the Russian Revolution. Ali Ishan commanded the Corps facing the Russians on the Diyala river. Ishan's 2nd Division held the ground against the Russians while his 6th Division crossed back into Mesopotamia from Persia. Maude could not allow this maneuverer to occur unhampered, and decided to force Ishan to fight causing two Ottoman rearguard actions, one being the battle of Mount Hamrin.

== Prelude ==
=== Ottoman Preparations ===
Keary's advance up the Diyala was delayed by Ottoman rearguard units, as such Ali Ishan used this delay to heavily fortify his position at Mount Hamrin, a long and relatively low ridge stretching from near the river to just north of Baiji. Before the battle the Ottomans dug three lines of trenches overlooking two canals at the foot of the mountain.

=== British Plan of Attack ===
The British force, two Indian Raj Divisions, referred to as the "Khanaqin column", contained the 8th and 9th Indian Brigades. Keary decided to use his 8th Indian Brigade to directly assault the Ottoman position while the 9th Brigade flanked around to the east. This strategy depended on surprise, an element which was lost when the Ottoman Forces detected British forces building a bridge. British air reconnaissance detected the Ottomans moving forces to reinforce their east flank but Keary decided to proceed regardless.

The battle opened shortly after dawn on 25 March 1917. The 9th Indian Brigade did not flank far enough east and attacked the Ottoman position where it had been reinforced instead of circling around the Ottoman trenches. The 9th brigade suffered significant losses and was only able to withdraw once the 8th Brigade launched an assault on the center of the Ottoman trenches. At the end of the day, Keary broke off the engagement to prevent further casualties.

== Aftermath ==
Ishan used this Ottoman victory to withdraw across the Diyala river in an effort to link with the Sixth army. Keary continued towards the Russians, believing that the Russian force was combat effective. Contact between the forces was made on April First. Keary learned the Russians were not an effective force. As no Ottoman threat existed east of the Diyala or in Persia, Keary rejoined the main British Army under Maude. Although the British lost the battle of Mount Hamrin, it marked the last time the Ottomans attempted to invade Persia to threaten British India.
