= 95th Russell's Infantry =

- Active: 1813–1922
- Country: British Indian Empire
- Branch: Army
- Type: Infantry
- Part of: Nizam's Contingent; Hyderabad Contingent; Madras Command
- Colors: Red; faced dark green
- Engagements: Third Anglo-Maratha War; Second Burmese War; World War I

The 95th Russell's Infantry were an infantry regiment of the British Indian Army. They could trace their origins to 1813, when they were raised as the 2nd Battalion of the Russell Brigade for the Princely state of Hyderabad. Until 1853, the regiment was part of the Nizam of Hydrabad's Army, then after signing of a treaty with the then Governor-General of India, The Nizam's Contingent was renamed as the Hyderabad Contingent and became part of the regular Indian Army.

In 1914 the regiment comprised three companies of Rajputs, three companies of Hindustani Muslims, and one company of Ahirs and was stationed in Bombay. The regiment stayed in India for the first three years of World War One (1914-1918), transferring to Mesopotamia in the autumn of 1917. In December 1918 the unit transferred to Salonika and from there moved to Turkey where it participated in the post-war occupation.

The regiment fought in the Battle of Mahidpur during the Third Anglo-Maratha War. They then participated in the Siege of Nowah and the later Capture of Nowah. They next participated in the annexation of Burma during the Second Burmese War.

After the First World War the Indian government reformed its army, moving from single battalion regiments to multi-battalion regiments. In 1922, the 95th Russell's Infantry became the 10th (Training) Battalion, 19th Hyderabad Regiment. This regiment was allocated to the Indian Army after independence.

== Predecessor names ==
- 2nd Battalion of the Russell Brigade - 1813
- 2nd Regiment of Infantry, Nizam's Army - 1826
- 2nd Infantry, Hyderabad Contingent - 1854
- 95th Russell's Infantry - 1903
