= 5th (Mhow) Division =

- Active: 1903–1922
- Country: British India
- Allegiance: British Crown
- Branch: British Indian Army
- Type: Infantry
- Role: Internal Security
- Size: Division
- Part of: Southern Army
- Garrison/HQ: Mhow

The 5th (Mhow) Division was a regular division of the British Indian Army and part of the Southern Army which was formed in 1903 after Lord Kitchener was appointed Commander-in-Chief, India between 1902 and 1909. He instituted large-scale reforms, including merging the three armies of the Presidencies into a unified force and forming higher level formations, eight army divisions, and brigading Indian and British units. Following Kitchener's reforms, the British Indian Army was "the force recruited locally and permanently based in India, together with its expatriate British officers."

The Division remained in India on internal security duties during World War I, but some of its units were transferred to serve with other formations. The cavalry units formed the 5th (Mhow) Cavalry Brigade in the 1st Indian Cavalry Division and served in France and Egypt.

== Formation 1914 ==
Commanding General Major General Richard Lloyd Payne

=== Nasirabad Brigade ===
Commanding General Major General Davison

- 27th Light Cavalry
- 1st Btn Royal Irish Regiment
- 42nd Deoli Regiment
- 43rd Erinpura Regiment
- 44th Merwara Infantry
- 90th Punjabis
- XIII Brigade, Royal Horse Artillery
- XI Brigade, Royal Field Artillery
- XIX Brigade, Royal Field Artillery

=== Jubbulpore Brigade ===
Commanding General, Major General Fanshawe

- 2nd Lancers (Gardner's Horse)
- 32nd Lancers
- 2nd Btn Cheshire Regiment
- 1st Btn York and Lancaster Regiment
- 2nd Btn East Yorkshire Regiment
- 16th Rajputs (The Lucknow Regiment)
- 63rd Palamcottah Light Infantry
- 97th Deccan Infantry
- 98th Infantry
- Royal Garrison Artillery, 71 and 90 Companies

=== Jhansi Brigade ===
Commanding General, Major General Townshend

- 8th Lancers
- 38th Central Indian Horse
- 2nd Btn Royal Berkshire Regiment
- 10th Jats
- 99th Deccan Infantry
- 107th Pioneers
- 116th Mahrattas
- Royal Garrison Artillery, 60 Company

=== Unbrigaded Units ===
- 14th King's Hussars
- 2nd Btn Hampshire Regiment
- 96th Berar Infantry
- 125th Napier's Rifles
- VI Brigade RFA
- XX Brigade RFA

== See also ==
- List of Indian divisions in World War I

== Bibliography ==
- Haythornthwaite, Philip J. (1996). The World War One Source Book. London: Arms and Armour Press. ISBN 1-85409-351-7.
- Moberly, Frederick James (1927) [1923]. The Campaign in Mesopotamia 1914–1918. History of the Great War Based on Official Documents. Vol. I. London: HMSO. OCLC 772784341.
- Perry, F.W. (1993). Order of Battle of Divisions Part 5B. Indian Army Divisions. Newport: Ray Westlake Military Books. ISBN 1-871167-23-X.
