= Second Battle of Kut =

1917 WWI battle in Ottoman Iraq

- Part of the Mesopotamian campaign of World War I
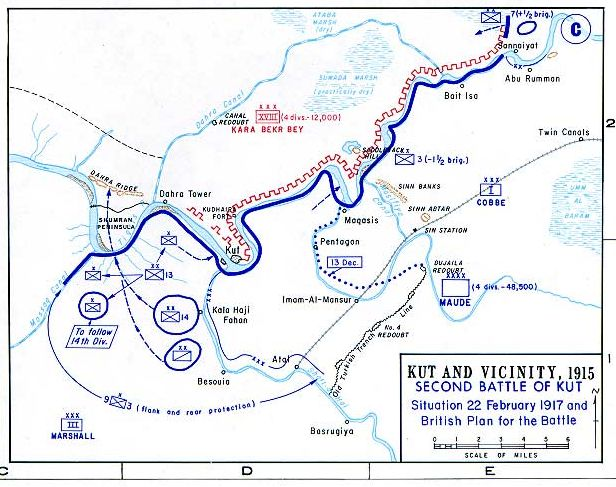
- Situation at Kut on 22 February 1917.
Date	23 February 1917
Location	Kut, Ottoman Iraq 32.505556°N 45.824722°E
Result	British Empire victory

Belligerents
British Empire: India; United Kingdom	Ottoman Empire

Commanders and leaders
(United Kingdom of Great Britain and Ireland) Frederick Maude	(Ottoman Empire) Kâzım Karabekir Bey

Strength
50,000	17,000
- Location within Iraq

The Second Battle of Kut was fought on 23 February 1917, between British and Ottoman forces at Kut, in Ottoman Iraq.

The battle was part of the British advance to Baghdad begun in December 1916 by a 50,000-man British force (mainly from British India) organised in two army corps.

The British, led by Frederick Stanley Maude, recaptured the city, but the Ottoman garrison there did not get trapped inside (as had happened to Townshend's troops in the previous year when the Ottomans had besieged Kut in the siege of Kut): the Ottoman commander, Kâzım Karabekir Bey, managed a good-order retreat from the town of his remaining soldiers (about 2,500), pursued by a British fluvial flotilla along the Tigris River.

The British advance wore off on 27 February at Aziziyeh, some 100 kilometers (62 mi) beyond Kut. After three days' worth of supplies had been accumulated, Maude continued his march toward Baghdad.

== Action of the Western Bank of the Shatt-al-Hai ==
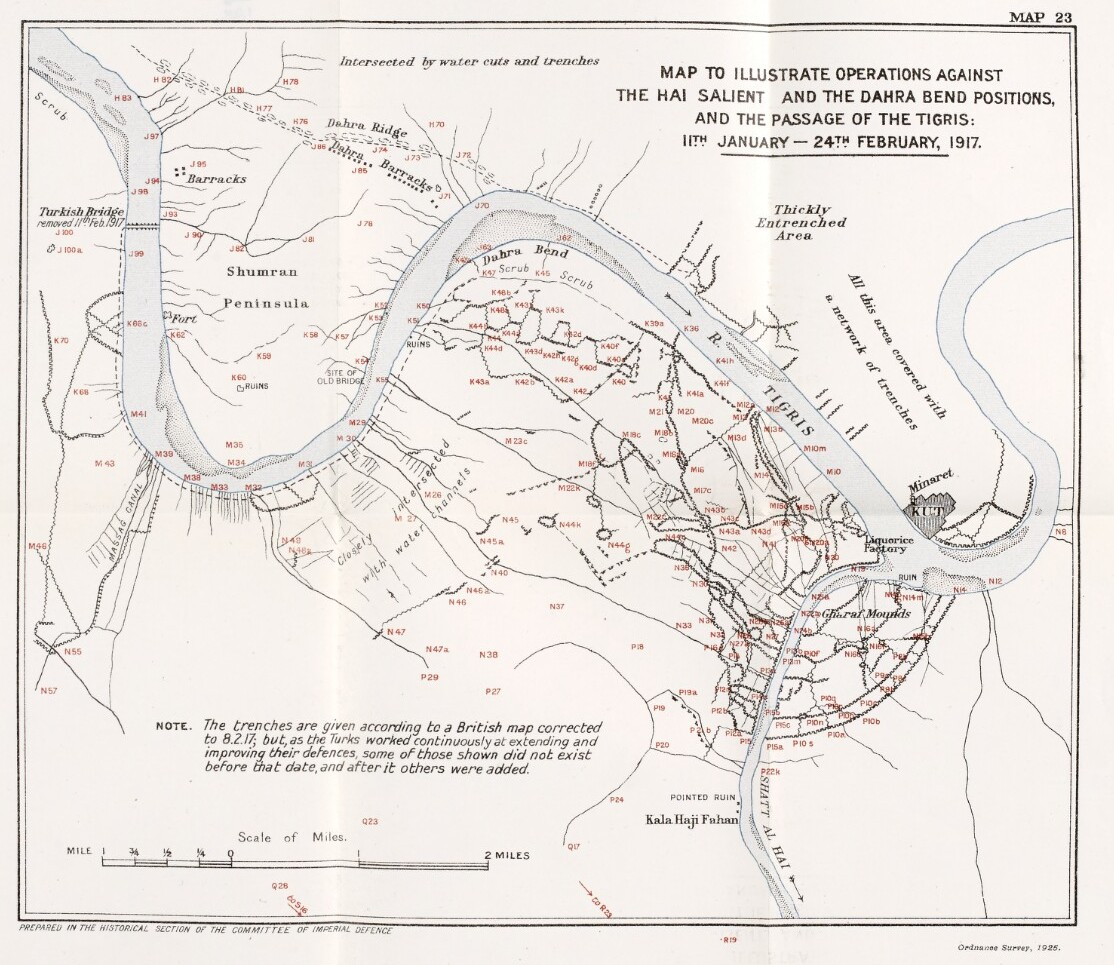
Map of Ottoman defences on the Hai Salient.

The primary objective on the western side of the Shatt al Hai was a liquorice factory (nicknamed the "Wool Press Village" by its defenders) on the opposite side of the Tigris from Kut. The factory, and the entrenchments surrounding it, were the last remaining Ottoman positions on the Hai salient; If it were to be captured, it would allow British and Indian forces to cross the Tigris and advance up into the Shumran bend and across to capture Kut.

New British trenches were made by 21 January only 300 yards (270 m) from the enemy trenches. They consisted of four rows of trenches named "Baron's Trench", "Queen's Trench", "King's Trench", and "Emperor's Trench". The trenches were occupied by the 39th Brigade. An attack was planned for 22 January, but was postponed by three days due to heavy rains.

On 25 January 1917, the Ottoman lines north of Kala Haji were attacked (marked P15, P12a, P12b on map of defences above). At 9:40 am, the 9th Worcestershires and the 7th North Staffords attacked with the support of a heavy artillery bombardment that allowed the two battalions to get within 50 yards (46 m) of the Ottoman entrenchments. They seized the objective despite the many casualties they suffered.

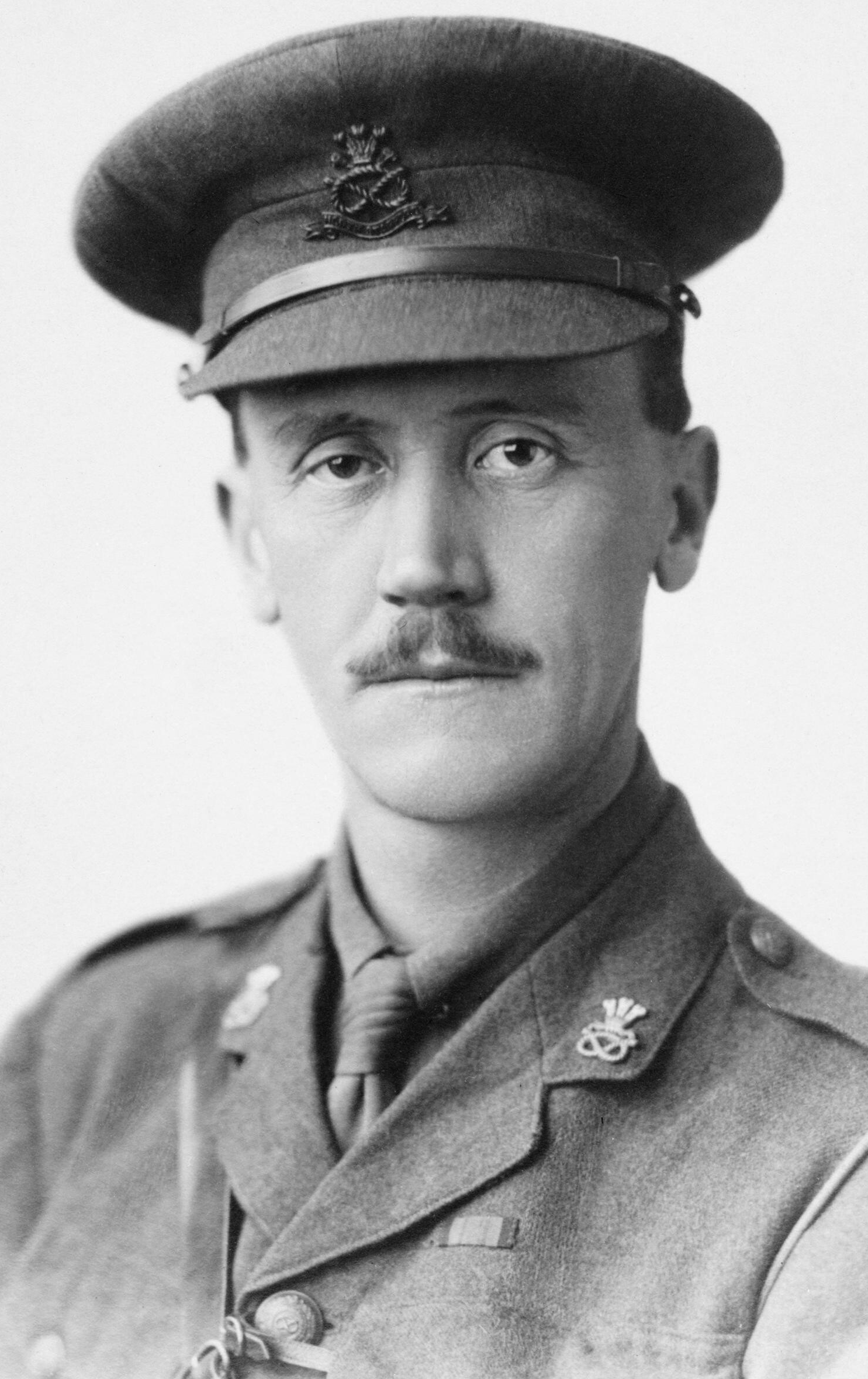
Lieutenant Colonel Henderson (VC)

A Turkish counterattack, however, drove the British battalions away with bombs and trench mortars. To salvage the situation, Lieutenant Colonel Henderson (who was commissioned into the North Staffords) led the 9th Royal Warwickshires out of the brigade reserve to re-attack the positions, even though he was already wounded. He led the Warwicks across 500 yards (460 m) of open ground whilst the first wave of attackers were retreating and was wounded again but this didn't deter him from commanding a bayonet charge that re-captured the lost objectives. While organising a defence of the objective, Henderson was wounded two more times and was rescued by his adjutant, Lieutenant Phillips, before dying. Both received the Victoria Cross. Phillips also attempted to reestablish communications via rolling out the cable of a field telephone over open ground whilst under fire. Corporal Scott also contributed to rescuing Henderson and was awarded the Distinguished Conduct Medal. Future Field Marshal Viscount Slim – a second lieutenant in early 1917 – participated in this attack, and remembered Phillip's action as a "superb example of leadership." However, as the Ottoman counter-attacks continued, the British were forced back to their starting positions by the end of the day. The 9th Royal Warwickshire Regiment sustained 192 killed, wounded and missing. The 39th Brigade were relieved by the 36th Brigade of the 14th Indian Division by 4:15am on 26 January.

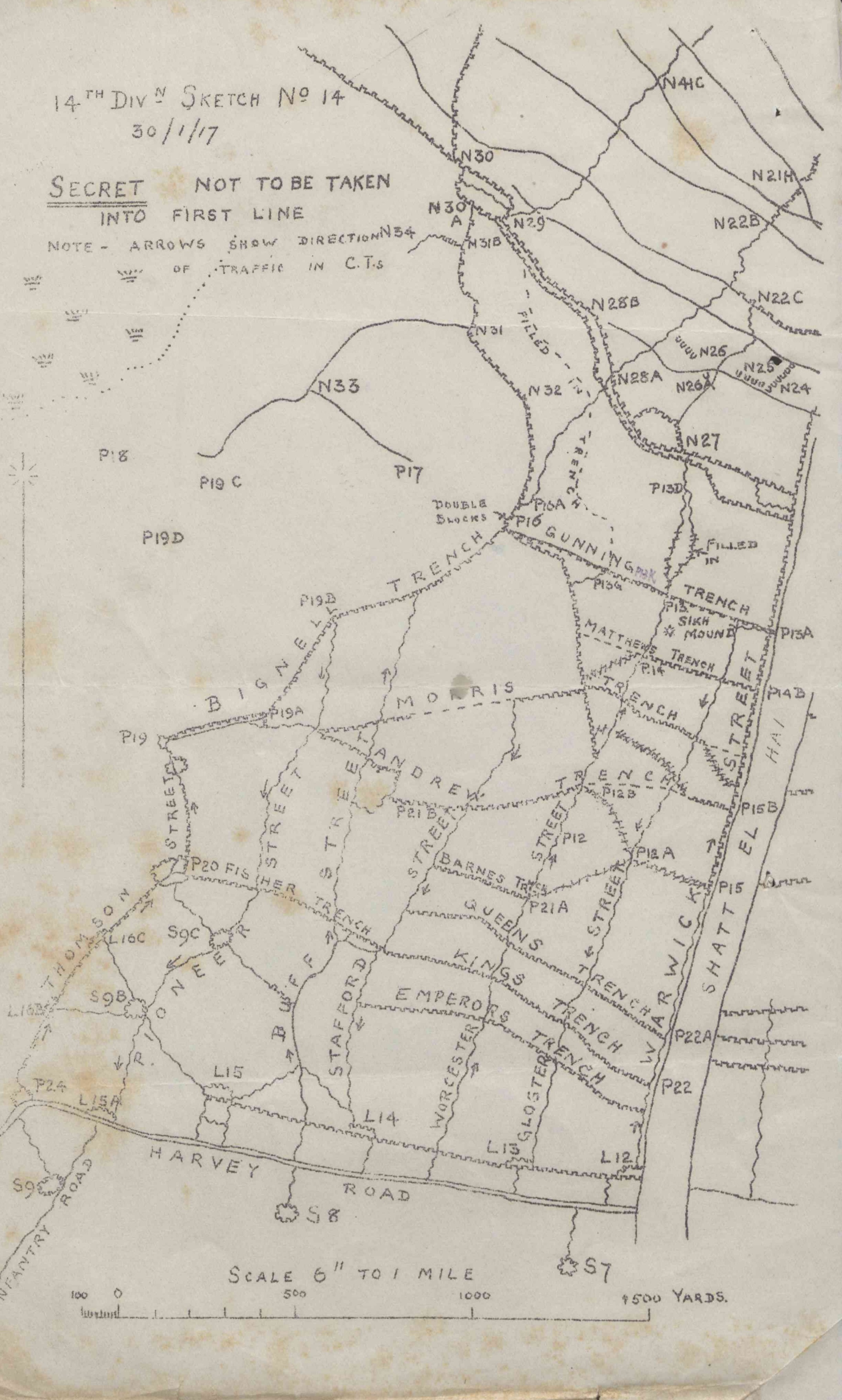
Detailed sketch of British and Ottoman trenches on the western bank of the River Hai. Map accurate 30 January 1917.

At 10:40am, the 1/4 Hampshires and 82nd Punjabis of the 36th attacked the Turkish Positions following a preliminary bombardment. There were initial heavy casualties crossing the no-man's-land (the 82nd Punjabis sustained 229 killed, wounded and missing mostly from Ottoman artillery whilst crossing the open ground) but the attack was successful in capturing and securing the narrow Ottoman trenches, which were found to be littered with corpses, for the whole day despite continuous Turkish artillery fire. In the night, the whole of the 82nd were employed in digging communication trenches connecting the captured Ottoman trenches to the British lines. Meanwhile, the Hampshires held the captured frontline. The Punjabis would rest starting on 28 January at camp behind friendly lines.

By the morning of the 28th, A and C companies as well as half of B company of the 1/4 Hampshire's occupied the 4th line of enemy trenches after scouting the night before found it deserted. At 11:30, there was a minor bombing counter-attack by the Ottomans, but it was driven off by the men of B company holding the 4th line. At 1pm, a 300-yard-long (270 m) reconnaissance was made on the Ottoman communication trench on the left of the line was conducted and by 11:30pm, whilst under heavy sniper fire, the Hampshire's were relieved by the 36th and 45th Sikhs and sent to rest behind lines.

At 2am on 29 February, the 36th and 45th Sikhs sent two parties of about 50 men each to move further into the trenches to P16 and P13G (see map). The rest of the day was spent consolidating and improving the trenches captured and new communication trenches. At 6pm, a British artillery bombardment shelled Ottoman position and at 6:15, under the cover of the artillery, position P13G was cleared with grenades, though the Turks had anticipated this attack and caused a total of 58 casualties from rifle-fire described as "very hard to locate, and [of] very fine shots". The frontline was established to be Gunning Trench. There was intermittent British artillery fire and consistently accurate Turkish rifle fire until the 31st.

At 12:10pm on 1 February, the two Sikh regiments assaulted the next line of Ottoman trenches that were across open ground. They were both nearly totally decimated whilst crossing no-man's-land due to Turkish artillery and machine guns, but the small remainder managed to kill or drive off the Turks in the first line with bombs and bayonets and advanced further into the second, but found it impractical to consolidate this far with such few men (over 400 casualties were sustained in the first wave). An Ottoman counter-attack focused around point N28 forced the Sikhs back to their starting positions. The 36th now only had three British Officers, one Indian Officer and 85 men remaining. They were reinforced by the 1/4 Devons, the 1/2 Gurkhas and the divisional transport section. The night was spent bringing in the wounded. The Sikhs marched to the divisional camp to rest.

Attacks paused on 2 February. There was sporadic British artillery gunfire in the mid-afternoon. The 1/4 Devons held up Gunning's and Matthew's trench for the day and night and bombs were brought up from friendly lines. Warwick street, a trench running the length of the bank of the Shatt-al-Hai, was dug for a further 504 yards (461 m), and there were patrols in the night that turned out to not be of much effectiveness. The 1/4 Devons and 1/2 Gurkhas were issued orders for an attack the next morning.

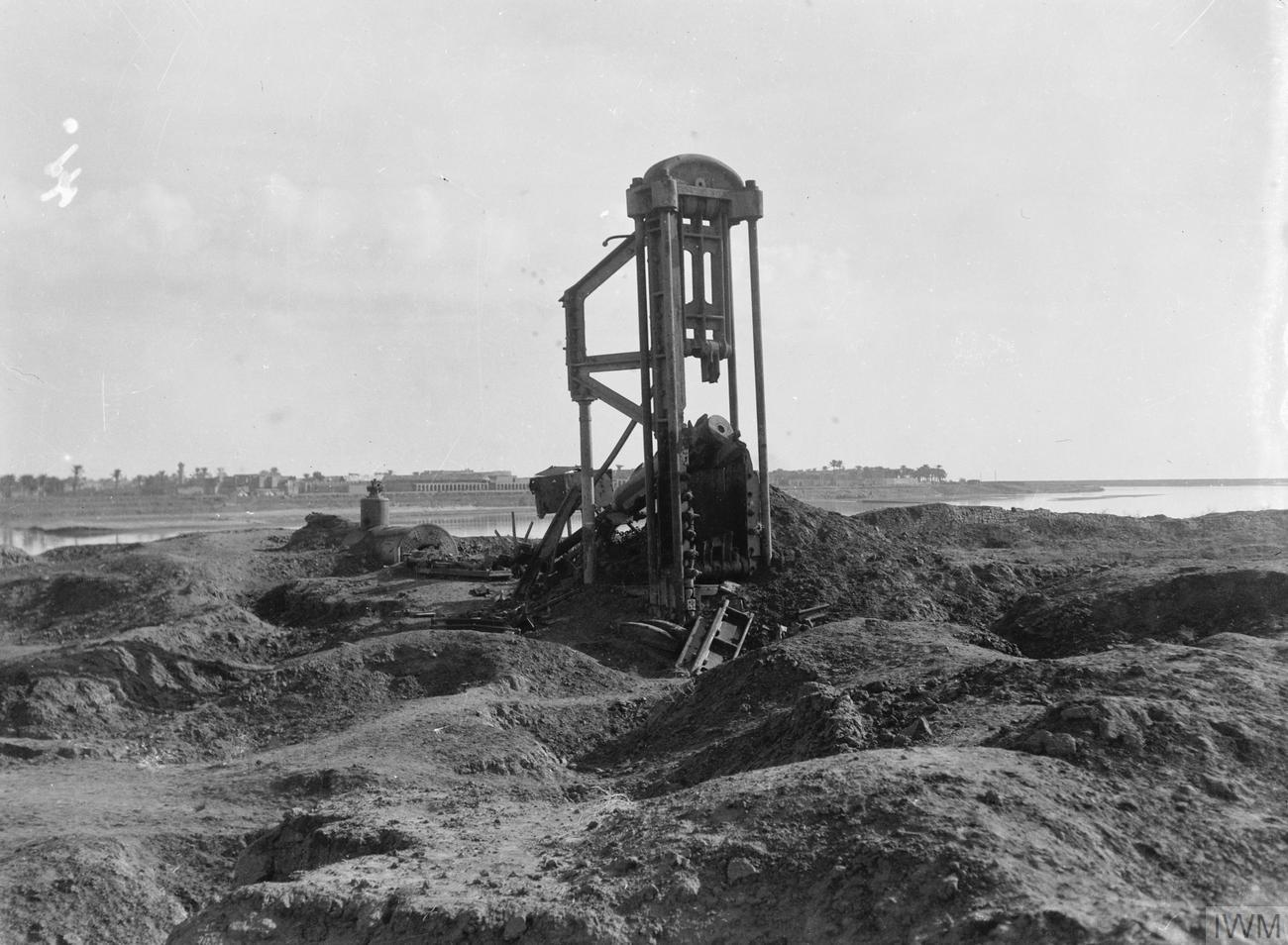
The ruins of the shelled-out Liquorice Factory on the Hai Salient opposite from Kut.

By 8:30am, the Devons and Gurkhas were in position on the parapet for the scheduled attack at 9:40. At 9:26, though, it was received that the attack was to be delayed by an hour. The objectives were the Ottoman front line, notably, the fortified mound at N27 and the double line just to the west of that – to be captured by the 1/2 Gurkhas. At 10:30, the preliminary bombardment was launched, and 10 minutes later, the men advanced, with the artillery continuing to fire. The men lay down in front of the Turkish front line until the bombardment ceased, when they dropped bombs into the trenches – killing many of the defending Turks. The first two lines were taken rapidly. Meanwhile, a party of bombers from the Gurkhas on the far right of the advance, on the bank of the Hai, moved close to N24. The party suffered about 50% casualties due to machine gun fire on the opposite side of the river. However they advanced towards their target setting up trench block (bundles of wood and barbed wire). These blocks were destroyed by friendly forces, but later re-built by the night. The party's CO – 2nd Lieutenant C.E. Dunlop – was killed leading his men towards their objective. The party of bombers held their position in the night and fended off against Turkish counter-attacks of bombs and bayonets. On the left side of the Gurkhas, two platoons advanced into N27 – a well fortified and entrenched mound – and linked up with the Devons. Another company of Gurkhas, led by Captain Hill, reinforced the mound and held off against a Turkish counter-attack from the north-west. The three lines captured were consolidated for the whole rest of the afternoon despite continuous Ottoman shelling and rifle-fire causing casualties on the mound. The 62nd Punjabis moved up to reinforce the line. The night was fairly uneventful except for sniper-fire and the wounded being evacuated via Warwick street and other communication trenches.

Most Ottomans would finally be evacuated from the liquorice factory by 4 February. This was noticed by the 1/2 Gurkhas, who spotted men of the 8th Brigade, who were holding positions on the eastern side of the Hai, advancing into Turkish lines unopposed. In the night, the battalions on the front line on the western bank pushed up by about 1,300 yards (1,200 m). The Gurkha's took position at N21k, and would be replaced by the 82nd Punjabis. It was found that only a few snipers and a defensive contingent of Ottomans remained at the Liquorice factory, though they were strongly positioned. On the 6th, the 82nd sent pickets to N19a, N19b and N20. The picket sent to N19b was found dead, the other two positions dug in. An attack on the factory was planned but cancelled in the night of 7 February. One company was sent to N18a which was the corner of the salient – where the Hai met the Tigris.

The Liquorice factory, and the bazaar it was next to, were captured by A company of the 62nd Punjabis on 10 February after an intense British bombardment. They were found to be in near-complete ruins, with only a couple of houses still standing. The Ottoman perimeter entrenchments were found mostly intanct though, but with no Ottomans in them. Evidence of bridging materials were found – implying that the Turks had crossed the Tigris to Kut in the night. The British-Indian forces now held the Tigris bank from around point M10 to the Hai.

== Action on the Dahra Bend ==
Most of the 13th and all of the 14th Divisions attacked the Dahra Bend on 15 February following an artillery barrage, and positions were taken that night. Meanwhile, a Cavalry Division alongside a brigade from the 13th Division swept further west and occupied the Massaq Canal, which entered the Tigris at the Shumran Bend, the next bend up the Tigris from the Dahra. Maude was now in good position to eventually surround Kut, with I Corps in the east at the Sannaiyat positions, and III Corps to the west of Kut, though on the opposite side of the Tigris.

== Action at Sannaiyat ==
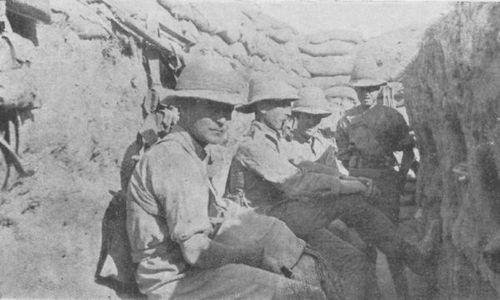
Men of the 2nd Battalion Black Watch of the 21st (Bareilly) Brigade in trenches by Sannaiyat, 1917

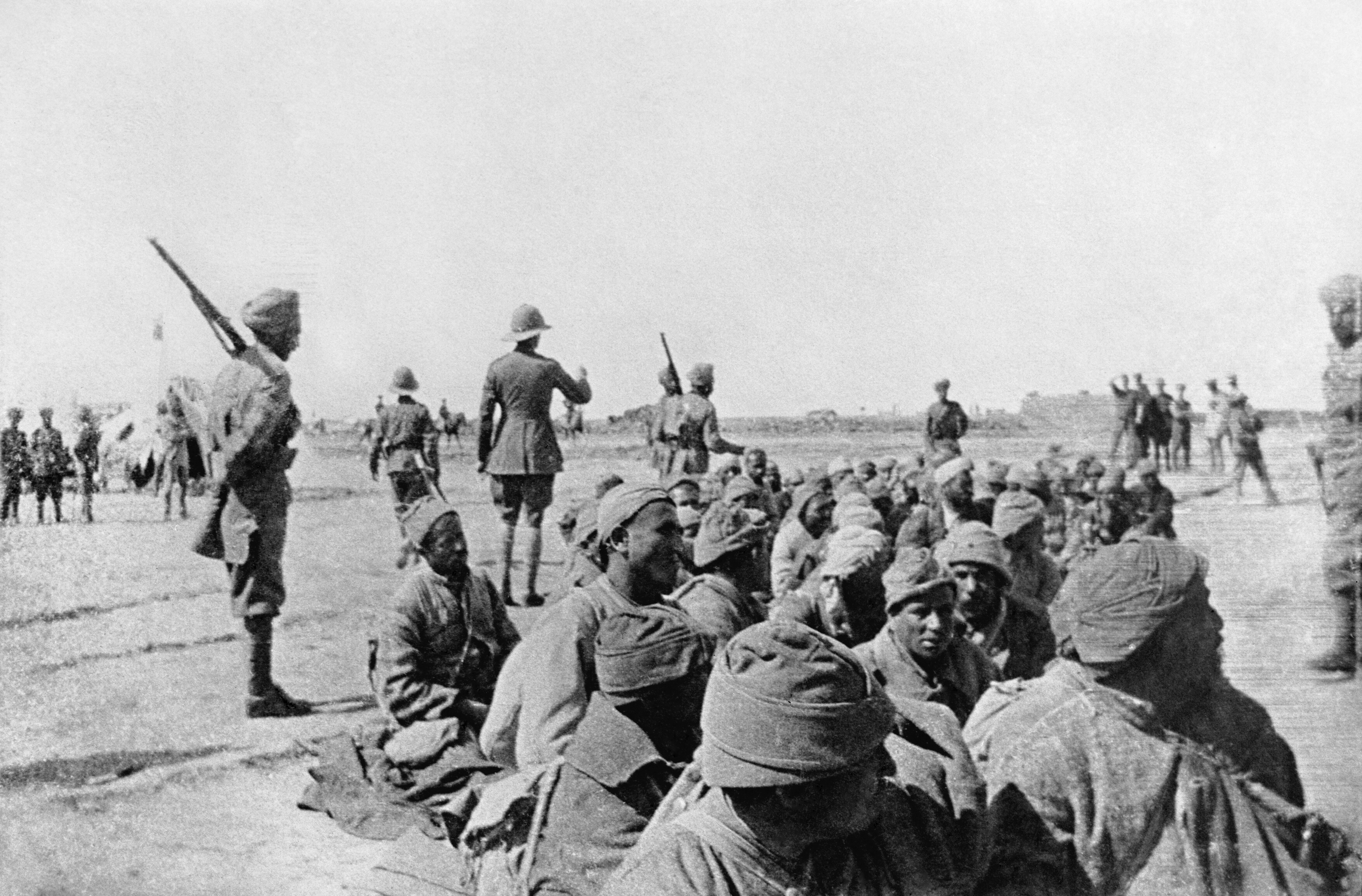
Ottoman Troops captured on 24 February at Sannaiyat. Kâzım Karabekir Bey had already started evacuating his army from Kut by the end of the battle – leaving contingents of defensive troops.

The Turks were known to be withdrawing their troops from the Sannaiyat defences, probably because Kâzım Karabekir Bey realized that the position was increasingly isolated and would inevitably be the object of British attack. On 17 February, the 21st (Bareilly) Brigade of the 7th (Meerut) Division launched an attack on the Sannaiyat positions. There was no preliminary bombardment, so they had the element of surprise, though supporting artillery fire was provided across the bank. The assaulting battalions were delayed by the muddy conditions but managed to reach the front-line trenches without much difficulty. Whilst waiting for reinforcements of the 19th Brigade, accurate Turkish artillery fire alongside a counter-attack drove the 21st back to their own trenches – where they became mixed up with the 19th. No More attacks could be made until order could be restored, and the breakthrough proved to be a failure.

As part of the 19th's advance, an Indian regiment of the 19th were observed to give ground to the right of the 1st Seaforth Highlanders. Two men, Sergeant Steele and Private Winder, took control of a machine gun which the Indians were retiring with, and brought it into action in a gap in the line. This action halted the Turkish advance and allowed the Indians to reform. For their prompt action, Steele was awarded the Victoria Cross, and Winder received the Distinguished Conduct Medal and the Médaille militaire.

There was constant rain between 17 and 21 February, so further attacks were delayed until 22 February, when the 7th Division broke through to the second-line trenches and consolidated there for the loss of 1,332 casualties.

== Crossing the Shumran Bend ==
After the attacks on Sannaiyat, Maude switched focus back to the Hai salient and the advances that could be made from it. He advanced further on this side of the river, which prompted Kâzım Karabekir Bey to stretch his forces across 25 miles (40 km) on the bank on his side of the Tigris in the case of a British crossing. This benefited Maude, as now there was an increase in the likelihood that he could obtain local numerical superiority in his attacks. On 16 February, Bey realized the threat Kut and Baghdad were in, and ordered the XIII corps (which was headed to meet Baratov's advance) to return to Baghdad, though the corps arrived in Baghdad ad hoc due to unavailable resources rather than in a significant force that could threaten Maude. Maude now concentrated for the crossing of the Tigris.

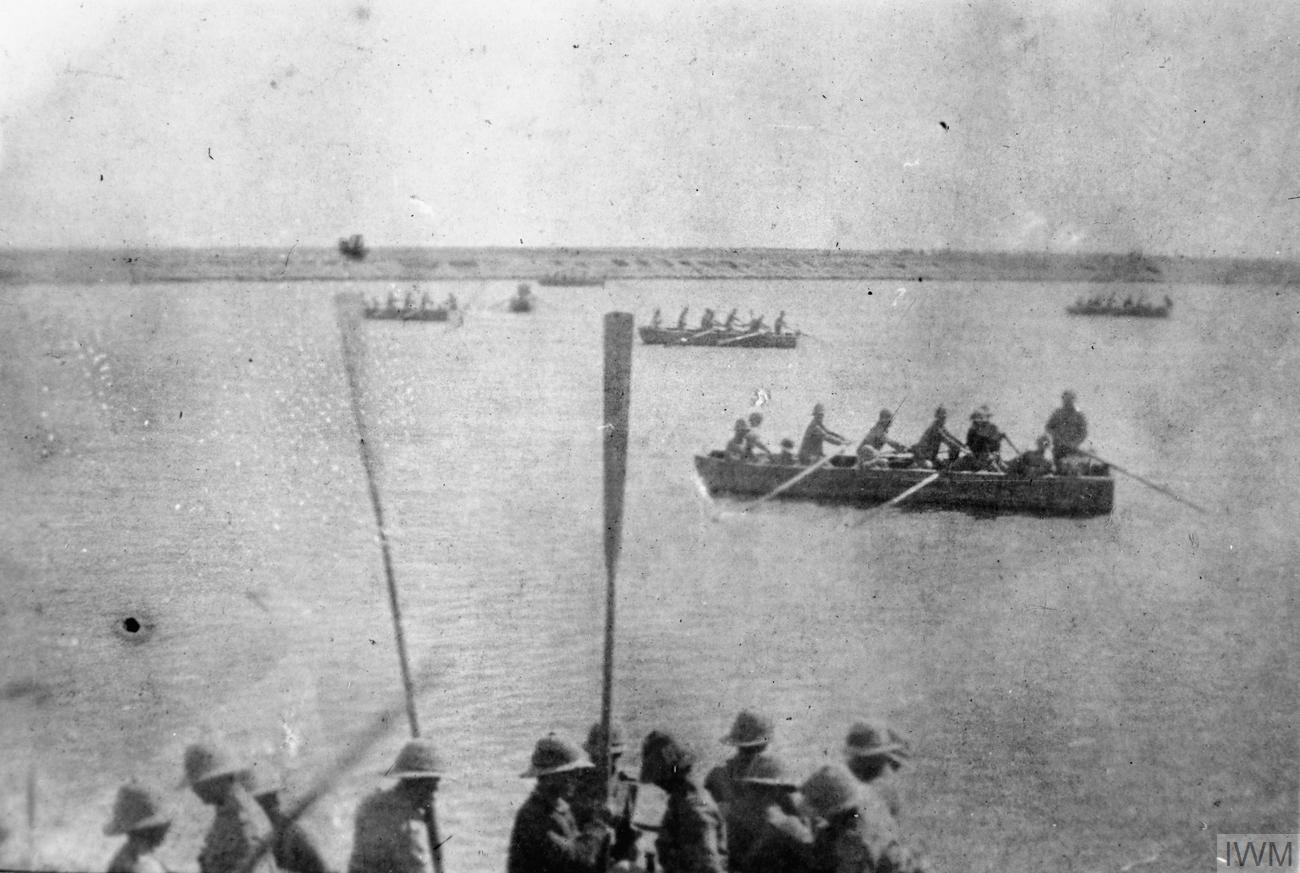
2nd Norfolks and 1/4th Hampshires practicing with pontoons on the Shatt-al-Hai prior to the Tigris Crossing.

Starting at 5:30am on 23 February, the crossing began and was led by Major Campbell Wheeler of the 9th Gurkha Rifles. The plan was to launch three 1,000-foot-long (300 m) pontoon bridges, of which there were rehearsals made on the narrower Shatt-al-Hai. Each "tow" consisted of 13 pontoons with 10 men per pontoon with 5 rowers each: two pontoons were for Lewis gunners and another two for bombers. Many rowers were Southampton waterboatman as a part of the 1/4 Hampshires. One RFC reconnaissance plane was observing troop movements until 5:00pm when a German aircraft became airborne.

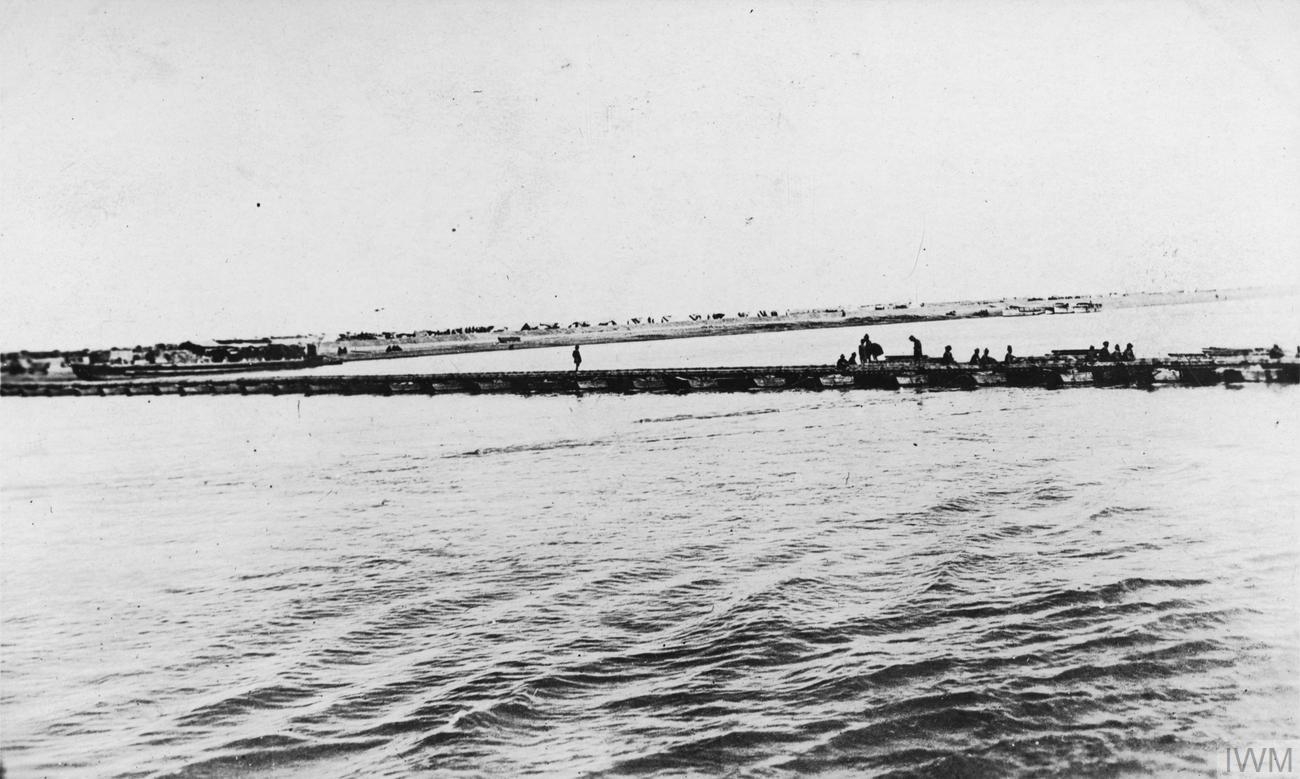
The completed pontoon bridge.

The first tow was led by Major Wheeler who had three second lieutenants in his pontoon and set off at 5:30am but waited 15 minutes until the opposing bank was visible by morning light. Halfway across the river, they began meeting Turkish fire which increased in intensity as they continued. 10 pontoons reached the bank, the 3 others drifted out of control in the strong current. Once on the bank, Wheeler ran 15 yards (14 m) into the Turkish trenches with his Lieutenants: One (Lieutenant Kerr) was wounded in the crossing, and another (Lieutenant Arlington) was killed in the trenches. Lewis Guns were sent to support his flanks, but when one of them jammed, the Ottomans saw an opportunity to counter-attack. During this Ottoman charge back into the British, Wheeler sustained a six-inch (15 cm) gash to his forehead when a Turkish soldier threw his rifle at him, but he continued to fight; killing a Turk who was attempting to bayonet his other Lieutenant, Russell. Major Wheeler continued his advance 200 yards (180 m) from the river. He received the Victoria Cross for his gallantry, and Russell received the Distinguished Service Order.

Pontoons continued to shuttle men and supplies across the river whilst underfire and more continued to be lossed in the current. By mid-afternoon, the 300-yard (270 m) bridge was completed and elements of the 14th division began crossing. The Ottomans disrupted the construction of the other two bridges by throwing timber into the river. By 3:00pm, the covering force of three battalions had crossed the river and secured the bridgehead. By midnight, the whole 14th division had crossed. The crossing cost 350 casualties.

== Entering Kut ==
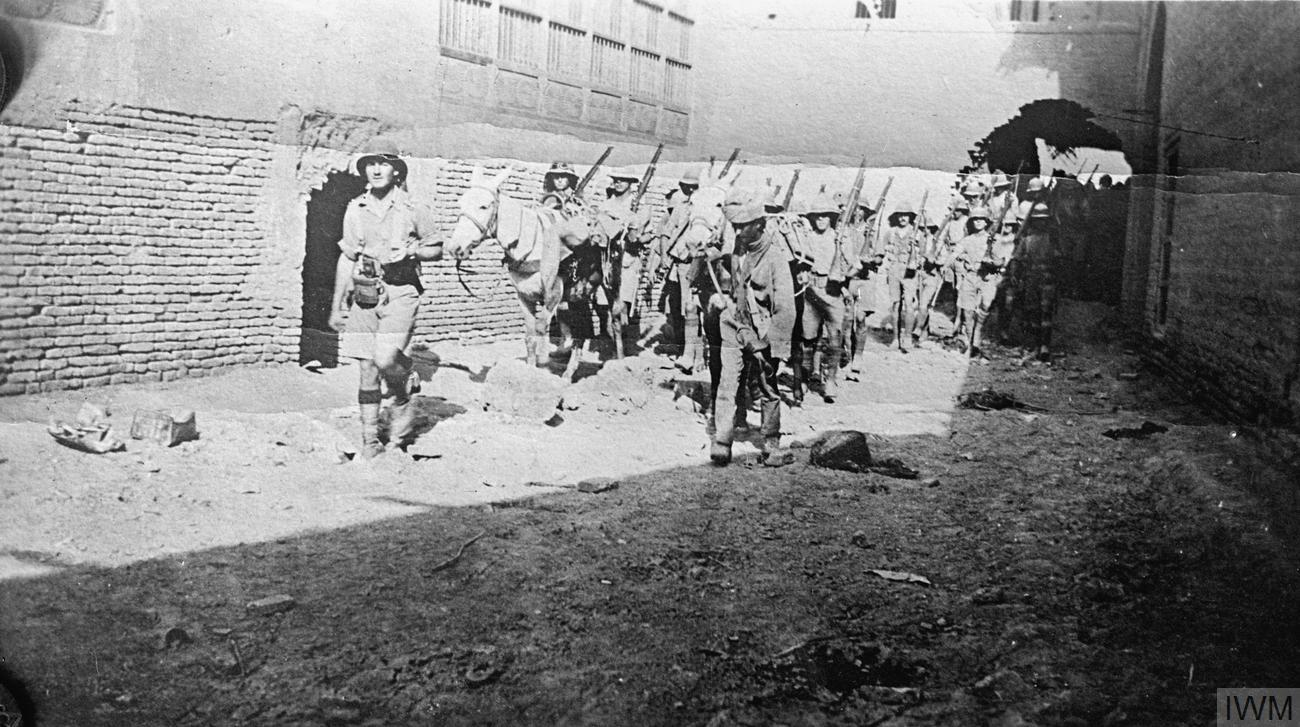
British troops entering the ruins of Kut.

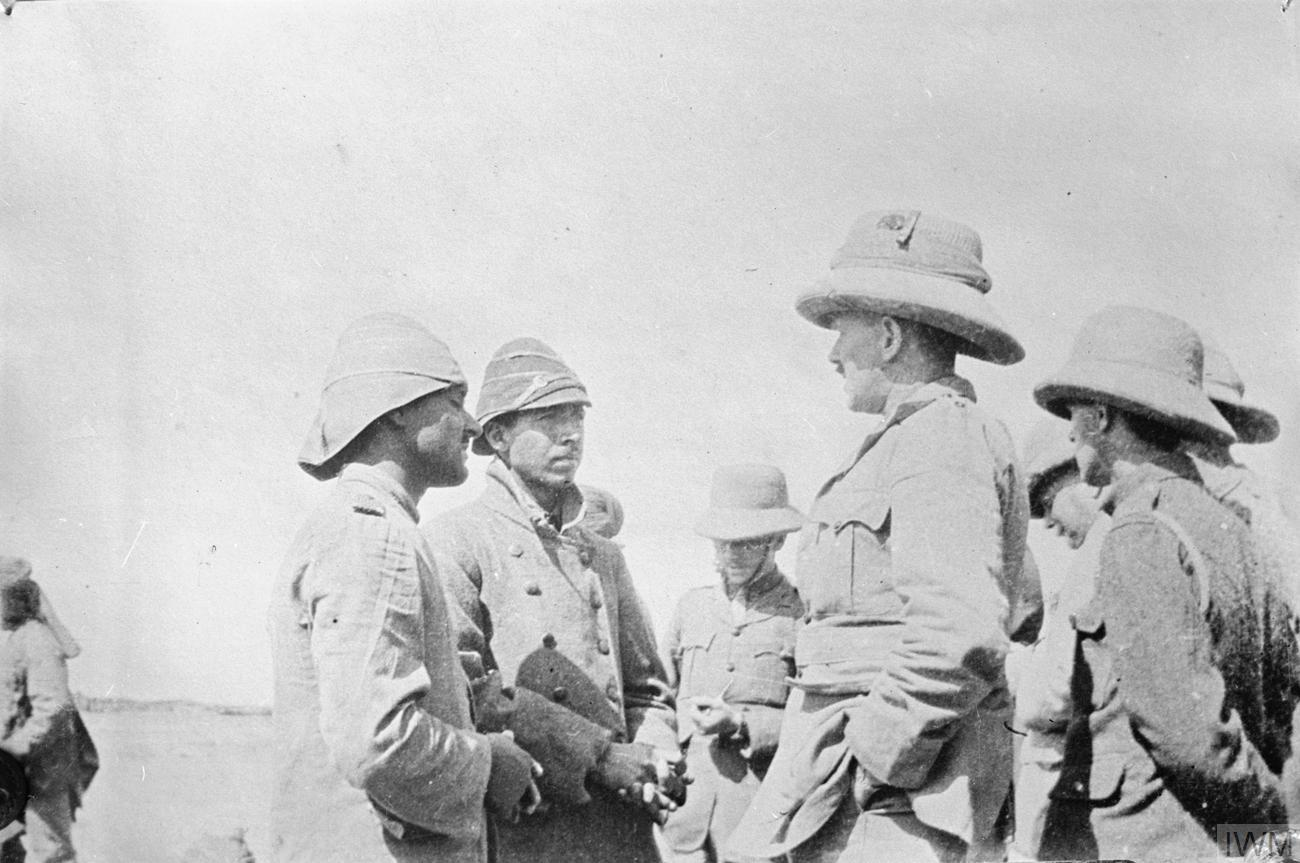
British Officer Interrogating captured Ottomans.

By the evening of 24 February, three Fly Class gunboats – Butterfly, Gadfly, Snakefly – alongside three larger Insect Class gunboats – Mantis, Moth, Tarantula – anchored off Kut and raised the Union flag again in the town. The Town itself was noted to be 'uncannily silent, empty except for cats feasting on the dead and the stench of death everywhere.'

== See also ==
- Siege of Kut
