= 36th Sikhs =

36th Sikh Regiment, 4th Battalion
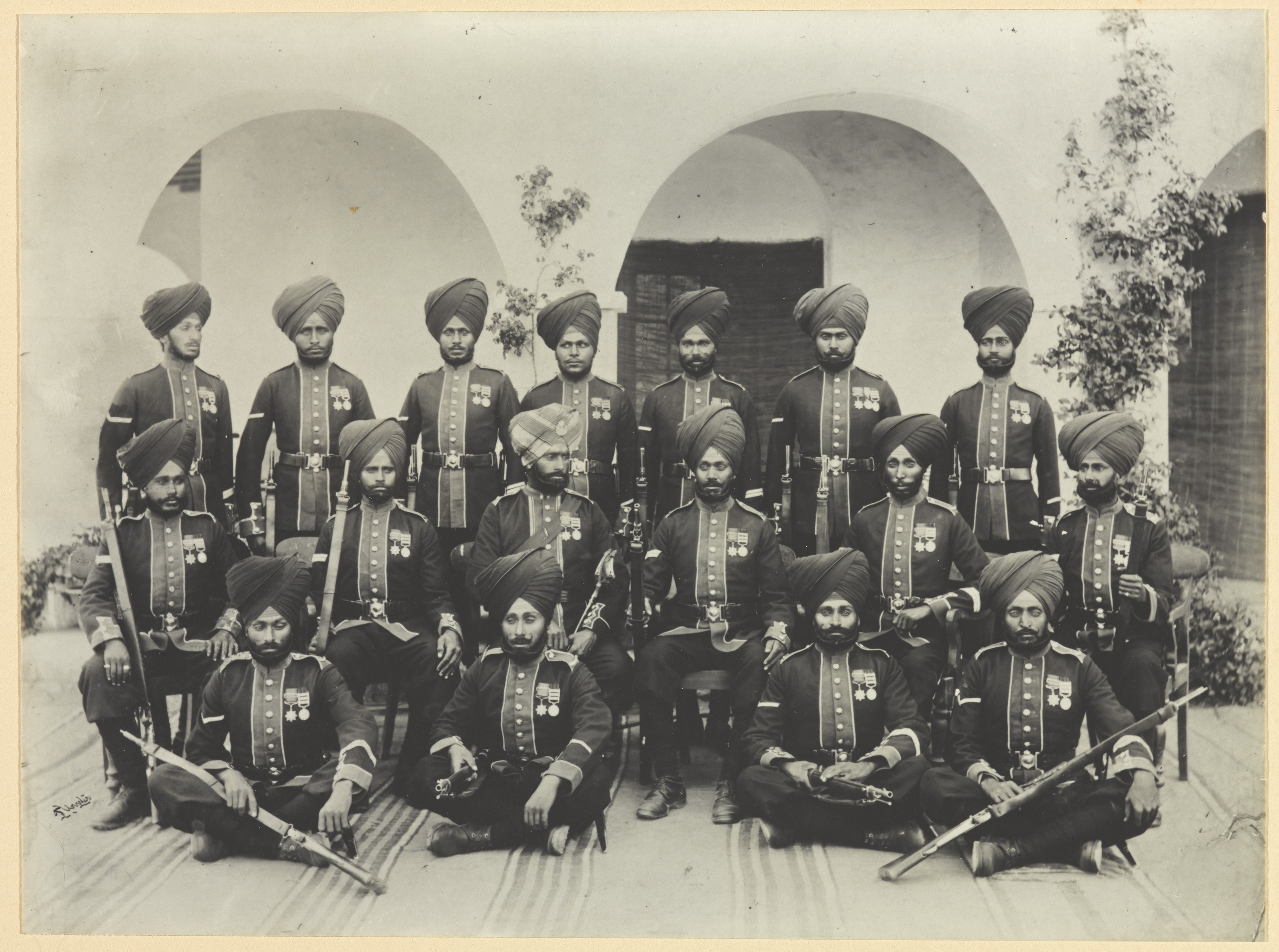
- Group photograph of men of the 36th Sikhs taken in 1897
- Active: 1887-1922
- Country: Indian Empire
- Branch: Army
- Type: Infantry
- Part of: Bengal Army (to 1895); Bengal Command
- Nickname: Akal Murat
- Mottos: Bole So Nihaal, Sat Sri Akal
- Uniform: Scarlet; faced yellow, turbans
- Engagements: Punjab Frontier; Samana; Saragarhi

The 36th Sikhs was an infantry regiment in the British Indian Army. They could trace their origins to 1887, when they were the 36th (Sikh) Bengal Infantry. Composed of Jat Sikhs, it was created by Colonel Jim Cooke and Captain H. R. Holmes. They had one other change in title in 1901, when they became the 36th Sikh Infantry. They finally became the 36th Sikhs in 1903, after the Kitchener reforms of the Indian Army. During this time they fought an action in 1897, in defence of the Samana Ridge against a huge army of Pathans in the Battle of Saragarhi. To honour the visit of the Prince and Princess of Wales to India they took part in the Rawalpindi Parade 1905. During World War I they were stationed as part of the Garrison of Tianjin in China and took part in the Siege of Tsingtao.

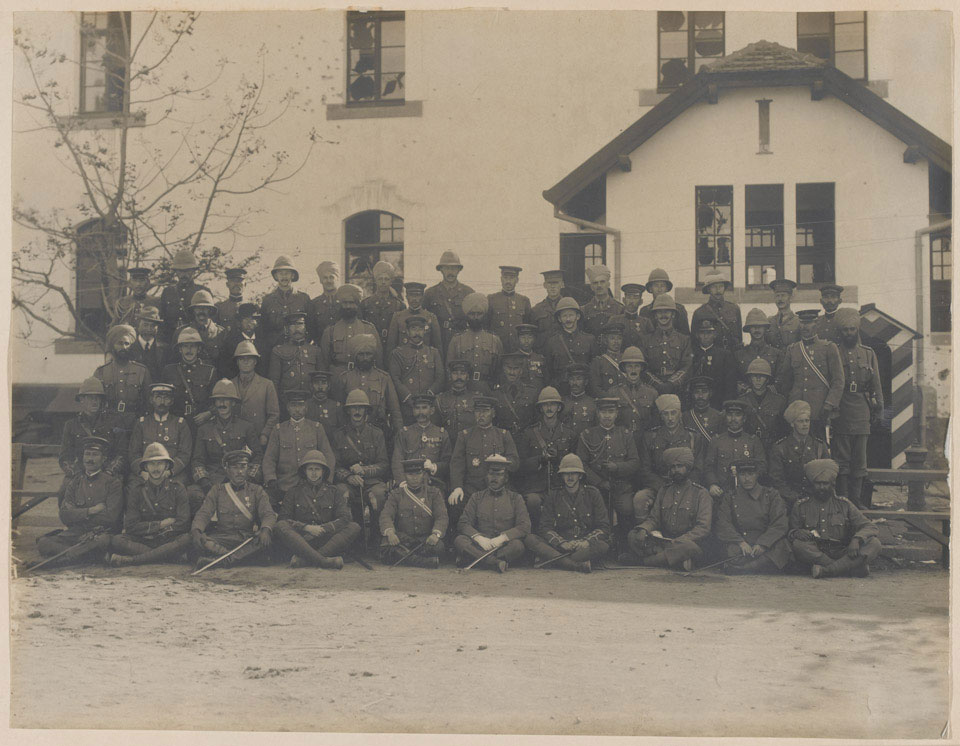
A detachment of the 36th Sikhs along with the 2nd Battalion, The South Wales Borderers, sent to assist the Japanese in capturing Germany's naval base at Tsingtao (Qingdao) in China, 1914.

After World War I, the Indian government reformed the army again moving from single battalion regiment to multi battalion regiments. The 36th Sikhs became the 4th Battalion 11th Sikh Regiment. After independence this was one of the regiments allocated to the new Indian Army.

== In popular culture ==
The 36th Sikhs and the Battle of Saragarhi are dramatized in the Indian Hindi-language movie Kesari, released in 2019.

== Sources ==
- Barthorp, Michael; Burn, Jeffrey (1979). Indian infantry regiments 1860-1914. Osprey Publishing. ISBN 0-85045-307-0.
- Sumner, Ian (2001). The Indian Army 1914-1947. Osprey Publishing. ISBN 1-84176-196-6.
