= Robert Palmer (British writer) =

British lawyer and soldier (1888–1916)

The Honourable Robert Palmer
- Palmer in 1911
- Born: 26 September 1888; London, England
- Died: 21 January 1916 (aged 27); Hanna defile, Ottoman Empire
- Alma mater: University College, Oxford
- Military career
- Branch: British Army
- Service years: 1913–1916
- Rank: Captain
- Unit: Hampshire Regiment
- Known for: Writing and legal work
- Conflicts: First World War; Battle of Sheikh Sa'ad; Battle of Wadi; Battle of Hanna
- Memorials: Basra Memorial, altarpiece at Winchester College

The Honourable Robert Stafford Arthur Palmer (26 September 1888 – 21 January 1916) was a British Army officer, barrister and poet. Palmer was born into an aristocratic family. He was the son of William Palmer, 2nd Earl of Selborne, grandson of Robert Gascoyne-Cecil, 3rd Marquess of Salisbury, and cousin to Sir Edward Grey. Palmer was educated at Colet Court and Winchester College and developed an interest in the Church of England and law at an early age. He won a scholarship to University College, Oxford, where he studied classical moderations and literae humaniores (classics). At university he was president of the Oxford University Church Union and the Oxford Union debating society. In between studies he volunteered at the Oxford House Church of England settlement and campaigned in support of the Liberal Unionist Party.

After graduation Palmer made a trip to India, an account of which was published as A Little Tour in India. From 1912 he served as governor at Edghill House in Sydenham, a school providing education to the poor. He turned down an offer to become dean of Divinity at New College, Oxford, to pursue a career in law. He was called to the bar at the Inner Temple in 1913 and in 1914 prosecuted his first case on the Western Circuit.

The First World War interrupted Palmer's short legal career. He had joined one of the Hampshire Regiment's Territorial Force battalions as a second lieutenant in 1913 and was mobilised shortly before Britain joined the war. He was promoted to lieutenant and posted with his unit to India where he received the temporary rank of captain. He commanded a draft of men sent for service with another of his regiment's battalions in the Mesopotamian campaign in August 1915. A football injury prevented him from accompanying his men during the advance on Kut. Palmer recovered sufficiently by the end of December to join the force sent to try to relieve the siege of Kut, where the first force had been surrounded. He was killed during the defeat at the Battle of Hanna. A poem Palmer had composed on the campaign was published in The Times shortly before his death. He is remembered on the Basra Memorial and by an altarpiece at Winchester College.

== Birth and family ==
Palmer was born on 26 September 1888 at 20 Arlington Street, London. This was the house of his grandfather Robert Gascoyne-Cecil, 3rd Marquess of Salisbury, who was at that time the Conservative Party prime minister of the United Kingdom. Palmer was the second son of Salisbury's daughter Maud and William Palmer, Viscount Wolmer. His father was a politician of the Liberal Unionist Party (allied to the Conservatives) who went on to hold high office as First Lord of the Admiralty and entered the House of Lords as the 2nd Earl of Selborne.

Robert Palmer was known to friends and family as Bobby. His forenames came from Lord Salisbury (Robert) and his two godfathers, the Conservative politician (and future prime minister) Arthur Balfour and Conservative politician Sir Henry Stafford Northcote. He was cousin to the Liberal politician and future Foreign Secretary Sir Edward Grey.

== Early life ==
Palmer aspired to a career in law from the age of six, though he maintained an interest in nature, collecting butterflies and birds' eggs. At the age of eight he was sent to Colet Court, the preparatory school of St Paul's School in Hammersmith, London, and rose to become its head boy. In 1901 he received his confirmation in the Church of England from Edward Talbot, Bishop of Rochester, and afterwards maintained a strong faith. Palmer served as a page to the queen at the 9 August 1902 coronation of Edward VII and Alexandra.

Palmer joined Winchester College, a fee-paying public school in Hampshire, in September 1902. In the winter of 1905/06 Palmer visited his family in Southern Africa where his father was serving as High Commissioner. Palmer did well at Winchester, becoming senior commoner prefect in 1907, in which role he banned most corporal punishment, and head of his house. He won school prizes in English, history and Greek. At the school he authored his first published work, an article titled "The Labour Problem in South Africa" which appeared in the July 1906 National Review. He returned to Southern Africa to visit his family again in late spring 1907. He won a scholarship to University College, Oxford, as top of the 157 entrants.

== University ==
At Oxford Palmer studied the classical moderations and literae humaniores (classics). He continued his interest in Christianity and became a close friend of the future theologian Nathaniel Micklem. He volunteered at Oxford House, a Church of England settlement in East London, where he provided legal advice to the poor. He also participated in a missionary campaign in South London in autumn 1908. He was president of the Oxford University Church Union from June 1909 and in this role introduced a new service book for use at the university; this had been partly written by his uncle Lord Hugh Cecil.

Palmer also became involved in the Oxford Union debating society. His first speech there was against the government's plans for reform of the House of Lords. He was elected secretary of the Union in November 1908, junior librarian in March 1909 and president in November 1909. Whilst at Oxford Palmer also began a novel, never finished, entitled Wentworth's Reform. He supported the Liberal Unionist Party and canvassed for them at the December 1910 United Kingdom general election. He did not canvass at Newton-le-Willows for his brother Roundell Palmer, in case he was mistaken for him, but did so at Bradford West where his brother-in-law Ernest Flower was defeated. Palmer graduated from Oxford with a first class degree in 1911.

== Law career ==
In 1911 Palmer made a trip to India, on his return he published an account of this as A Little Tour in India. Palmer then became a resident worker at Oxford House. In 1912 he was appointed a governor of the recently established Edghill House in Sydenham, which provided education to the poor. He declined an offer to become dean of divinity at New College, Oxford, in favour of a career in the law.

Palmer was called to the bar at the Inner Temple in November 1913. He was pupilled to Howard Wright of Lincoln's Inn, working from the same barristers' chambers that his grandfather Roundell Palmer, 1st Earl of Selborne, a lord chancellor, had worked from. From June 1914 Palmer worked on the Western Circuit. On 14 July 1914 he prosecuted his first case in the Winchester County Quarter Sessions.

== First World War ==
Palmer joined the 6th (Duke of Connaught's Own) Battalion of the Hampshire Regiment on 6 February 1913 as a second lieutenant. This was a part-time Territorial Force unit. Palmer served initially in G Company, based in Petersfield. He joined the annual training camp of the battalion at Bulford Camp on Salisbury Plain in late July 1914. The unit was mobilised for service in the First World War whilst on exercise.

Palmer was promoted to lieutenant on 2 September 1914. His unit was posted to Dinapur, India, in October 1914. Palmer switched to F Company and then to D Company, when the unit switched from eight companies to four, in line with regular army battalions. Palmer was posted to command a detachment of 1.5 companies sent to Agra and while there implemented a reform to the catering provided for the men. He later served at the hill station of Simla. On 2 April Palmer was promoted to the temporary rank of captain.

In August 1915 Palmer was sent to Mesopotamia in command of a draft of men for service with the regiment's 4th Battalion which was serving in the Mesopotamian campaign. Upon joining the 4th battalion Palmer was assigned as second-in-command of A Company. One of Palmer's poems, "How Long, O Lord", was published in the Times in October 1915.

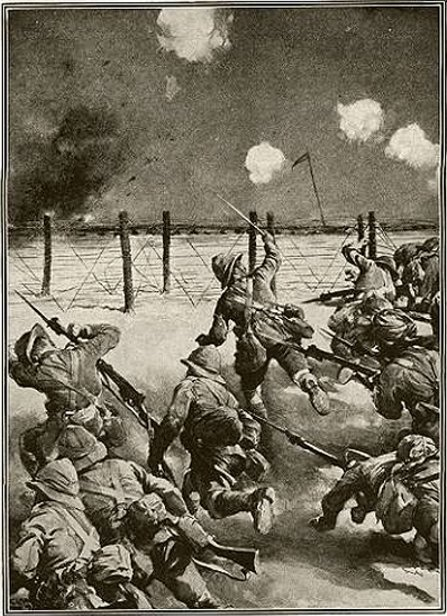
British troops in action near Kut, September 1915

On 24 November, while stationed at Amarah, Palmer sprained his leg whilst playing football. Despite his best efforts to join the march he was left in medical care when half of the battalion, including his company, was sent to fight in the Battle of Ctesiphon, the next step on an offensive towards Baghdad. Palmer spent the next five weeks in hospital recovering. He spent the time giving lectures, including one on 22 December about the rise of Germany as a world power that was attended by a general.

The British offensive had become bogged down and besieged at Kut. Palmer was assigned to join an expedition sent to its relief. He left Amarah with this force on 31 December 1915. Palmer took part in the 6–8 January Battle of Sheikh Sa'ad and 13 January Battle of Wadi on the march towards Kut.

At the 21 January Battle of Hanna Palmer was second-in-command of his battalion's D Company, which formed the third line of an assault on a Turkish trench line. The battalion came under heavy fire as it advanced and reached, but could not hold, the Turkish trench. Palmer was wounded in the leg around 200 yards (180 m) in front of the trench but continued to advance. He was reported to be the only officer of the battalion to proceed beyond the trench where he was hit again whilst trying to rally his men to defend against a counterattack.

Out of the 310 men of the battalion who fought in the defeat at Hanna, only 51 escaped unwounded. Palmer was reported missing, presumed captured. His parents were notified that he was missing in February but his death in captivity was confirmed by the Red Crescent on 14 March. Writer and naval division soldier A. P. Herbert wrote to Palmer's parents in May 1916 to relate the events around his death. He said Palmer had been badly wounded in the chest and was attended by doctors and visited by a colonel but died four hours after arriving at the prisoner-of-war camp hospital. Queen Alexandra sent a message of sympathy to Palmer's parents.

Kut was recaptured by the British in February 1917 after which Palmer's battalion chaplain searched unsuccessfully for his grave. He is commemorated on the Basra Memorial to those who died in the Mesopotamian campaign but whose graves are not known. He is also commemorated by an altarpiece at Winchester College. The piece depicts a soldier and his mother and was erected to also commemorate Lieutenant Wilmot Babington Parker-Smith, son of James Parker Smith. The altarpiece was dedicated by the Prince of Wales in 1923. Palmer's letters from Mesopotamia in 1915 and 1916 were published, with some of his poetry, as Letters from Mesopotamia in 1916. A biography of Palmer by Lady Laura Ridding was published by Hodder & Stoughton in 1921.

== "How Long, O Lord" ==
The poem is thought to have been composed in Mesopotamia in 1915 and a copy was sent by Palmer's mother to American peace activist Jane Addams. The poem was featured in episode 23 of the documentary TV series The Great War. As reproduced in Poetry of the First World War:

How long O Lord, how long, before the flood
Of crimson-welling carnage shall abate?
From sodden plains in West and East the blood
Of kindly men streams up in mists of hate,
Polluting Thy clean air: and nations great
In reputation of the arts that bind
The world with hopes of Heaven, sink to the state
Of brute barbarianism whose ferocious mind
Gloats o’er the bloody havoc of their kind,
Not knowing love or mercy. Lord, how long
Shall Satan in high places lead the blind
To battle for the passions of the strong?
Oh, touch Thy children’s hearts, that they may know
Hate their most hateful, pride their deadliest foe.
