= Fenton Aylmer (disambiguation) =

Fenton Aylmer (1862–1935) was a Victoria Cross recipient and 13th Aylmer baronet.

Fenton Aylmer may also refer to:

- Sir Fenton Aylmer, 7th Baronet (1770–1816) of the Aylmer baronets
- Sir Fenton Aylmer, 15th Baronet (1901–1987) of the Aylmer baronets
- Captain Fenton John Aylmer (1835–1862) of the Aylmer baronets family
- Fenton Aylmer (born 1965), heir apparent to the Aylmer baronets
