= Battle of Wadi (1916) =

1916 siege

- Part of the Mesopotamian campaign of World War I
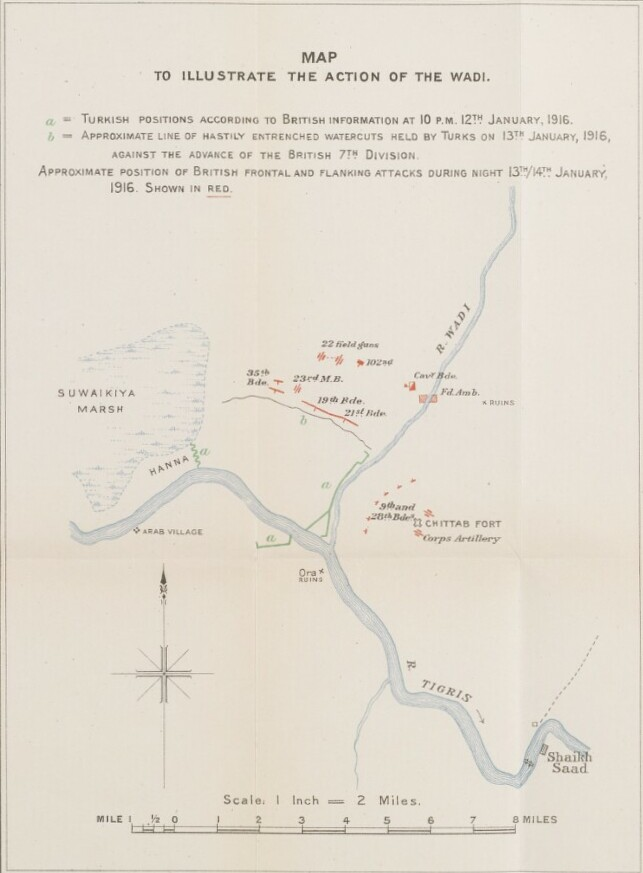
- A 1924 British map showing action at the Wadi
Date	13 January 1916
Location	Hanna defile, 3.5 miles (5.6 km) east of Sheikh Sa'ad, Ottoman Iraq
Result	Ottoman victory

Belligerents
British Empire: India; United Kingdom	Ottoman Empire: German Empire (military commanders)

Commanders and leaders
(United Kingdom of Great Britain and Ireland) Fenton Aylmer (United Kingdom of Great Britain and Ireland) George Younghusband (United Kingdom of Great Britain and Ireland) George Kemball	(German Empire) Colmar von der Goltz (Ottoman Empire) Halil Pasha

Strength
19,000	20,000

Casualties and losses
1,600 dead or wounded, numerous captured	527 casualties unknown, estimated minor

The Battle of Wadi, occurring on 13 January 1916, was an unsuccessful attempt by British forces fighting in Ottoman Iraq during World War I to relieve beleaguered forces under Sir Charles Townshend then under siege by the Ottoman Sixth Army at Kut-al-Amara.

Pushed by regional British Commander-in-Chief Sir John Nixon, General Fenton Aylmer launched an attack against Ottoman defensive positions on the banks of the Wadi River. The Wadi was a steep valley of a stream that ran from the north into the River Tigris, some 6 miles (9.7 km) upstream towards Kut-al-Amara from Sheikh Sa'ad. The attack is generally considered as a failure, as although Aylmer managed to capture the Wadi, it cost him 1,600 men. The British failure led to Townshend's surrender, along with 10,000 of his men, in the largest single surrender of British troops up to that time. However, the British recaptured Kut in February 1917, on their way to the capture of Baghdad sixteen days later on 11 March 1917.

== Background ==
On 5 December 1915, Ottoman forces under the command of Halil Kut and the German commander Baron von der Goltz, surrounded an Anglo-Indian force of 25,000 men and began the Siege of Kut-Al Amara, a city 50 miles (80 km) south of Baghdad. Replying to pleas for help from Major Charles Townshend, Mesopotamian Theatre commander Sir John Nixon dispatched the British Tigris Corps of 19,000 men under Lieutenant General Sir Fenton Aylmer to relieve the besieged garrison.

The first attempt to relieve Kut (the Battle of Sheikh Sa'ad) came on 6 January 1916. Aylmer's advance force, under Major-General George Younghusband, moved forward from Ali Al-Gharbi towards Sheikh Sa'ad along both banks of the Tigris. Younghusband's column made contact with the Ottomans on the morning of 6 January, 3.5 miles (5.6 km) east of Sheikh Sa'ad. British efforts to defeat the Ottomans were unsuccessful. British casualties were heavy amounting to 4,202, including 133 officers. Following this, the Ottoman forces voluntarily abandoned their position on 9 January for an unknown reason, and retired 10 miles (16 km) upstream to the Wadi.

== Preparations for the battle ==
Aylmer's troops were exhausted and demoralized as they continued to make their way up the Tigris toward Kut. Their progress was hampered by the region's typical shortage of available roads and supply routes. Aylmer planned to outflank the Wadi position, capture the Hanna Defile and surround the Ottoman force. The 28th Indian Brigade of the 7th (Meerut) Division under Brigadier General George Kemball would attack the Wadi trenches frontally, while the rest of the Tigris Corps moved around the flank. However, the British troops were hampered by having no accurate maps of the area, so much of the planning was left to chance.

Meanwhile, the Ottoman army, under new regional commander Halil Pasha, set up new and firmer defensive positions—with some 20,000 troops—along the banks of the smaller Wadi River, through which the British would have to pass to reach Kut.

== Battle of Wadi ==
The attack, which began in the early afternoon of 13 January—postponed from the morning because of a persistent mist and a slow advance by artillery across the river—quickly lost the intended element of surprise, as the outnumbered British forces on both sides of enemy lines struggled to assert themselves against a robust Ottoman defense. Kemball made a frontal advance, while Younghusband, with the bulk of the British force, attempted a wide turning movement. The delay seriously affected the chances of success, as small-arms and artillery fire from the alerted Ottoman forces began to halt the British infantry movements.

Lacking proper maps, the leading British column became lost. Seizing the opportunity, the Ottoman units began to wheel around from a north–south orientation to an east–west, to face the British flanking manoeuvre. The resulting frontal attack by the 28th Brigade was repulsed with heavy casualties.

By dusk, it became clear that the attempt had failed. British troops, attempting to manoeuvre around the Ottoman flanks, failed to reach the river, and the mouth of the Hanna Defile was still strongly held by the entrenched Ottoman troops. Aylmer called off the attack by the end of the day and ferried most of his remaining troops to the right bank of the Tigris.

By this time, Aylmer's troops had gained control of the Wadi, but it was a small advance that was unworthy of the 1,600 men killed or wounded (including 40 British officers) in the attack and did little to bring relief closer to Townshend's beleaguered forces at Kut. The provision of adequate medical capacity and supplies had not improved significantly since the appalling debacle at Sheikh Sa'ad, so again many casualties suffered without treatment or evacuation for several days.

== Aftermath ==
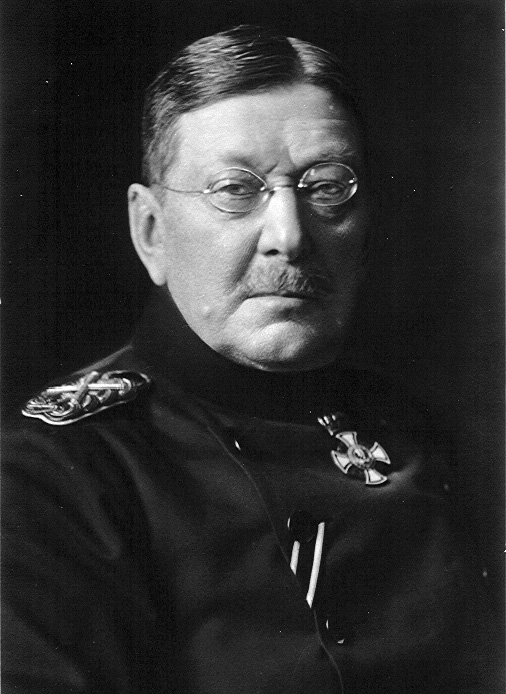
Colmar Freiherr von der Goltz – the victorious German commander leading the Ottoman troops

The British continued to attempt to break through the Ottoman lines over the coming months in order to rescue their brethren in Kut, all of which were unsuccessful. In April 1916, after nearly five months under siege, Townshend finally submitted, along with 10,000 of his men, in the largest single surrender of British troops up to that time.

Through mistreatment and neglect leading to starvation, nearly 5,000 British prisoners died before the end of the war. The Siege of Kut was an important Ottoman victory, greatly raising the morale of Ottoman soldiers and prestige for the Ottoman Army in the Middle East. The British government on the other hand was forced to pour more resources into Mesopotamia.

The British captured Kut in February 1917 on their way to the capture of Baghdad sixteen days later on 11 March 1917. The humiliation the British faced due to the loss of Kut had been partially rectified. The Ottoman government was forced to end its military operations in Persia and try to build up a new army to prevent the British from moving on to capture of Mosul.

Sepoy Chatta Singh of the 9th Bhopal Infantry was awarded the Victoria Cross for his actions at the battle.
