= Donadea =

Civil parish in County Kildare, Ireland

Donadea (Irish: Domhnach Dheá) is a civil parish in the barony of Ikeathy and Oughterany in the north of County Kildare, Ireland. There are seven townlands in the parish. There are no large centres of population in the parish. Donadea is noted for its public forest park which is one of the most popular outdoor venues in County Kildare. The nearest villages are Staplestown (4 km distant) and Prosperous (7 km distant). The parish name is derived from a church, traditionally said to have been founded by Saint Patrick. A small 17th-century church of the Church of Ireland, St Peter's, still exists within the Donadea demesne.

== Townlands ==
The civil parish of Donadea contains the townlands: Cooltrim North, Cooltrim South, Donadea, Donadea Demesne, Kilmurry, Kilnamoragh North, and Kilnamoragh South, Gilltown.

== Demesne ==
The Normans came to Donadea in the 12th century and established a manor. The manor house was built on or close to the present castle. This structure was the first of many castles on the site throughout the Middle Ages. In 1558 the Aylmer family acquired the manor. In 1581, Gerald Aylmer commenced a new tower in Donadea which was not completed until 1624. It is now the oldest part of the Castle. In 1626, he repaired the medieval church. Gerald was ennobled as the first Baronet of Donadea.

== Ecclesiastical parish ==
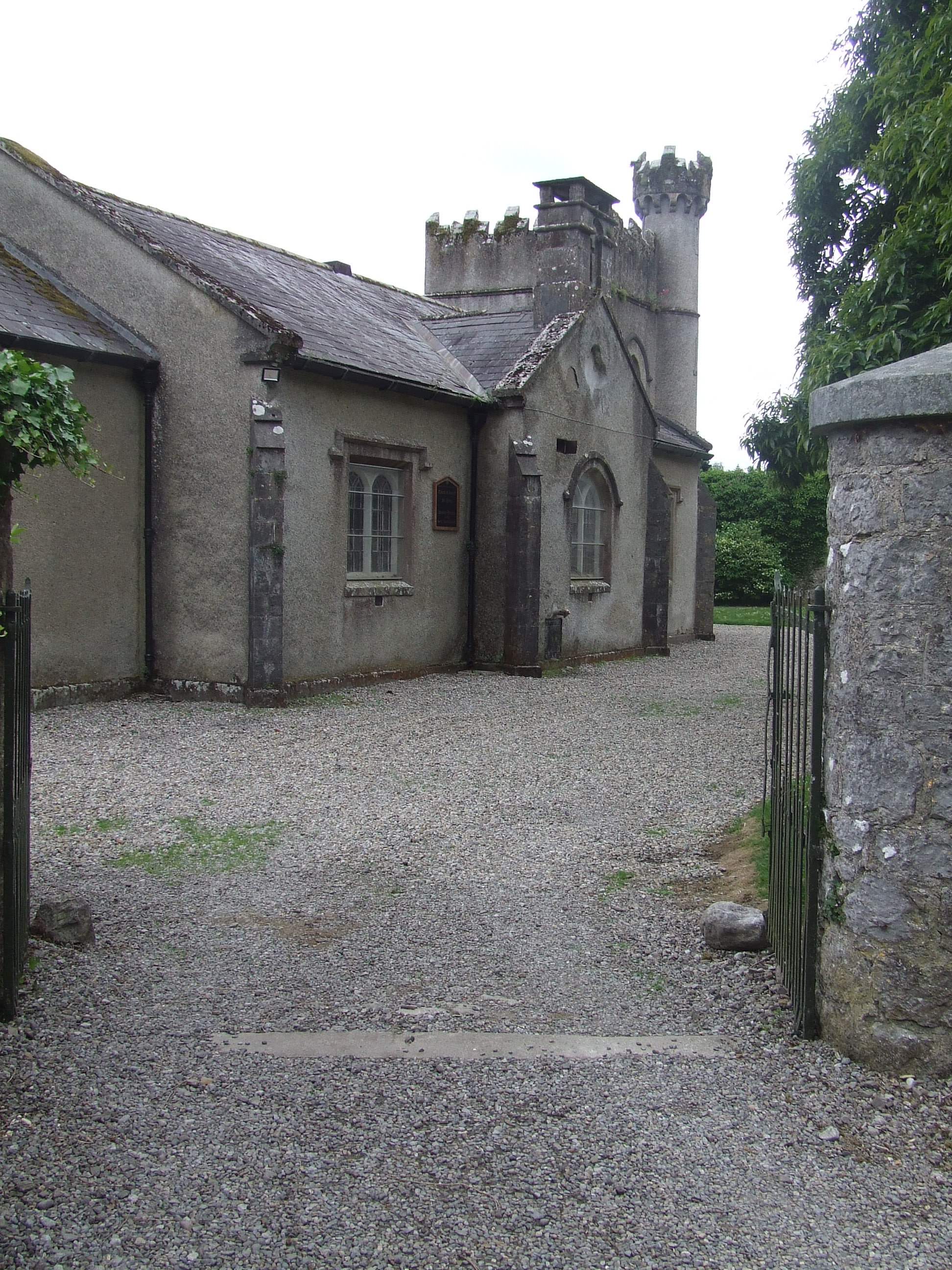
St Peter's Church, Donadea demesne.

The Book of Armagh records St Patrick’s visit to Dunmurraghill in 455, where he marked out the foundations for a religious settlement. The St. Peter’s site was laid out at the same time. The earliest churches were wooden in construction. The Danes destroyed Dunmurraghill in 832. The church at the St. Peter’s site was rebuilt by the Normans. In 1550 the Aylmer family of Lyons acquired the Manor of Donadea from the Earls of Ormond. In 1626 the first Aylmer baronet, Sir Gerald Aylmer, rebuilt the church. The Ecclesiastical Report of 1809 stated that: "the Church was in a tottering state but neat and clean.". It is now part of the Clane Union of Parishes. In the Catholic Church, the territory is part of the parish of "Clane and Rathcoffey" in the Roman Catholic Diocese of Kildare and Leighlin. The Church of St Patrick and St Brigidin is located in Clane while the Church of the Sacred Heart is located in Rathcoffey.

== Forest ==
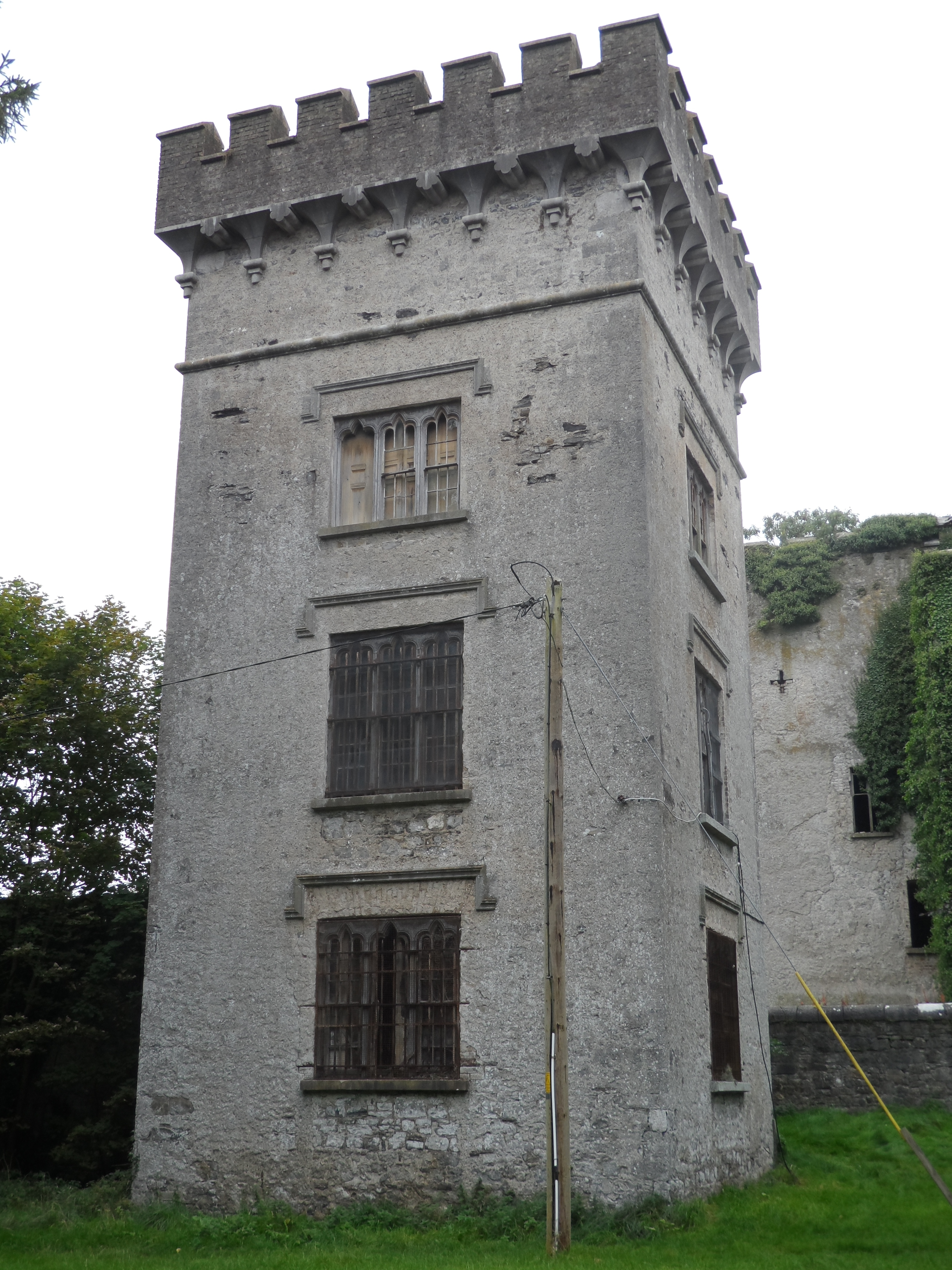
Tower of Donadea Castle, built in 1624.

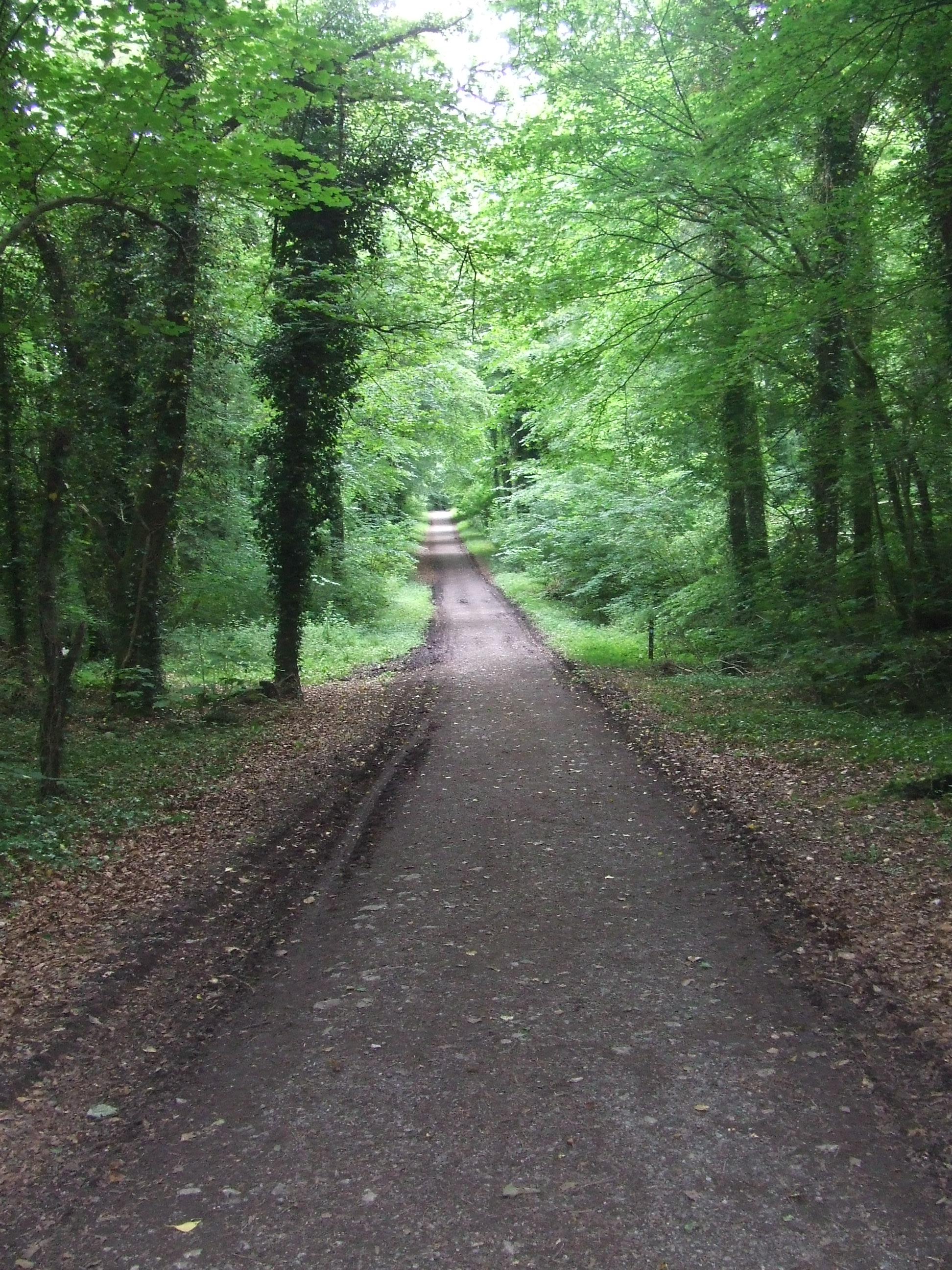
Aylmer Walk, Donadea Forest Park, June 2014

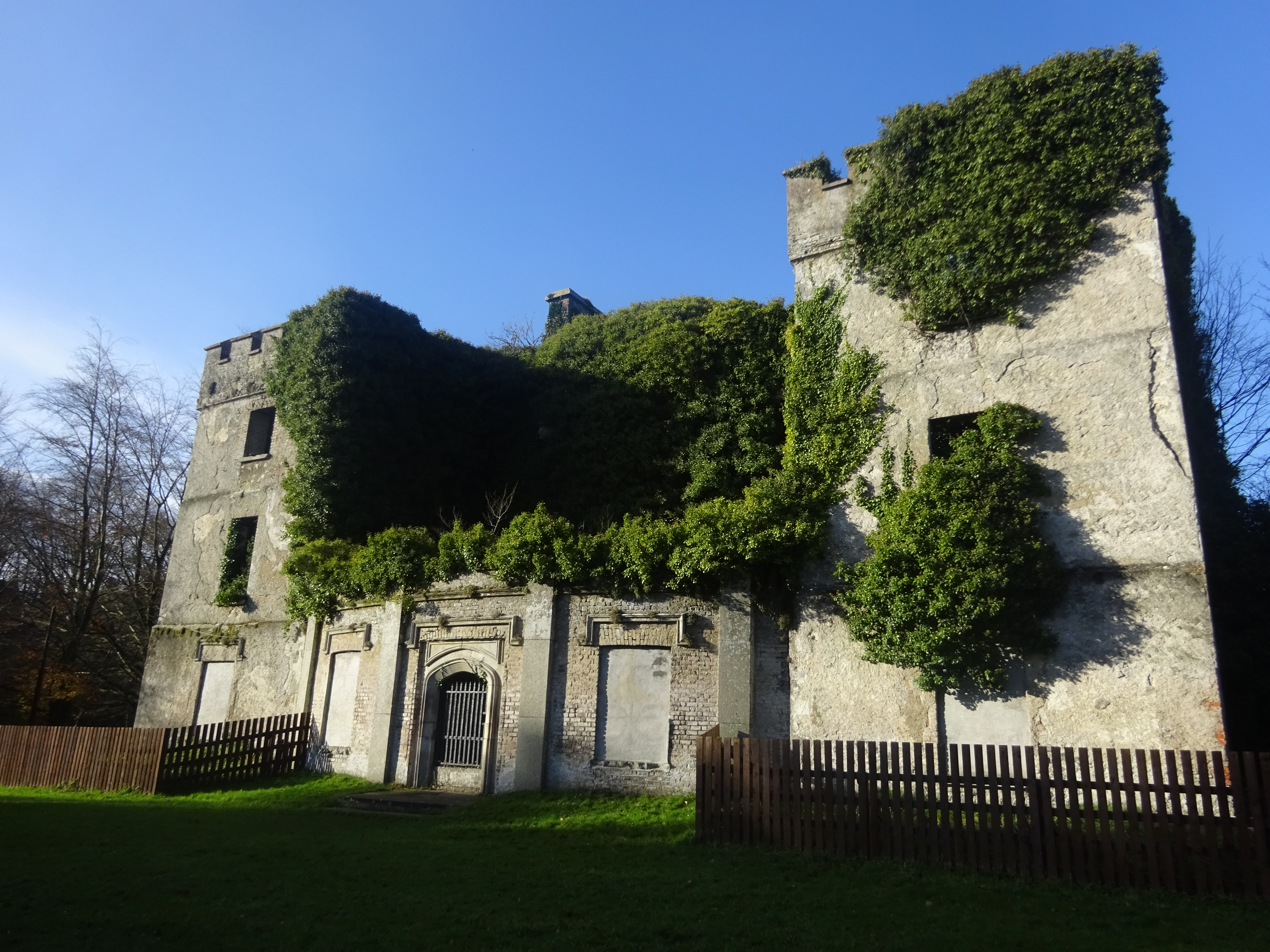
Donadea Castle

Donadea Forest Park was opened in 1981 and is managed by Coillte. The Park comprises approximately 2.43 km^{2} (600 acres) of mixed woodland. It was part of the old Aylmer family estate. The last of the Aylmers, Miss Caroline died in 1935 leaving the property to the Church of Ireland, who in turn sold it to the State. There are many historical features including the remains of the castle, walled gardens, church, tower, ice house, boat house and Lime Tree Avenue. There is also a 2.3 ha (5.7 acres) lake with ducks and other birds and a wonderful display of water-lilies in the summer. Walled streams form part of the drainage of the park.

There are a number of different walks through the forest, including the 5 km Aylmer loop, the lake walk (wheelchair accessible) and a nature trail with stops. There is a small café in the park. The park is a designated National Heritage Area.

There is a "9/11" Memorial at Donadea. The memorial was inspired by the memory of Sean Tallon, a young fire fighter, whose family had emigrated from Donadea in the early 20th century.
