= Battle of Hanna =

1916 WWI Ottoman victory in Mesopotamia

First Battle of Hanna
- Part of the Mesopotamian campaign of World War I
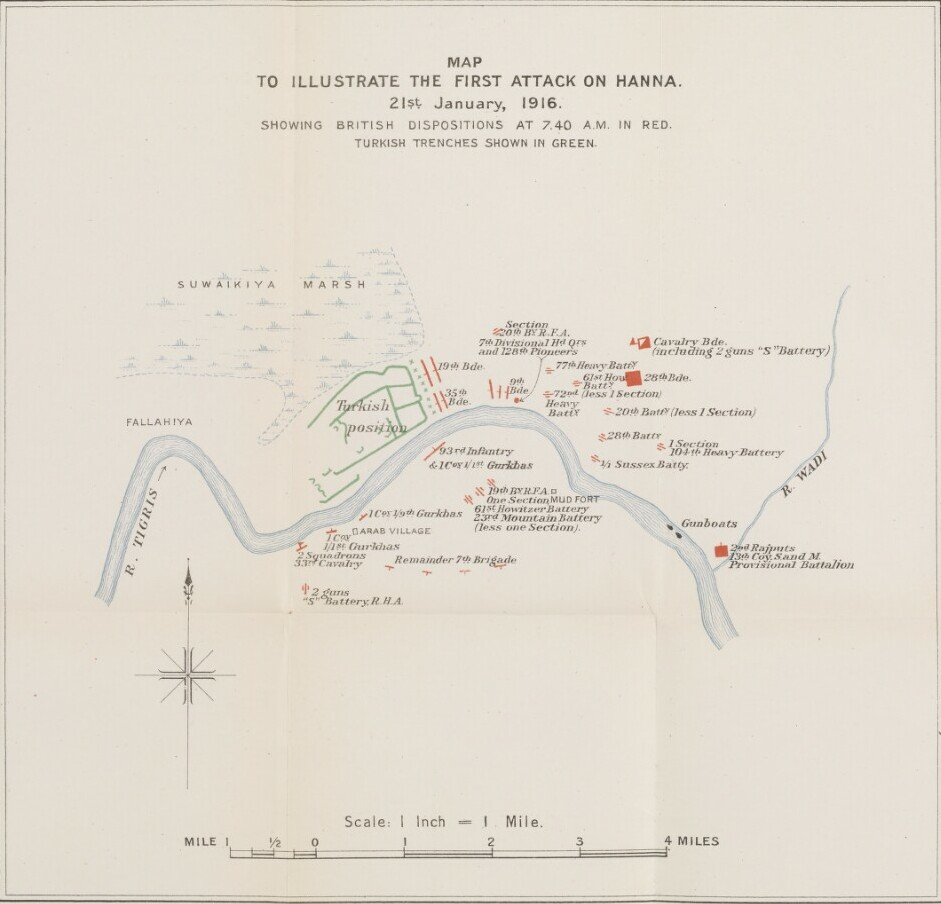
- A 1924 British map showing the first attack on Hanna.
Date	21 January 1916
Location	Hanna defile, Ottoman Iraq 32.6458795°N 46.0526276°E
Result	Ottoman victory

Belligerents
United Kingdom and Empire: India	Ottoman Empire: German Empire (military commanders)

Commanders and leaders
(United Kingdom of Great Britain and Ireland) Fenton Aylmer	(Ottoman Empire) Halil Pasha (German Empire) Colmar Freiherr von der Goltz

Strength
10,000 men (remnants of 2 divisions)	30,000 men

Casualties and losses
2,741 casualties	503 casualties
- Location within Iraq

The First Battle of Hanna (Turkish: Felahiye Muharebesi) was a World War I battle fought on the Mesopotamian front on 21 January 1916 between the Ottoman Army and Anglo-Indian forces.

== Prelude ==
After the Ottoman Empire's entry into the First World War, Britain dispatched Indian Expeditionary Force D to seize control of the Shatt al Arab and the port of Basra in order to safeguard British oil interests in the Persian Gulf. Eventually, the Anglo-Indian force's mission evolved into the capture of Baghdad. However, despite victories at Qurna, Nasiryeh, and Es Sinn, the primary offensive component of I.E.F. "D", the 6th (Poona) Division withdrew southwards after the Battle of Ctesiphon. The Ottoman forces in the region, reinforced and emboldened by the withdrawal from the gates of Baghdad, pursued the Anglo-Indian force to the town of Kut-al-Amara. Strategically situated at the confluence of the Shatt al-Hayy and the Tigris River, the commander of the Poona Division decided to defend the town.

On 15 December 1915, Ottoman troops had surrounded the Anglo-Indian force of about 10,000 men at the town of Kut-al-Amara. The British commander Major General Charles Townshend called for help, and the commander of the Mesopotamian theatre General Sir John Nixon began assembling a force of 19,000 men to relieve the besieged forces. This relief force, designated as the Tigris Corps, initially consisted of 2 divisions: 3rd (Lahore) Division and 7th (Meerut) Division, as well other units available in the region.

This relief force, commanded by Lieutenant General Fenton Aylmer, suffered two setbacks during its initial January 1916 offensive (see the Battle of Wadi). After these defeats, the relief force (now reduced to around 10,000 men) was ordered once again to attempt to break through the Ottoman lines and continued its movement up the Tigris until it encountered 30,000 men of the Ottoman Sixth Army, under the command of Khalil Pasha, at the Hanna defile, 30 miles downriver of Kut-al-Amara.

== Battle ==
After a short bombardment on 20 and 21 January 1916, the 7th Division charged the Ottoman lines. In an advance across 600 yards of flooded no-man's land, the British sustained 2,700 casualties. The well-prepared Ottoman positions, notably the well-sited machinegun nests, forced them to abandon the assault and withdraw the relief force to the base of Ali Gharbi.

== Aftermath ==
Medical care was practically nonexistent, and the night after the attack saw freezing temperatures. Many British wounded suffered unnecessarily, and morale plummeted. The besieged garrison in Kut-al-Amara could hear the distant sound of the fighting relief force, and when it remained distant, morale there suffered as well.

Following the battle, on the morning of 22 January, the Turkish troops agreed to a six-hour truce requested by the British, to retrieve the dead and wounded. Once the truce had been confirmed, several Arab soldiers ran out from the Turkish lines to pillage the bodies of the dead and wounded, until Turkish troops, witnessing the lootings from their lines, intervened.

Despite two more relief attempts, the garrison at Kut-al-Amara was forced to surrender to the Ottoman forces on 29 April 1916 (see Siege of Kut).
