= Isabella Eleanor Aylmer =

British novelist and poet

- Born: 1840; Bellshill
- Died: 27 December 1908
- Spouse: Fenton John Aylmer
- Children: 4, including Sir Fenton Aylmer, 13th Baronet

Isabella Eleanor Darling Aylmer (1840 – 27 December 1908) was a British novelist and poet who published under the names I. D. Fenton and Isabella D. Fenton.

Isabella Eleanor Darling was born in 1840 in Bellshill, Northumberland, the daughter of George Darling. In 1857, she married Captain Fenton John Aylmer, son of Sir Arthur Percy Aylmer, 11th Baronet and a Crimean War veteran. They had four children, including future Victoria Cross recipient Sir Fenton Aylmer, 13th Baronet, before he died in 1862.

Her novel Adventures of Mrs. Colonel Somerset in Caffraria, During the War (1858) is about a woman, Helen Somerset, who is shipwrecked off southern Africa and is held captive by the Xhosa, but later chooses to remain with them. The novel is sympathetic to the Xhosa and critical of colonialism.

Her novel Distant Homes: Or the Graham Family in New Zealand (1862) has been described as "the second New Zealand novel", after Taranaki: A Tale of the War (1861) by Henry Butler Stoney. Aylmer, however, never visited New Zealand, relying on correspondence with another Isabella Aylmer, the wife of Rev. William Joseph Aylmer, the first minister in Akaroa. The novel has been derided by critics as cliched, sentimental, inaccurate, and implausible.

Aylmer died on 27 December 1908.

== Bibliography ==
- Adventures of Mrs. Colonel Somerset in Caffraria, During the War. 1 vol. London: Hope, 1858.
- Memoirs of a Lady in Waiting. 2 vol. London: Saunders and Otley, 1860.
- Distant Homes: Or the Graham Family in New Zealand, 1862.
- Alec Tomlin: or, Choose Wisely. 1 vol. London: Frederick Warne, 1873.
