= Gerald Aylmer (disambiguation) =

Gerald Aylmer (1926–2000) was an English historian.

Gerald Aylmer may also refer to:

- Gerald Aylmer (judge), (c. 1500–1559), Irish judge
- Sir Gerald Aylmer, 1st Baronet (1548–1634) of the Aylmer baronets
- Sir Gerald Aylmer, 5th Baronet (1703–1737) of the Aylmer baronets
- Sir Gerald Aylmer, 8th Baronet (1798–1878) of the Aylmer baronets
- Sir Gerald Aylmer, 9th Baronet (1830–1883) of the Aylmer baronets
- Sir Gerald Aylmer, 14th Baronet (1869–1939) of the Aylmer baronets

== See also ==
- Aylmer (surname)
