= Patrick Hehir =

British military surgeon

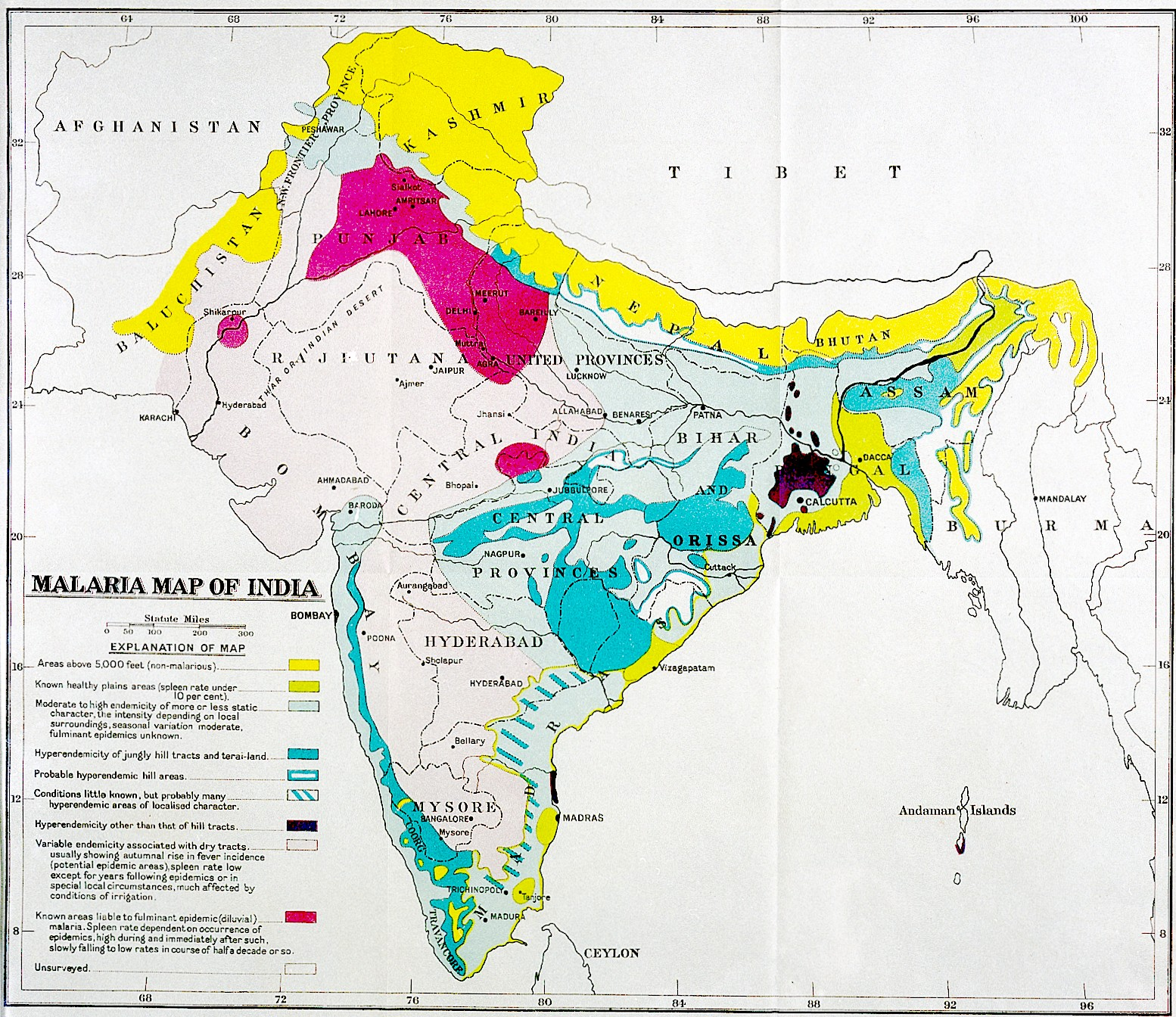
Sir Patrick Hehir’s Malaria Map of India

Major-General Sir Patrick Hehir KCIE CB CMG FRSE FRCPE FRCSE (17 May 1859 – 1 May 1937) was a British military surgeon. He served in the Indian Medical Service (IMS) as the Principal Medical Officer to the army of the Nizam of Hyderabad. During the 148 day Siege of Kut he suffered alongside the troops and wrote extensively on the topic of prolonged starvation. He also wrote extensively on medical history in India.

== Life ==
Hehir was born on 17 May 1859, the son of Robert Martin Hehir of Ennis in County Clare, Ireland. He studied at Calcutta University, qualified as a doctor in Brussels's, became a Licentiate of the Royal College of Surgeons and the Royal College of Physicians at the University of Edinburgh, obtained a Diploma in Public Health from the University of Cambridge and then received a Diploma in Tropical Medicine from the University of Liverpool.

In 1892 he was a member of the Hyderabad Chloroform Commission which examined the safe use of chloroform anaesthesia. In 1893 he was elected a Fellow of the Royal Society of Edinburgh. His proposers were Patrick Doyle, Sir Joseph Fayrer, Sir Byrom Bramwell and Thomas Annandale.

During his years in India he appears to have become an opium user and wrote against measures to ban it. Back in Britain, when this was made illegal in 1894, he wrote he rued not being addicted to legal activities.

He saw active service in many military campaigns and was highly decorated. In the First World War he served in Mesopotamia as the Principal Medical Officer. He was present at the Battle of Ctesiphon and the ill-fated Siege of Kut under General Charles Townshend. He was captured when the garrison surrendered on 29 April 1916 but was released 25 September 1916. He went on to see service in Waziristan in 1917 and lastly Afghanistan (1919).

In 1927 Hehir wrote on malaria in India. Hehir retired 9 December 1919 and died in 1937.

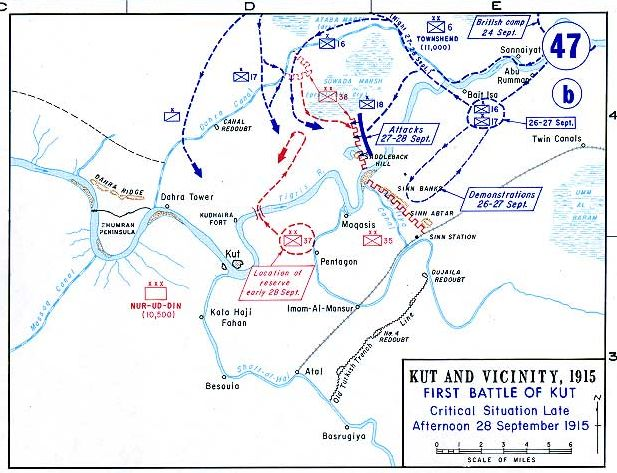
The Siege of Kut, 1915.

== Honours ==
See

- Companion of the Order of the Bath (CB)
- Companion of the Order of St Michael and St George (CMG)
- Knight Commander of Order of the Indian Empire (KCIE)
- Knight of Grace of the Order of St John of Jerusalem
- Campaign Medal, Burma 1886–1887
- Campaign Medal, North-West Frontier 1897–1898
- Campaign Medal, North-West Frontier 1908, Afghanistan NWF 1919

== Publications ==
- Outlines of Medical Jurisprudence for India (1892)
- The Medical Profession in India (1923)
- Malaria in India (1927)

== Family ==
In 1908 he married Dora Lloyd, granddaughter of Edward Lloyd who founded The Daily Chronicle, and they had a daughter.
