= William Palmer, 2nd Earl of Selborne =

British politician and colonial administrator (1859–1942)

The Right Honourable The Earl of Selborne KG GCMG PC
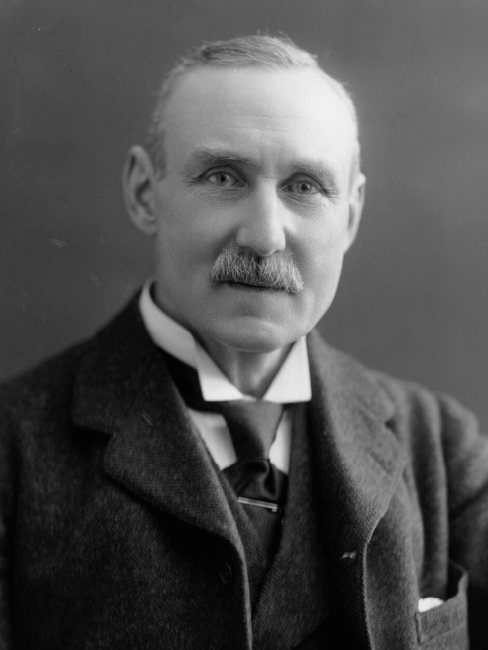
- Selborne in 1919

First Lord of the Admiralty
- In office 12 November 1900 – 27 March 1905
- Monarchs: Queen Victoria; Edward VII
- Prime Minister: Robert Gascoyne-Cecil, 3rd Marquess of Salisbury
- Preceded by: George Goschen
- Succeeded by: Frederick Campbell, 3rd Earl Cawdor

2nd High Commissioner for Southern Africa
- In office May 1905 – May 1910
- Monarch: Edward VII
- Preceded by: Alfred Milner, 1st Viscount Milner
- Succeeded by: Herbert Gladstone, 1st Viscount Gladstone

President of the Board of Agriculture
- In office 25 May 1915 – 11 July 1916
- Monarch: George V
- Prime Minister: H. H. Asquith
- Preceded by: Auberon Herbert, 9th Baron Lucas of Crudwell
- Succeeded by: David Lindsay, 27th Earl of Crawford

Personal details
- Born: 17 October 1859 London, Middlesex, United Kingdom
- Died: 26 February 1942 (aged 82) London, United Kingdom
- Party: Liberal; Liberal Unionist; Conservative
- Spouse: Lady Maud Gascoyne-Cecil (m. 1883)
- Children: Mabel Grey, Countess Grey; Roundell Palmer, 3rd Earl of Selborne; The Hon. Robert Palmer; The Hon. Lewis Palmer
- Parent(s): Roundell Palmer, 1st Earl of Selborne; Lady Laura Waldegrave
- Education: University College, Oxford

William Waldegrave Palmer, 2nd Earl of Selborne (17 October 1859 – 26 February 1942), styled Viscount Wolmer between 1882 and 1895, was a British politician and colonial administrator, who served as High Commissioner for Southern Africa.

== Background and education ==
Selborne was the son of Lord Chancellor Roundell Palmer, 1st Earl of Selborne, and Lady Laura, daughter of Vice-Admiral William Waldegrave, 8th Earl Waldegrave. He was educated at Temple Grove School, Winchester College and University College, Oxford, where he took a first class degree in history.

He was commissioned as a Second lieutenant in the part-time 3rd (Hampshire Militia) Battalion, Hampshire Regiment on 21 May 1879, promoted to Lieutenant on 23 March 1881, Captain on 29 July 1885, and to the command as a Lieutenant-Colonel on 22 April 1899. At the end of his term of command he was appointed Honorary Colonel of the battalion on 23 July 1904, a position that he retained until his death, by which time he was the only remaining officer of the battalion, which had never been re-embodied after World War I.

== Political career ==
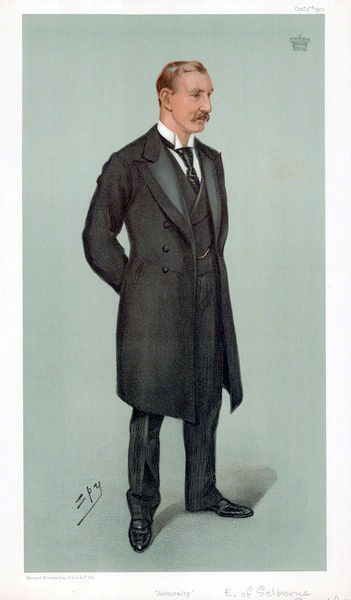
The Earl of Selborne by Leslie Ward, 1901

=== 1882–1910 ===
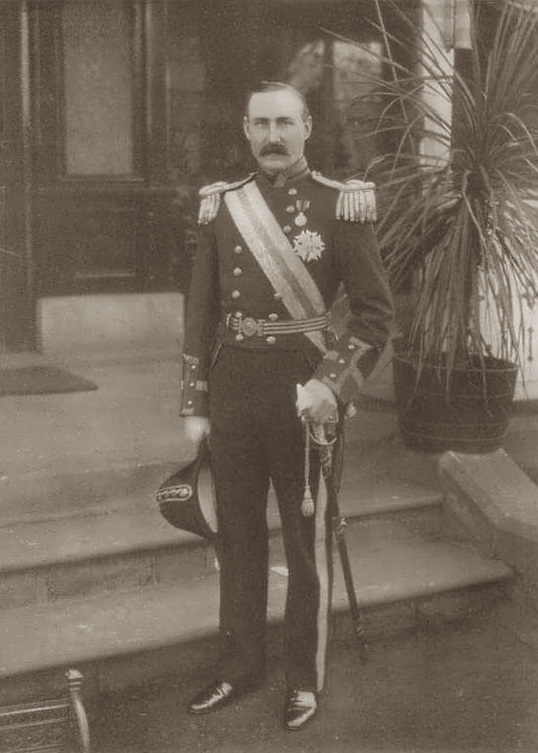
The Earl of Selborne on the day he took the oath as High Commissioner and Governor of South Africa, 1905

As Viscount Wolmer, he was assistant private secretary to the Chancellor of the Exchequer, Hugh Childers, from 1882 to 1885, when he was elected Liberal Member of Parliament for Petersfield. Like his father, he became a Liberal Unionist in 1886 when William Ewart Gladstone proposed Irish Home Rule. He retained his seat till 1892, when he was elected for Edinburgh West. Despite succeeding to the Earldom on his father's death, on 13 May 1895 he attempted to sit as before in the Commons, arguing that, although he was now a Peer, he had not requested a writ of summons to the Lords. After some debate, on 21 May the Commons moved a by-election writ.

After the 1895 general election, Selborne, now sitting in the Lords, was appointed Under-Secretary of State for the Colonies by his father-in-law Lord Salisbury, where he became junior to the Colonial Secretary Joseph Chamberlain. During the difficult period before the outbreak of the Second Boer War he progressed rapidly. In November 1900, Selborne was sworn of the Privy Council and made First Lord of the Admiralty under Salisbury, with a seat in the cabinet, an office he retained when Arthur Balfour became Prime Minister in 1902. In 1905 he succeeded Lord Milner as High Commissioner for Southern Africa and governor of the Transvaal and Orange River colonies. He assumed office at Pretoria in May of that year. He had gone out with the intention of guiding the destinies of South Africa during a period when the ex-Boer republics would be in a transitional state between crown colony government and self-government, and letters patent were issued granting the Transvaal representative institutions.

But the Liberal Party came into office in Britain the following December, before the new constitution had been established, and, the decision was now taken to give both the Transvaal and Orange River colonies self-government without delay. Lord Selborne accepted the changed situation, and the experiment proved successful, from the perspective of avoiding a further war with the Boers. But the new constitution allowed the franchise only to those of European descent, and Selborne pushed through policies to keep out non-white immigrants, stating that Indians were not wanted because they didn’t know how to use arms.

He ceased to be governor of the Orange River Colony on its assumption of Responsible government in June 1907, but retained his other posts until May 1910, retiring on the eve of the establishment of the Union of South Africa.

The despatch, dated 7 January 1907 and known as the Selborne Memorandum, in which he reviewed the situation in its economic and political aspects, was a comprehensive statement of the dangers inherent in the existing system and of the advantages likely to attend union. The document had in fact been compiled by Lionel Curtis and other members of Milner's Kindergarten. The force of its appeal had a marked influence on the course of events, while the loyalty with which Lord Selborne co-operated with the Botha administration was an additional factor in reconciling the Dutch and British communities.

=== 1910–1942 ===
He returned to England with his reputation, according to the 1911 Encyclopædia Britannica, "as a statesman enhanced by the respect of all parties, and with a practical experience, second only to that of Lord Milner, of British imperialism in successful operation." His experience made him a valuable ally in the movement among the Unionist party at home for Tariff Reform and Imperial Preference, to which he could now give his full support.

In 1915 Selborne returned to government during the First World War when he became President of the Board of Agriculture in the war time coalition of Liberal prime minister H. H. Asquith. He resigned from Cabinet in June 1916 because of David Lloyd George's handling of the botched Home Rule negotiations (May–July) and the Prime Minister's failure to bring Lloyd George to task while the negotiations were still in progress. Selborne did not hold high political office again. Selborne chaired the Selborne Committee on Church and State from 1914 to 1916.

Apart from his political career Selborne served as Master of the Worshipful Company of Mercers in 1910 and 1933, as his father had done before him, in 1875. In 1916, he was elected a member of the Society for Psychical Research. He was also Warden (chairman of the governors) of Winchester College between 1920 and 1925 and High Steward of Winchester between 1929 and 1942. In 1939, after the failure of the Munich Agreement and appeasement in general to halt Nazi Germany's expansionism in Continental Europe, he wrote a letter to The Daily Telegraph advocating for Winston Churchill to be admitted into the National Government Cabinet. He was made a Knight Companion of the Garter in 1909.

== Family ==
Lord Selborne married Lady Maud Cecil, elder daughter of future Prime Minister Robert Cecil, 3rd Marquess of Salisbury, in 1883. A Suiderberg, Pretoria district, Lady Selborne, is named after her.

They had three sons and one daughter.

- Lady Mabel Laura Georgiana Palmer (6 October 1884 – 15 July 1958); married Charles Grey, 5th Earl Grey, and had two daughters.
- Roundell Cecil Palmer, 3rd Earl of Selborne (15 April 1887 – 3 September 1971); married, firstly, the Hon. Grace Ridley in 1910; had issue. Married, secondly, Valerie Irene Josephine Margaret de Thomka de Thomkahaza in 1966; no issue.
- The Hon. Robert Stafford Arthur Palmer (26 September 1888 – 21 January 1916)
- The Hon. William Jocelyn Lewis Palmer (15 September 1894 – 6 June 1971); married the Hon. Dorothy Cicely Sybil Loder, daughter of Gerald Loder, 1st Baron Wakehurst in 1922 and had two children.

His second son, the Hon. Robert Palmer, was a captain in the Hampshire Regiment and was killed on active service in Mesopotamia in 1916. His daughter was Lady Mabel Laura Georgiana Palmer, who became Countess Grey as the wife of Charles Grey, 5th Earl Grey. His letters home were privately published as Letters from Mesopotamia. Lord Selborne died in February 1942, aged 82, and was succeeded by his eldest son, Roundell, Viscount Wolmer, who had already the previous year been summoned to the House of Lords by writ of acceleration in his father's junior title of Baron Selborne. The Countess of Selborne died in April 1950.

== Arms ==
Coat of arms of William Palmer, 2nd Earl of Selborne
Crest A mount vert, thereon a greyhound sejant sable, collared or, charged on the shoulder with a trefoil slipped argent. Escutcheon Argent, two bars sable, charged with three trefoils slipped of the field; in chief a greyhound courant of the second, collared or. Supporters On either side a greyhound sable, collared or, and charged on the shoulder with a trefoil slipped argent. Motto Palma Virtuti (The palm is for virtue) Orders Most Noble Order of the Garter (Knight Companion – KG)

Parliament of the United Kingdom
Preceded by William Nicholson	Member of Parliament for Petersfield; 1885–1892	Succeeded by William Wickham
Preceded by Thomas Buchanan	Member of Parliament for Edinburgh West; 1892–1895	Succeeded by Lewis McIver
Political offices
Preceded by Sydney Buxton	Under-Secretary of State for the Colonies; 1895–1900	Succeeded by The Earl of Onslow
Preceded by George Goschen	First Lord of the Admiralty; 1900–1905	Succeeded by The Earl Cawdor
Preceded by The Lord Lucas of Crudwell	President of the Board of Agriculture; 1915–1916	Succeeded by The Earl of Crawford
Government offices
Preceded by The Viscount Milner	High Commissioner for Southern Africa; 1905–1910	Succeeded by The Viscount Gladstone
Preceded by The Viscount Milner	Governor of the Transvaal; 1905–1910	Succeeded by The Viscount Gladstone as Governor-General of South Africa
Preceded by The Viscount Milner	Governor of the Orange River Colony; 1905–1907	Succeeded by Sir Hamilton Goold-Adams
Peerage of the United Kingdom
Preceded by Roundell Palmer	Earl of Selborne; 1895–1942	Succeeded by Roundell Palmer
Preceded by Roundell Palmer	Baron Selborne (descended by acceleration); 1895–1940	Succeeded by Roundell Palmer
