= Siege of Kut =

WWI siege

- Part of the Mesopotamian campaign of World War I
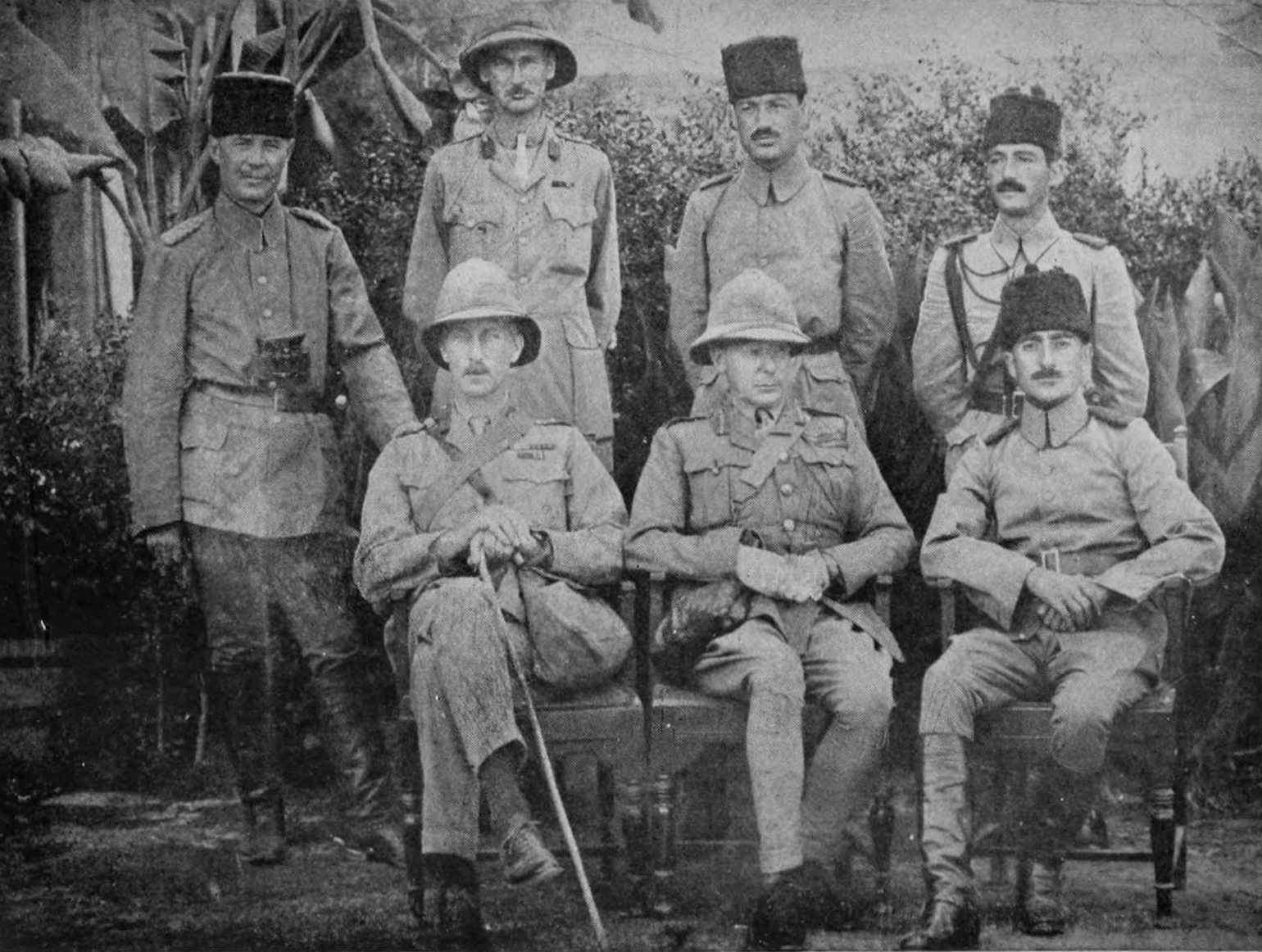
- Charles Townshend and Halil Pasha after the fall of Kut
Date	7 December 1915 – 29 April 1916
Location	Kut-al-Amara, Baghdad Vilayet 32°30′20″N 45°49′29″E
Result	Ottoman victory

Belligerents
United Kingdom	Ottoman Empire

Commanders and leaders
(United Kingdom) Charles Townshend (surrendered) (United Kingdom) H. C. Armstrong (surrendered)	(Ottoman Empire) Nureddin Pasha (Ottoman Empire) Halil Pasha (Ottoman Empire) Kazim Pasha (Ottoman Empire) Ali İhsan Pasha (German Empire) C.F. von der Goltz #

Strength
25,000–45,000, including 13,000+ besieged in Kut	25,000–80,000

Casualties and losses
Besieged forces: 13,164 captured including 6 generals Relief operations: 30,000 dead or wounded	10,000 dead or wounded
- Location within Iraq Siege of Kut (Middle East)

The siege of Kut Al Amara (7 December 1915 – 29 April 1916), also known as the first battle of Kut, was the besieging of an 8,000-strong British Indian Army garrison in the town of Kut, 160 km (100 mi) south of Baghdad, by the Ottoman Army. In 1915, its population was around 6,500. Following the surrender of the garrison on 29 April 1916, the survivors of the siege were marched to imprisonment at Aleppo, during which many died. Historian Christopher Catherwood has called the siege "the worst defeat of the Allies in World War I". Ten months later, the British Indian Army, consisting almost entirely of newly recruited troops from Western India, conquered Kut, Baghdad and other regions in between in the fall of Baghdad.

== Prelude ==
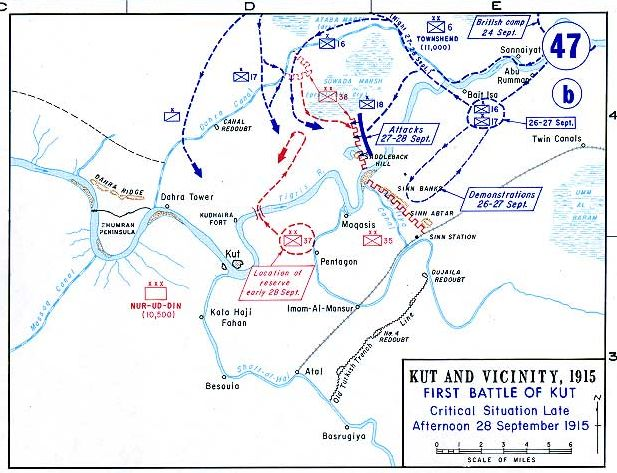
Situation at Kut on 28 September 1915

The 6th (Poona) Division of the Indian Army, under Major-General Charles Townshend, had fallen back to the town of Kut after retreating from Ctesiphon. The British Empire forces arrived at Kut around 3 December 1915. They had suffered significant losses, numbering only 11,000 soldiers (plus cavalry). General Townshend chose to stay and hold the position at Kut instead of continuing the march downriver towards Basra. Contained within a long river loop, Kut offered a good defensive position although supply lines from distant Basra were stretched.

== The siege ==
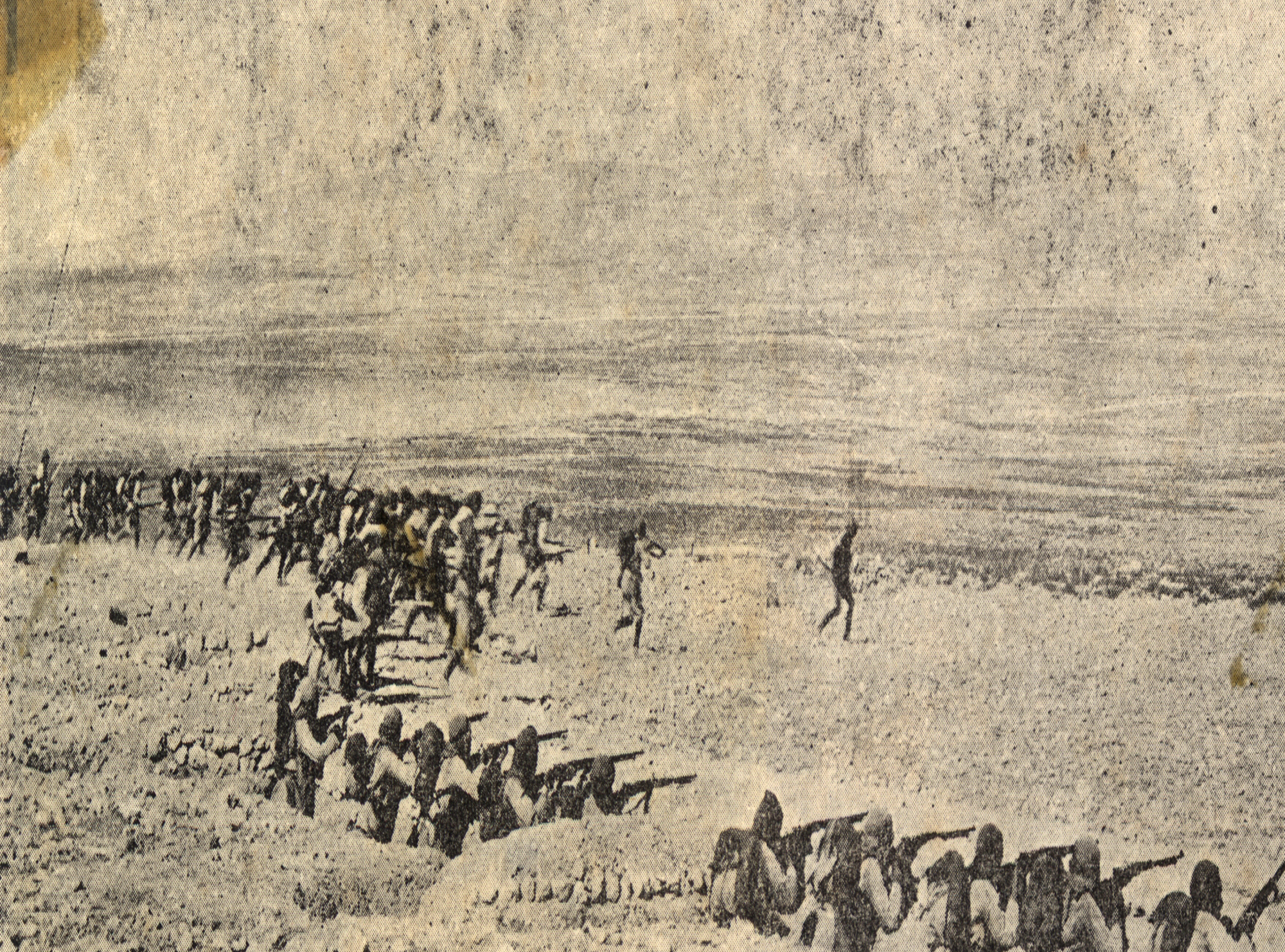
The siege by Ottoman 6th Army forces

The pursuing Ottoman forces under Halil Pasha arrived on 7 December 1915. Once it became clear the Ottomans had enough forces to lay siege to Kut, Townshend ordered his cavalry to escape south, which it did, led by Lieut. Colonel Gerard Leachman. The Ottoman forces numbered around 11,000 men and were increasing steadily with additional reinforcements arriving constantly. They were commanded by the respected but elderly German general and military historian Baron von der Goltz. Goltz knew the Ottoman army well, as he had spent 12 years working on modernizing it, from 1883 to 1895. After three attacks in December, Goltz directed the building of siege fortifications facing Kut. He prepared for an attack from Basra, using the Tigris River, by building defensive positions further down the river designed to cut off a river-borne relief. The Ottoman XVIII Corps that consisted of the 45th and 51st divisions was assigned to besiege Kut while the XIII Corps that consisted of the 35th and 52nd divisions was assigned down the Tigris river to block any relief force coming up from Basra.

After a month of siege, Townshend wanted to break out and withdraw southwards but his commander, General Sir John Nixon saw value in tying down the Ottoman forces in a siege. Nixon had ordered transports from London, but none had arrived. The War Office was in the process of reorganizing military command; previously the orders had come from the Viceroy and India Office.

However, when Townshend—inaccurately—reported that only one month of food remained, a rescue force was hastily raised. It is not clear why Townshend reported he only had enough food for one month when he actually had food for more than four months (although at a reduced level), but Townshend would not attempt an infantry retreat unprotected through hostile tribal lands without river transport. Nixon had ordered this with reinforcements, commanded by his son, but by December they were still only in the Suez Canal. The confusing communications would prove to be a critical delay.

Medical facilities in Kut were headed by Major General Patrick Hehir.

=== Relief expeditions ===
The first relief expedition comprised some 19,000 men under Lieutenant-General Aylmer and it headed up the river from Ali Gharbi in January 1916.

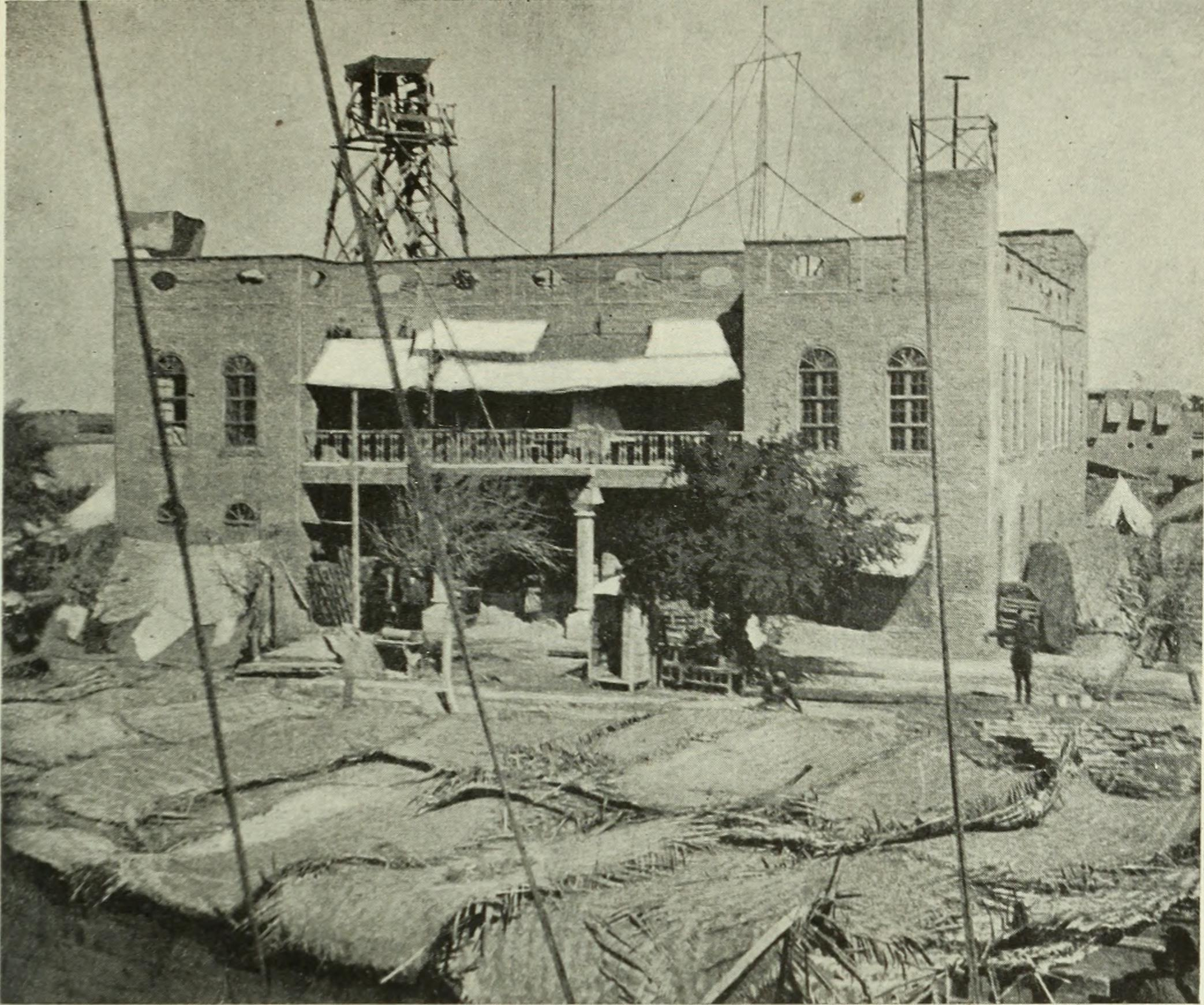
The British Headquarters in Kut

==== Battle of Sheikh Sa'ad ====
The first attempt to relieve Kut (the Battle of Sheikh Sa'ad) came on 6 January by troops under the command of Major-General George Younghusband. Troops under Lieut. Gen. Aylmer's command joined the British forces with two brigades the next day following which Aylmer took over the command. Part of the cause of delay was the debate in Cabinet over whether one division would be an adequate force or whether two divisions should be sent. Deliberations were painfully slow. The ageing General Maurice insisted on being informed at every turn as the evidence came into the Committee of Imperial Defence; which was further complicated by a restructuring involving the setup of a new sub-committee system and transfer of military responsibilities. At least three urgent memoranda were sent from General Nixon demanding transports to evacuate Townshend's division. By Christmas his health had broken down, and he requested a return to Bombay.

Nixon's replacements with additional staff as a mandatory requirement moved forward from Ali Al Gharbi towards Sheikh Sa'ad along both banks of the Tigris. Younghusband's column made contact with the Ottomans on the morning of 6 January 5.6 km (3 1/2 mi) east of Sheikh Sa'ad. British efforts to defeat the Ottomans were unsuccessful.

The following day, on 7 January, Aylmer arrived with the main body of his forces and ordered a general attack. Younghusband led the attack on the left bank and Major-General Kemball took the right. After heavy fighting all day, Kemball's troops had overrun Ottoman trenches on the right bank, taking prisoners and capturing two guns. However, the Ottoman left bank held firm and they carried out supporting manoeuvres from the north.

After little change on 8 January, renewed British attacks on 9 January resulted in the Ottomans retiring from Sheikh Sa'ad. Over the following two days the Ottomans were followed by Aylmer's force but heavy rains made the roads virtually impassable.

==== Battle of Wadi ====
The Ottomans retreated for about 16 km (10 mi) from Sheikh Sa'ad to a tributary of the Tigris on the left bank known by the Arabic toponym simply as the Wadi (meaning "the river valley"). The Ottomans made their camp beyond the Wadi and on the other side of the Tigris opposite the Wadi.

On 13 January, Aylmer attacked the Ottoman Wadi position on the left bank with all of his forces. After putting up a stiff resistance, the Ottomans retreated 8 km (5 mi) to the west and they were followed by Aylmer's troops.

==== Battle of Hanna ====
The Ottomans then made their camp upstream of the Wadi at the Hanna defile, a narrow strip of dry land between the Tigris and the Suwaikiya Marshes. British losses at the Battle of Hanna amounted to 2,700 killed and wounded, which was disastrous for the garrison in Kut.

==== Siege ====
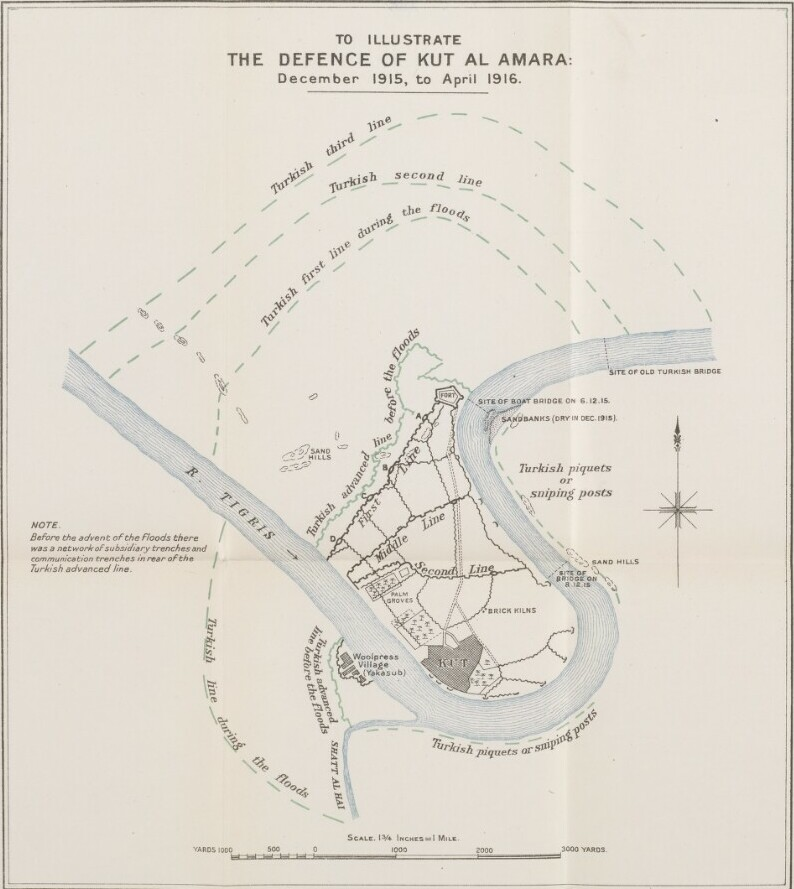
A 1924 map of the defense of Kut during the siege

As the siege continued, supplies started to run out for the besieged. Sergeant Munn reported: "About half-way through February the rations were sadly diminishing. Tobacco was first out, and we were smoking anything that would smoke, and green leaves (dried over a fire), tea leaves and sawdust mixed, ginger cut into small lumps. Tea ran out and we had ginger instead (ginger crushed and steeped in boiling water). Milk and sugar had given out long ago, likewise beef and mutton and all the bully was gone with the exception of two days' emergency rations which kept back until the very last". Dysentery and scurvy became common.

At the beginning of March 1916, the Ottomans used their Krupp artillery to open a heavy bombardment of Kut, which destroyed much of the town. At the same time, three German aircraft bombed Kut, though the damage inflicted was only slight as compared to the artillery bombardment. At the time, the Ottomans were seen unloading metal cylinders from a barge in the Tigris, which were assumed to contain chemical weapons from Germany. Townshend in his diary called chemical warfare "a cowardly barbarism worthy of Chinese pirates". As both the garrison and population of Kut began to starve while the Ottoman guns continued to blast Kut, Townshend sent out a series of messages on the radio asking for a promotion from major-general to lieutenant-general on the account of his success advancing the Tigris in 1915, requests that reflected badly on him.

==== Later efforts ====
At this point, Khalil Pasha (the Ottoman commander of the whole region) came to the battle, bringing with him a further 20,000 to 30,000 reinforcements.

Following the defeat of Aylmer's expedition, General Nixon was replaced as supreme commander by Percy Lake on 19 January. More forces were sent to bolster Aylmer's troops. He tried again, attacking the Dujaila redoubt on 8 March. This attack failed, at a cost of 4,000 men. General Aylmer was dismissed and replaced with General George Gorringe on 12 March.

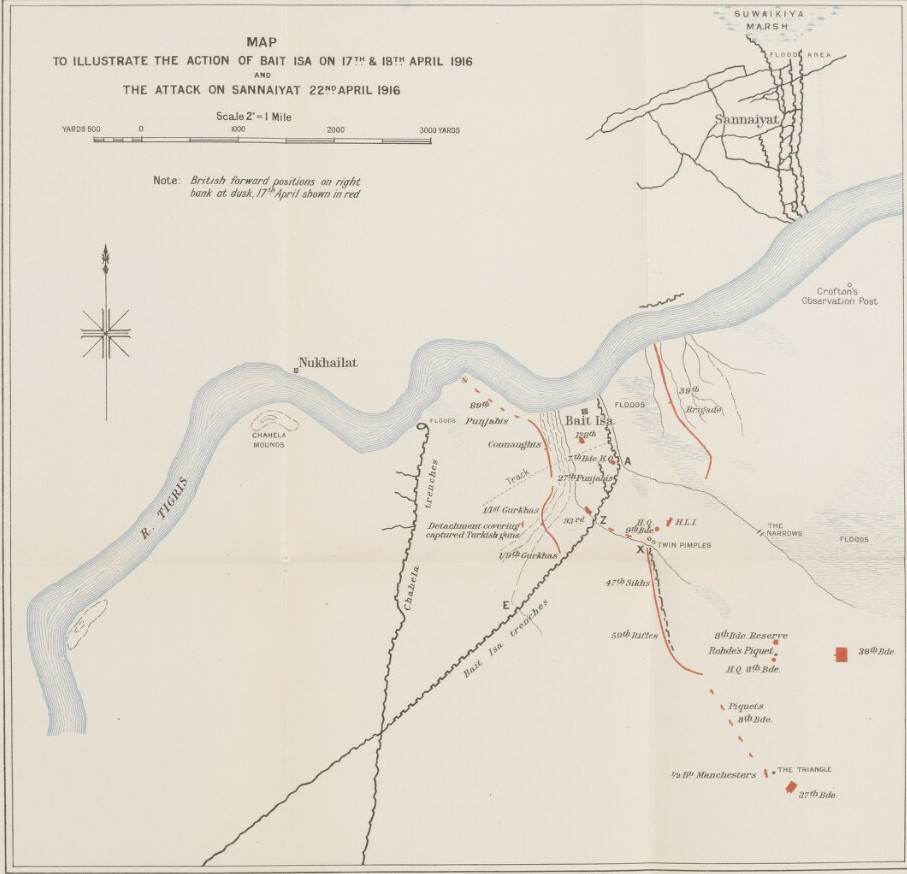
A map illustrating the action at Bait Isa and Sannaiyat published in 1924

In April, starvation within the British garrison at Kut forced Indian troops to abandon the vegetarian diet of their religion and eat horse meat.

The relief attempt by Gorringe is usually termed the first battle of Kut. The British Empire's forces numbered about 30,000 soldiers, roughly equal to the Ottomans. The battle began on 5 April and the British soon captured Fallahiya but with heavy losses, Bait Isa was taken on 17 April. The final effort was against Sannaiyat on 22 April. The Allies were unable to take Sannaiyat and suffered some 1,200 casualties in the process.

In April 1916 No. 30 Squadron of the Royal Flying Corps carried out the first air supply operation in history. Food and ammunition were dropped to the defenders of Kut, but "as often as not their parcels go into the Tigris or into the Turkish trenches!" and the food rations provided between the 11 and 29 April were only enough for three days.

All the relief efforts had failed, at a cost of around 30,000 Allied killed or wounded. Ottoman casualties are believed to have been around 10,000. The Ottomans also lost the aid of Baron von der Goltz. He died in April 1916, supposedly of typhoid about a week before the British surrendered on 29 April. After Goltz's death, no German commander took his place in Mesopotamia for the rest of the war.

=== Surrender of the British army ===
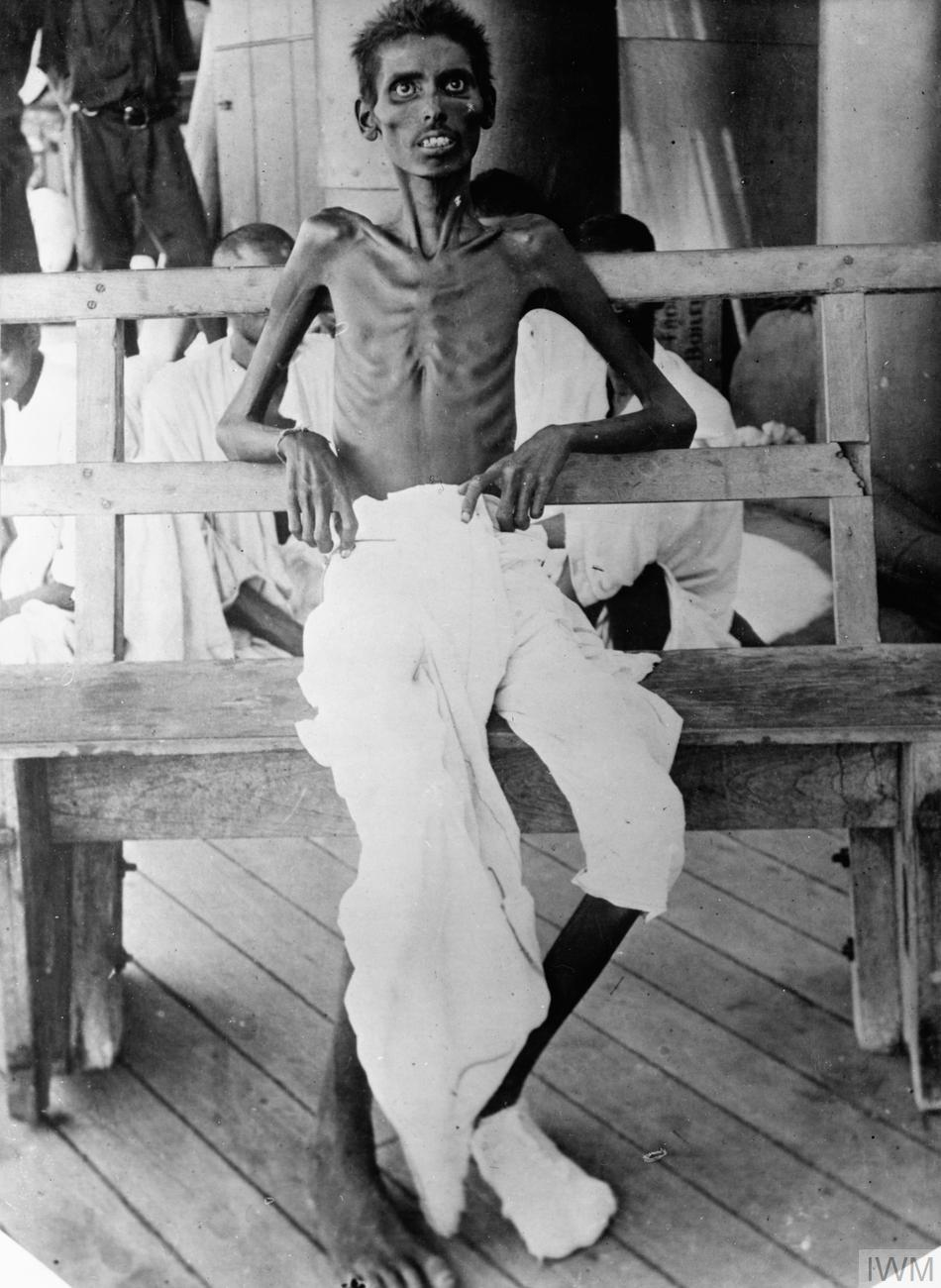
An Indian soldier after the siege of Kut

British leaders attempted to buy their troops out. Aubrey Herbert and T. E. Lawrence were part of a team of officers sent to negotiate a secret deal with the Ottomans. The British offered £2 million (equivalent to £200 million in 2024) and promised those soldiers would not fight the Ottomans again, in exchange for Townshend's troops. Enver Pasha at first pretended to negotiate in good faith, then publicized and rejected the offer as a final humiliation to the British.

The British also asked for help from the Russians. General Nikolai Baratov, with his largely Cossack force of 20,000, was in Persia at the time. Following the request he advanced towards Baghdad in April 1916, but he turned back when news of the surrender reached him.

General Townshend arranged a ceasefire on the 26th and, after failed negotiations, he simply surrendered on 29 April 1916 after a siege of 147 days. Around 13,000 Allied soldiers survived to be made prisoners. The Turkish writer İlber Ortaylı states that "Halil Pasha acted like a gentleman to the surrendering British officers" and offered "to take the POWs up towards the north in river boats in case fuel could be provided from British bases nearby." The French historian Marc Ferro suggested a different image. According to Ferro, the surrendered British and Indian forces were forced to march around the city of Baghdad while being maltreated by the Ottoman troops supervising their march.

After the surrender, the Ottomans agreed to an exchange of sick and wounded soldiers for an equal number of POWs of the Ottoman Empire that were held by the British. Around 1,500 incapacitated prisoners were exchanged. The Anglo-Indian sick and wounded were taken to hospitals by ships and barges of the Tigris River.

The men of the 6th Division suffered terribly as Ottoman prisoners. On the day of the surrender, the Ottomans handed out biscuits for the POWs. The British historian Russell Braddon wrote that after eating the biscuits "The following morning, they began to die. Frothing at the mouth, their bowels and stomachs disintegrating into a greenish slime, dehydrated and moaning, they died one after the other". The British and Indian POWs were afflicted by enteritis from contaminated biscuits.

The British historian Paul Knight wrote: "The treatment of the Kuttities was similar to those of the Allied prisoners of war taken by the Japanese, which is of course a far more familiar story to a modern audience. Whether or not there was a deliberate state policy to murder the Kuttities through overwork, underfeeding, or both, or whether murder was a by-produce of negligence, neglect and official incompetence is a moot point. It made little difference to the Kuttities. Their captivity took place against the backdrop of the Armenian massacres, which are still denied by the modern Turkish state. Again, whether or not the death of thousands of Armenians was the result of a state policy, or whether it was the by-produce of negligence, neglect and official incompetence is a moot point. It made little difference to the Armenians". One British POW, Sergeant Long, wrote about the long march from Kut to the POW camps in Anatolia: "No words can adequately describe the appalling misery of that scene. Here were men who had suffered and fought the long months of the siege, although they were gradually starved and were not fit to do a day's march, yet they were being driven across the pitiless waste under a scorching sun, herded along by a brutal and callous escort of Arab conscripts. Limping and staggering along they all finally arrived, some of them being assisted along by comrades, who themselves were in dire need of assistance". Other sources say many died en route. The Ottoman guards constantly whipped the POWs to encourage them to move faster. The Indian Muslims were able to bring themselves some protection by saying "Islami, Islami" while the Gurkhas and Sikh POWs were abused for their religions.

After reaching Mosul, the POWs entered into areas where the population was Kurdish while the desert terrain was replaced with the mountains of Anatolia. Long described the Kurds as being more kindly disposed to the POWs than the Arabs, which together the cool summer mountain air made conditions more bearable. At the Ras-el-Ain camp where Indian POWs were being held, Long described the Indians as being in a "...condition that was truly pitiful they resembled animated skeletons hung about with filthy rags. No tents or other shelter had been provided and they were living in holes in the grounds like pariah dogs".

Townshend himself was taken to the island of Heybeliada on the Sea of Marmara, to sit out the war in relative luxury. The author Norman Dixon, in his book On the Psychology of Military Incompetence, described Townshend as being "amused" by the plight of the men he had deserted, as if he had pulled off some clever trick. Dixon says Townshend was unable to understand why his friends and comrades were ultimately censorious over his behaviour.

In British Army battle honours, the siege of Kut is named as "Defence of Kut Al Amara".

== Aftermath ==
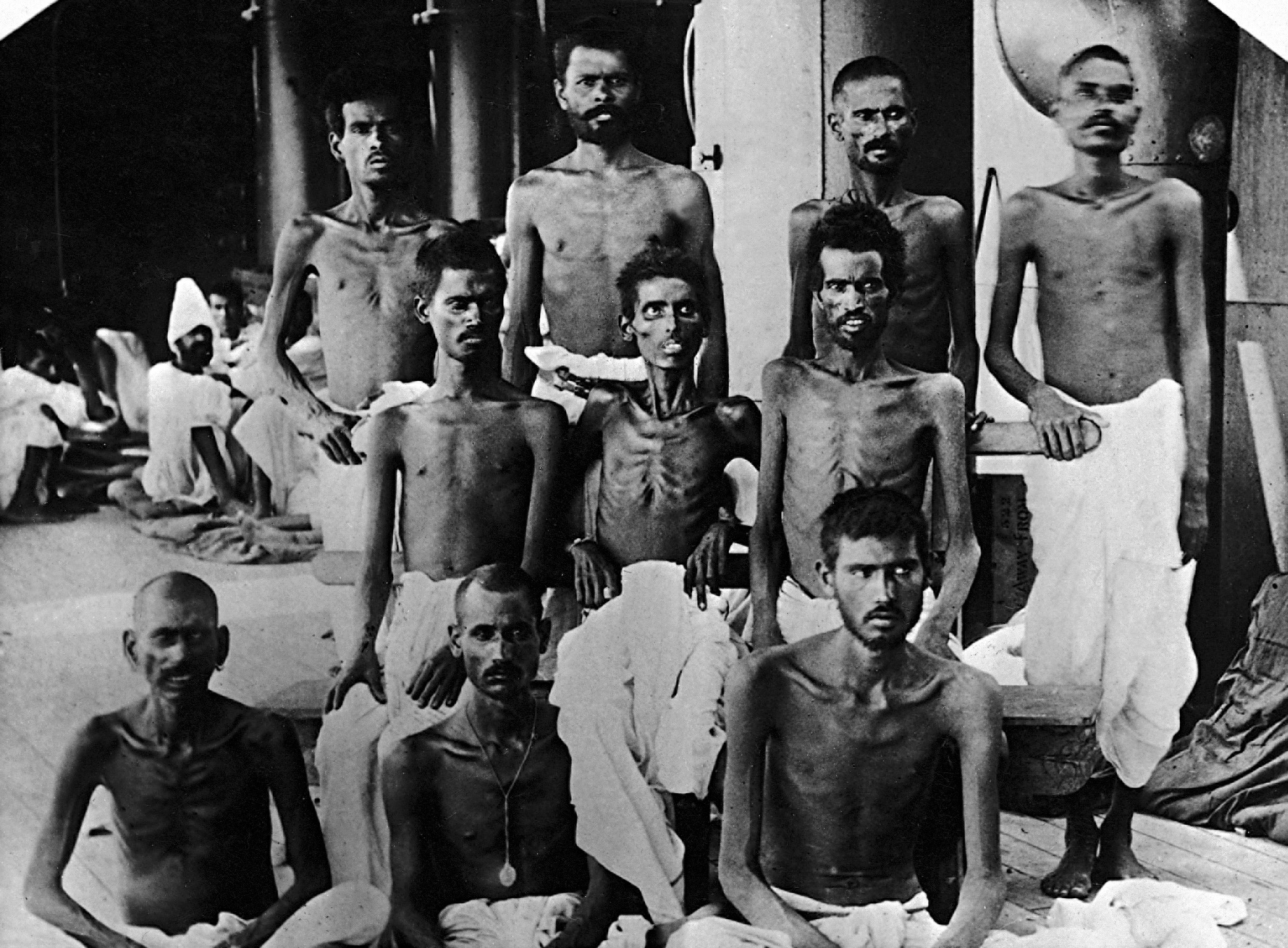
The garrison, two-thirds of which was Indian, surrendered on 29 April 1916. During captivity many died from heat, disease and neglect. These emaciated men were photographed after they had been liberated during an exchange of prisoners.

Jan Morris, a British historian, described the loss of Kut as "the most abject capitulation in Britain's military history." After this humiliating loss, General Lake and General Gorringe were removed from command. The new commander was General Maude, who trained and organized his army and then launched a successful campaign.

Ten months after the siege of Kut, the British Indian Army conquered the whole region from Kut to Baghdad as part of the fall of Baghdad on 11 March 1917. With Baghdad captured, the British administration undertook vital reconstruction of the war-torn country and Kut was slowly rebuilt.

Some of the Indian prisoners of war from Kut later came to join the Ottoman Indian Volunteer Corps under the influence of Deobandis of the Silk Letter Movement and with the encouragement of the German High Command. These soldiers, along with those recruited from the prisoners from the European battlefields, fought alongside Ottoman forces on a number of fronts. The Indians were led by Amba Prasad Sufi, who during the war was joined by Kedar Nath Sondhi, Rishikesh Letha, and Amin Chaudhry. These Indian troops were involved in the capture of the frontier city of Karman and the detention of the British consul there, and they also successfully harassed Sir Percy Sykes' Persian campaign against the Baluchi and Persian tribal chiefs who were aided by the Germans.

== See also ==
- Second Battle of Kut, which took place on 23 February 1917.

== Sources ==
- Ellinwood, DeWitt C. (2005). Between Two Worlds: A Rajput Officer in the Indian Army, 1905–21 : Based on the Diary of Amar Singh of Jaipur. University Press of America. ISBN 9780761831136. – Total pages: 679
- Herbert, Edwin (2003). Small Wars and Skirmishes 1902–1918: Early Twentieth-century Colonial Campaigns in Africa, Asia and the Americas. Nottingham, Foundry Books Publications. ISBN 1-901543-05-6.
- Knight, Paul (2013). The British Army In Mesopotamia, 1914–1918. Jefferson: McFarland & Company. ISBN 978-0-7864-7049-5.
- Qureshi, M Naeem (1999). Pan-Islam in British Indian Politics: A Study of the Khilafat Movement, 1918–1924. Brill Academic Publishers. ISBN 90-04-11371-1.
- Perry, James M. (2005). Arrogant Armies: Great Military Disasters and the Generals Behind Them. Edison, New Jersey: Castle Books. ISBN 978-0-7858-2023-9.
- Rogan, Eugene (2016). The Fall of the Ottomans. Penguin Books.
- Spackman, Tony, ed. (2008). Captured at Kut, Prisoner of the Turks: The Great War Diaries of Colonel W.C. Spackman. Pen & Sword Military. ISBN 978-184415873-7.
- Sykes, Peter (1921). "South Persia and the Great War". The Geographical Journal. 58 (2). Blackwell Publishing on behalf of The Royal Geographical Society: 101–116. Bibcode:1921GeogJ..58..101S. doi:10.2307/1781457. ISSN 0016-7398. JSTOR 1781457.
