= Sir Fenton Aylmer, 13th Baronet =

Recipient of the Victoria Cross

Lieutenant-General Sir Fenton Aylmer VC Bt KCB
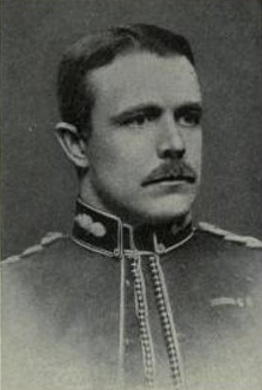
- Born: 5 April 1862; Hastings, Sussex
- Died: 3 September 1935 (aged 73); Lingfield Road, Wimbledon, Surrey
- Burial place: Golders Green, London
- Spouse(s): Elsie Julie Oppermann, Lady Risley
- Military career
- Allegiance: United Kingdom
- Branch: British Army
- Service years: 1880–1919
- Rank: Lieutenant-General
- Unit: Corps of Royal Engineers
- Commands: Tigris Corps; Commandant, Royal Engineers
- Conflicts: Burmese resistance movement 1885–1895; Hunza–Nagar Campaign; Chitral Expedition; First World War; Mesopotamian campaign; Siege of Kut; Battle of Dujaila
- Awards: Victoria Cross; Knight Commander of the Order of the Bath

Lieutenant-General Sir Fenton John Aylmer, 13th Baronet, VC, KCB (5 April 1862 – 3 September 1935) was an Anglo-Irish British Army officer and a recipient of the Victoria Cross. He was in command of the first failed efforts to break the siege of Kut in 1916. From a military background, Aylmer was commissioned into the Indian Army, and immediately involved in fierce fighting on the north-west frontier. In a singularly heroic action, still in his twenties, he helped rescue Townshend's garrison at Chitral, spearheading the relief column. For his valorous conduct he was awarded the Victoria Cross, and rapid promotion through the officer class.

== Early career ==
Born the son of Captain Fenton John Aylmer and Isabella Eleanor Darling. Aylmer attended the Royal Military Academy, Woolwich, as a Gentleman Cadet, in the same class as Reginald Wingate, and was promoted lieutenant on 27 July 1880. He took part in the Burma expedition between 1886 and 1887.

== Victoria Cross ==
Fenton was 29 years old, and a captain in the Corps of Royal Engineers, British Army and Bengal Sappers & Miners (British Indian Army), during the Hunza–Nagar Campaign, India when he won the Victoria Cross in 1891 for the following deed:

On 2 December 1891 during the assault on Nilt Fort, British India, Captain Aylmer, with the storming party, forced open the inner gate with gun-cotton which he had placed and ignited, and although severely wounded, fired 19 shots with his revolver, killing several of the enemy, and remained fighting until, fainting from loss of blood, he was carried out of action.

He was promoted major on 18 October 1893 in recognition of his services during the Hunza-Nagar Expedition, and was part of the Chitral Expedition in 1895. Further service with the Royal Engineers saw him promoted a brevet Lieutenant-colonel. In July 1901 he was appointed Assistant Quartermaster general in India, and promoted to the substantive rank of colonel. In August 1904 he was made a colonel on the staff. In June 1907 he was made a Companion of the Order of the Bath in the 1907 Birthday Honours.

In March 1912, having been promoted to major general in February 1909, he became adjutant general, India, taking over from Lieutenant General Sir Arthur Barrett.

In 1913 he married Lady Risley, the widow of Sir Herbert Hope Risley, head of the Indian Civil Service. She was born Elsie Julie Oppermann, daughter of Friedrich Oppermann.

== First World War ==
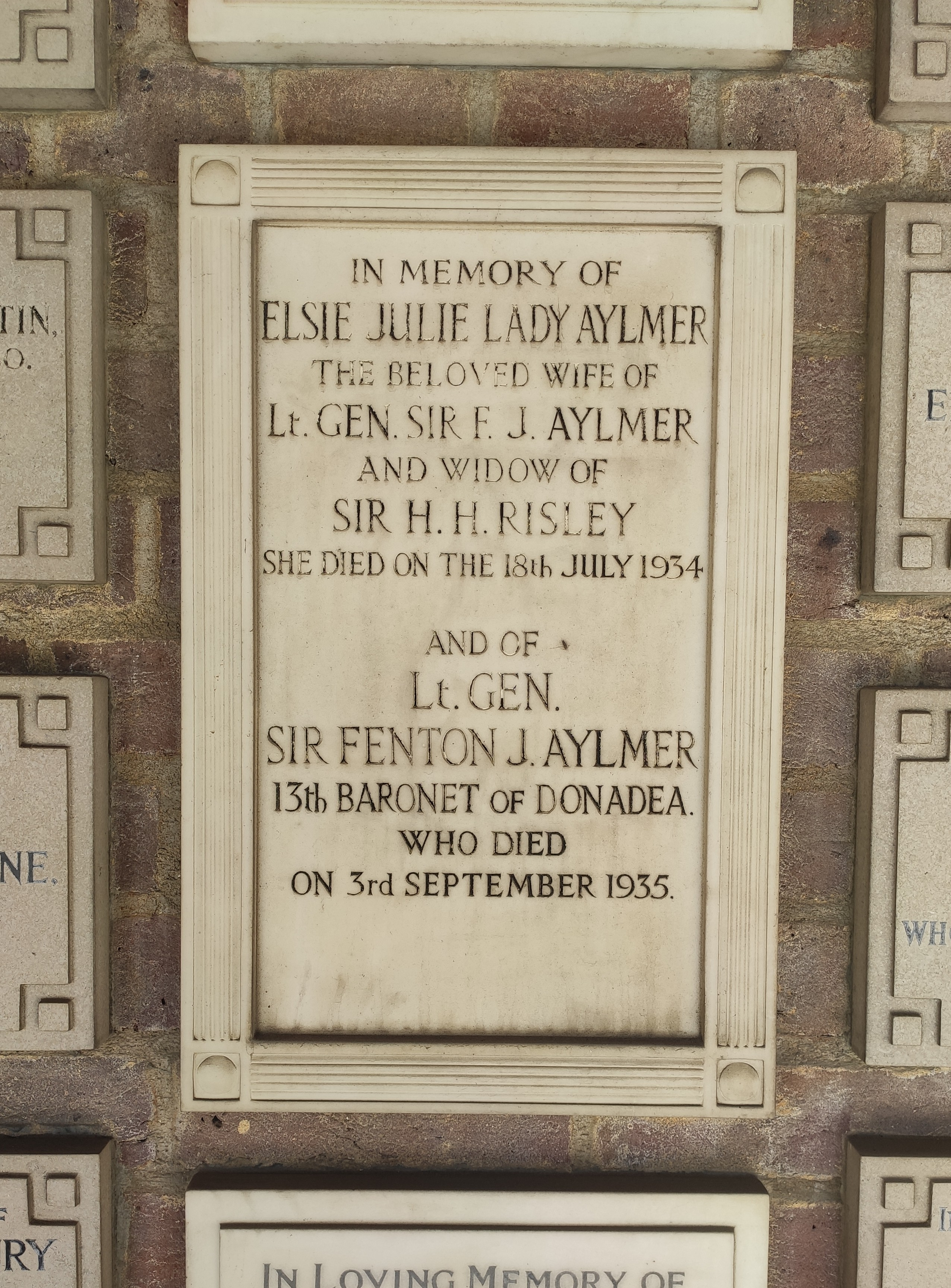
Commemorative plaque dedicated to Aylmer and his wife at Golders Green Crematorium

Having been promoted to lieutenant general on 11 June 1915, Aylmer was sent to Mesopotamia to take over command of the 7th (Meerut) Division. However, shortly after his arrival, he was put in charge of the Tigris Corps that was assembled as the first effort to end the siege of Kut. Tigris Corps comprised the Meerut Division, the 12th Indian Division, and a number of other smaller military units. All told he had more than 20,000 men. They left Basra in late December 1915 and arrived at Sheikh Sa'ad on 3 January 1916. While the 12th Indian Division (under command of General George Gorringe) made a diversionary move near Nasiriyeh, the 7th (under the command of General Younghusband) staged a direct assault on the Ottoman positions on 6 January (the Battle of Sheikh Sa'ad). After two days of fighting, the Ottoman army withdrew. The British sustained approximately 4,000 casualties – much more than the medical units could cope with. The Ottoman troops, under the generalship of Baron von der Goltz only withdrew some six miles up river and occupied another defensive position near the edge of the Suwaikiya Marshes. A British assault on this position on 13 January was partially successful, the position was carried but again with significant losses (some 1,600 casualties) (the Battle of Wadi).

By now, a third division had been added to Aylmer's Tigris Corps, the 3rd (Lahore) Division. This new division, along with the weakened 7th Division, attacked Ottoman defensive works at Hanna on 21 January (the Battle of Hanna). This assault was a complete failure. The Ottoman troops held their trench lines while some 2,700 British soldiers were killed or wounded.

General Aylmer was reinforced with another division, the 13th (Western) Division. The next month was spent resting the troops and probing the Ottoman defensive positions. With time running out on Major-General Townshend's garrison in Kut, Aylmer finally launched a two pronged attack on the Ottoman positions, one attack at the Sinn Abtar Redoubt, the other attack at the Dujaila Redoubt. The attacks were launched on 7 March 1916. Both attacks failed due to lack of initiative and an inability to coordinate the timing of the assaults: they ended up being sequential, not simultaneous as was intended. The British lost some 4,000 casualties.

Fenton Aylmer was replaced by the former commander of the 12th Indian division, Major-General Gorringe. He did not command in battle again, but served as a divisional commander in India from 1915 to 1917 before retiring from the British Army in 1919.

== Final years ==
He was appointed colonel commandant of the Royal Engineers in November 1922, backdated to 15 September.

Following his death at the age of 73 in September 1935 he was cremated at the Golders Green Crematorium, where his ashes remain.

His VC is displayed at the Royal Engineers Museum in Chatham, Kent, England.

== Sources ==
- Tucker, Spencer C. (1997). World War 1. Routledge. ISBN 978-1857283914.
- Irish Winners of the Victoria Cross (Richard Doherty & David Truesdale, 2000)
- Monuments to Courage (David Harvey, 1999)
- The Register of the Victoria Cross (This England, 1997)
- The Sapper VCs (Gerald Napier, 1998)

Military offices
Preceded by Sir Arthur Barrett	Adjutant-General, India; 1912–1915	Succeeded by John Walter
Baronetage of Ireland
Preceded by Arthur Percy FitzGerald Aylmer	Baronet of Donadea; 1928–1935	Succeeded by Gerald Arthur Evans-Freke Aylmer
