= Ikeathy and Oughterany =

Ikeathy and Oughterany Uí Chéithigh agus Uachtar Fhine (Irish)
- Barony
- Interactive map of Ikeathy and Oughterany
- Sovereign state: Ireland
- County: Kildare

Area
  - Total: 104.22 km^{2} (40.24 sq mi)

Ikeathy and Oughterany (Irish: Uí Chéithigh agus Uachtar Fhine) is a barony in County Kildare, Ireland.

== Etymology ==
Ikeathy takes its name from the Uí Cheithig túath, who claimed descent from Ailill Cétach, a son of the legendary Leinster king Cathair Mór.

Oughterany derives its name from the Uachtar Fine ("upper tribe").

== Location ==
Ikeathy and Oughterany is found in northern County Kildare, reaching from Clongowes Wood to the Royal Canal, mostly to the east of the Enfield Blackwater.

== History ==
Ikeathy and Oughterany was the ancient lands of the Uí Cheithig and the Uachtar Fine. The separate baronies were united by 1608. The Cenél nUcha were also noted here. Around 1300 the barony was held by the Rochfort family, then reverted to the Crown, who regranted it to John Wogan, Justiciar of Ireland. In later times the Lawless family were lords of Cloncurry.

== List of settlements ==
Below is a list of settlements in Ikeathy and Oughterany:

- Kilcock
- Rathcoffey
