= Aylmer baronets =

Baronetcy in the Baronetage of Ireland

Arms of Aylmer of Balrath: Argent, a cross sable between four Cornish choughs proper

There have been two baronetcies created for persons with the surname Aylmer, both in the Baronetage of Ireland. Both titles are extant.

The Aylmer Baronetcy, of Donadea in the County of Kildare, was created in the Baronetage of Ireland on 25 January 1622 for Gerald Aylmer of Oughterany, County Kildare: he was the son of Richard Aylmer of Lyons Hill and Elinor Fleming, of the family of Baron Slane. The Aylmers were a wealthy Anglo-Irish landowning family. The 13th Baronet was a recipient of the Victoria Cross.

The Aylmer Baronetcy, of Balrath in the County of Meath, was created in the Baronetage of Ireland on 6 November 1662. For more information on this creation, see Baron Aylmer.

== Aylmer baronets, of Donadea (1622) ==
- Sir Gerald Aylmer, 1st Baronet (1548–1634)
- Sir Andrew Aylmer, 2nd Baronet (1613–1671)
- Sir Fitzgerald Aylmer, 3rd Baronet (1663–1685)
- Sir Justin Aylmer, 4th Baronet (1682–1711)
- Sir Gerald Aylmer, 5th Baronet (1703–1737)
- Sir FitzGerald Aylmer, 6th Baronet (1736–1794)
- Sir Fenton Aylmer, 7th Baronet (1770–1816)
- Sir Gerald George Aylmer, 8th Baronet (1798–1878)
- Sir Gerald George Aylmer, 9th Baronet (1830–1883)
- Sir Justin Gerald Aylmer, 10th Baronet (1863–1885)
- Sir Arthur Percy Aylmer, 11th Baronet (1801–1885)
  - Captain Fenton John Aylmer (1835–1862)
- Sir Arthur Percy Fitzgerald Aylmer, 12th Baronet (1858–1928)
- Sir Fenton John Aylmer, VC, 13th Baronet (1862–1935)#
  - John Evans Freke Aylmer (1838–1907)
- Sir Gerald Arthur Evans-Freke Aylmer, 14th Baronet (1869–1939)
- Sir Fenton Gerald Aylmer, 15th Baronet (1901–1987)
- Sir Richard John Aylmer, 16th Baronet (born 1937)

The heir apparent is the present holder's son Fenton Paul Aylmer (born 1965).

== Aylmer baronets, of Balrath (1662) ==
- see Baron Aylmer

== In fiction ==
A fictional Aylmer baronetcy appears in Anthony Trollope's 1866 novel The Belton Estate. The family seat is at Aylmer Castle, in Yorkshire.
