= Hanna defile =

Location in Iraq

The Hanna Defile (Umm El-Hanna defile) is a narrow strip of dry land between the River Tigris and the Suwaikiya Marshes.
