= Battle of Bughaila =

- Part of the Mesopotamian campaign of World War I
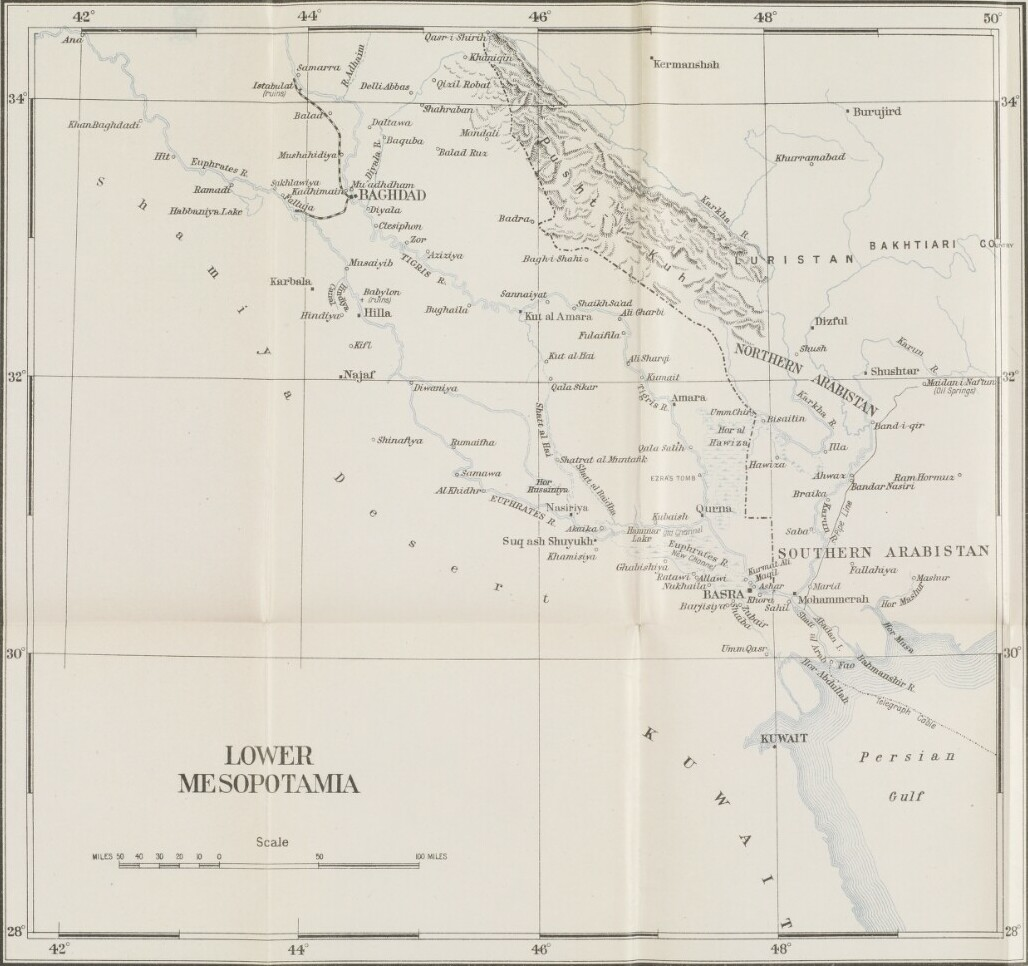
- Map of Lower Mesopotamia showing the location of the town of Bughaila
Date	25–26 February 1917
Location	Around Bughaila, Ottoman Iraq (modern-day An Numaniyah, Wasit Governorate of Iraq) 32°30′0″N 45°20′0″E
Result	British victory

Belligerents
British Empire; British Raj	Ottoman Empire

Commanders and leaders
Frederick Maude; William Marshall; Walter de Sausmarez Cayley; Sydney Francis Crocker	Halil Kut; Kâzım Karabekir; Şevket Galatalı; Bekir Sami

Strength
Unknown (30,000 according to Turkish reports)	6,000–10,000

Casualties and losses
630	3,000 prisoners
- Location within Iraq

The Battle of Bughaila (Note: Turkish: Bagile Muharebesi) (25–26 February 1917) was a military engagement in the Mesopotamian campaign of World War I between British and Ottoman Turkish forces. It was fought shortly after the British recapture of Kut in February 1917.

== Background ==
At the outset of World War I, the British began preparing to invade Iraq in September 1914, anticipating the possibility of war with the Ottoman Empire. On 10 October 1914, General Delamain, commander of the forces specially trained in India, received orders to prepare for the protection of British interests in the Persian Gulf. Once preparations were complete, the troops departed from Bombay on 6 October and assembled on the Bahrain Islands on 23 October. After Britain declared war on the Ottoman Empire on 5 November 1914, fighting broke out along the Iraqi frontier. The following day, the Indian Expeditionary Force "D," consisting of the Sixth Division, landed near Shatt al-Arab. Basra was occupied on 22 November, followed by Qurna on 9 December.

On 22 April 1915, Major General C. V. F. Townshend assumed command of the Sixth Division. In the months that followed, British forces steadily advanced into Iraq according to plan. Amarah was occupied on 3 June, and Nasiriyah on 24 July. Encouraged by these rapid successes, General John Nixon, commander of the British Expeditionary Force in Iraq, began considering the capture of Baghdad. At the same time, decision-makers in both India and London believed that conquering Baghdad would help restore British prestige in the Middle East after the defeat at Gallipoli. Consequently, General Nixon ordered Charles Townshend, commander of the Sixth Division, to advance from Amara along the river and capture Kut al-Amara, located approximately 190 kilometers away.

Orders were given on 24 October 1915 for the British troops to begin an operation to capture Baghdad. Before deciding to proceed with the invasion, Townshend considered it unfavorable to advance without substantial reinforcements. As a result, he was promised support from two additional divisions. In particular, Sir Percy Cox, the officer responsible for political affairs, argued that Townshend's capture of Baghdad would be equivalent to the conquest of Istanbul, and that such news would have a profound impact across Asia. The British were reportedly dreaming of being in Baghdad by Christmas Day. After capturing Kut al-Amara, General Townshend advanced toward Baghdad in mid-November with a force of 15,000 soldiers.

Townshend advanced toward Ctesiphon on 20 November. On 22 November, he engaged in a new battle against the Turkish forces under the command of Colonel Nurettin Pasha. The battle was extremely bloody, and both sides suffered heavy losses. Ultimately, the British forces were forced to retreat. Closely pursued by the Turkish troops commanded by Colonel Nurettin, the British withdrew to Kut al-Amara. Following the retreat, General Townshend and his troops took refuge in Kut al-Amara on 3 December. Hoping that reinforcements would soon arrive, General Townshend decided to establish defensive positions in the town against the advancing Turkish forces. On 7 December, the Turkish Army under the command of Colonel Nurettin surrounded the British forces at Kut al-Amara from all sides. Several rescue attempts organized by the British Government and the British-Iraq Army Command proved unsuccessful, and the British forces in Kut al-Amara were ultimately forced to surrender.

=== British recovery after Kut ===
During the First World War, Frederick Stanley Maude emerged as one of the British Army's most capable senior commanders in the Middle Eastern theatre, gaining a reputation for reorganising exhausted forces and directing successful offensives in difficult conditions. His rapid advancement reflected both the pressures of wartime command and confidence in his leadership abilities.

He was a staff officer with the III Corps when in October 1914 he was promoted to Brigadier-General and given command of the 14th Brigade. He was wounded in April 1915 and returned home to recover. He returned to France in May and in June was promoted to Major-General and transferred to command 33rd Division, then still in training. However, in mid-August he was instead given charge of 13th Division at Suvla. The 13th suffered heavy casualties retreating from Suvla and landing, and later evacuating, from Helles before being shifted to Mesopotamia in March 1916.

They arrived to catch the end of the British failure at the Siege of Kut, and Maude was promoted to Lieutenant-General and replaced George Gorringe as commander of the newly dubbed Tigris Corps (III Army Corps) in July 1916. Despite being instructed to do no more than hold the existing line, Maude set about reorganising and re-supplying his mixed British and Indian forces. He was made commander of all Allied forces in Mesopotamia in late July 1916.

Given reinforcements and more equipment, Maude directed his force in a steady series of victories. Advancing up the Tigris and winning the battles of Mohammed Abdul Hassan, Hai and Dahra in January 1917, alongside recapturing Kut in February 1917. After the reoccupation of Kut al-Amara, General Maude lost no time in organising the pursuit of the beaten Turks with gunboats, aeroplanes, and cavalry, while the infantry were ordered to make forced marches in order to keep the Turks on the run and prevent them rallying.

=== Turkish withdrawal from Kut to Sivri Devre ===
Following reports of the Second Battle of Kut, in which the XVIII Corps narrowly escaped annihilation, the Acting Commander-in-Chief Enver Pasha sent a coded order to the Sixth Army demanding that the British units that had crossed to the left bank of the Tigris be destroyed or captured at all costs. If this proved impossible, he insisted that the army go on the defensive during the Shamran phase and halt the British advance.

The commander of the XVIII Corps recognized that the situation would become dangerous if the British continued their offensive and therefore decided to maintain the defense in the Sivri Devre area. In accordance with the general withdrawal order issued at 8:00 PM, the 43rd Regiment at Kuru Kerme and the 41st and 156th Regiments occupying the western side of the sand dunes assembled at Imam Muhammad Castle under the command of Colonel Şevket Bey. Following the Baghdad road past Reşit Castle, they systematically withdrew 4 kilometers behind the previously selected and prepared defense line in the Sivri Devre area. During this withdrawal, the units marched approximately 16 kilometers.

== Prelude ==
=== British preparations ===
On 24 February at 19:25, General Maude issued orders for pursuing operations to be carried out the following day. It was clear that the Turkish main force was in full retreat up the Tigris, although its rearguard had so far succeeded in delaying the advance of the British cavalry and the 14th Division.

The Cavalry Division was ordered to move off at 06:00 the next morning and operate around the Turks' northern flank. Simultaneously, one of the divisions of III Corps was to advance up the left bank of the Tigris along the route which the enemy main force would be compelled to follow due to the lack of water inland. The second III Corps division was held in reserve, ready to move westward if required. The senior naval officer was requested to cooperate with the operation using the flotilla, while the I Corps was tasked with completing the clearance of the battlefields on both banks of the Tigris and the Hai as far as the western side of the Shumran peninsula. By this stage, the Tigris upstream had been opened to British shipping.

That evening, General Maude sent the following telegram to the Chief of the Imperial General Staff:

"In view of change brought about in the situation by recent successes on the Tigris front, I shall be glad to learn whether H.M. Government in any way desire to modify their instructions conveyed to me in your telegram of 30th September 1916.

Until I get your reply I do not propose to delay, but intend to follow up retreating enemy closely; being careful, however, to do nothing which will prevent me from adjusting my position readily according to your further orders.

Enemy has suffered very severely during past two and-a-half months, and his losses have been out of all proportion to his strength. Also we have captured 4,500 prisoners, besides guns and machine guns, rifles, ammunition and material. This series of reverses would have completely broken troops possessed of less fighting qualities than the Turks. Opportunity would, therefore, seem favourable for further advance, if this accords with policy of H.M. Government. Scope of such advance would depend on information received as to further enemy reinforcements being diverted in this direction. Owing, however, to heavy losses already incurred by Turkish forces as above, these-unless considerably more than we anticipate at present-have now lost much of their value."

During the night of 24–25 February, the Turkish rearguard was reported, both by the 35th Infantry Brigade and the patrols of the Cavalry Division, to have withdrawn from its positions of 24 February. Although, in both cases, contact with the enemy had been lost, General Maude still hoped, by vigorous action on the part of his cavalry, to deal the Turks further heavy blows before they got out of reach. This hope was sustained by the reports next morning of the British aeroplanes, which said that the retiring Turkish main body was about Bughaila, covered by a rearguard of some 1,500 rifles with seventeen to twenty guns, which occupied a canal extending northwards from the river near Imam Mahdi.

=== Turkish preparations ===
The commander of the Sixth Army, after British forces crossed to the left bank of the Tigris River on 24 February 1917 and could not be pushed back into the river by counterattacks, ordered the immediate transfer of the 6th Division of the XIII Corps from the Iranian theater of operations to Baghdad. He was also forced to reinforce the XVIII Corps with units transferred from other fronts.

The British III Corps, by not continuing its attack after 17:00 on 24 February 1917 and instead remaining on the line it had captured to reorganize there, gave the XVIII Corps an opportunity to withdraw and regroup its units deployed along the left bank of the Tigris from the Falahiya position to the Shumran sector. During the withdrawal, the commander of the 45th Division, Lieutenant Colonel İsmail Hakkı, was wounded in the foot after being kicked by an animal. In his place, the commander of the 52nd Division, Lieutenant Colonel Bekir Sami, was appointed on 25 February 1917 at 11:00. Under the command of the 52nd Division commander were the 141st, 142nd, and 3rd Regiments, together with the 45th Division engineer company, medical company, the 43rd Regiment, and the 52nd Artillery Regiment. The 40th Regiment of the 52nd Division had suffered heavy losses during the Battle of Shumran and had effectively ceased to exist; the 45 surviving soldiers who could be withdrawn assembled east of Imam Mahdi together with divisional personnel.

==== Turkish Positions ====
The withdrawal was completed after sunset, near midnight. The Turkish units assembled in the Sivri Devre sector, on the western edge of the Husayniya sector, where they established a defensive position five kilometers wide and carried out fortification and defensive preparations as far as possible. Although the troops were extremely exhausted, they continued working on the fortifications until dawn. Even so, the fortifications did not progress beyond basic trench works. To provide depth to the defense, three successive defensive lines were designated.

Muhammad Amin in Baghdad and the Story of its Last Fall says that in the early hours of 25 February, the XVIII Corps, now composed of about 10,000 fighting men, including the weak 4th and 14th Divisions, arrived at the position supposed to have been prepared near Qala Shadi. There it occupied an old disused canal, which for the most part had not been prepared for defence, and where, in spite of extreme fatigue, it worked till the morning at entrenching.

The three-kilometer sector south of the Sivri Devre position was held by the 51st Division, while the two-kilometer sector to the north was occupied by the 45th Division. The 141st and 142nd Regiments had entered the position by making use of the trenches in front of their sectors, while the 3rd Regiment had carried out fortification work. Because the left flank of the position was highly exposed, the 11th Company of the 141st Regiment—reinforced by the 45th Division's engineer company and two machine guns—was deployed in echelon formation and placed under the command of the 3rd Regiment's commander. The Şevket Bey Detachment, composed of the 43rd Infantry Regiment together with the 41st Infantry and Depot Regiments, was kept in reserve, while the 18th Cavalry Regiment was assigned responsibility for protecting the left flank of the position.

== Battle of Sivri Devre ==
=== Prelude ===
The commander of the III Corps launched an attack at 06:00 on 25 February 1917 using the 35th Brigade of the 13th Infantry Division, positioned in the Kuru Kerme area, along with the Cavalry Division advancing on both the southern and northern flanks of the 13th Division. The 14th Division was moved closer to the Reşit Fortress area so it could join operations in the 13th Division sector if required. The river flotilla was to advance along the left bank of the Tigris in support of the 13th Division's attack. Meanwhile, the I Corps, advancing along the left bank of the Tigris, was tasked with clearing the area extending from Falahiya to Sivri Devre.

The advanced guard of the 13th Division - consisting of 'D' Squadron of the 1/1st Hertfordshire Yeomanry, the 68th Brigade Royal Field Artillery, the 72nd Company Royal Engineers, and the 38th Infantry Brigade - departed from the Shumran peninsula to advance along the left bank of the Tigris River. The cavalry division, delayed while drawing rations, departed approximately forty-five minutes later and advanced further to the north of the 13th Division. As planned, the British forces launched their attack at 06:00 on 25 February 1917, but they discovered that the Turkish forces had withdrawn from Kuru Kerme during the night of 24/25 February and reported the situation to corps headquarters.

=== Action at Alqayat-al-Gaharbigah ===
==== Assault on the first canal line ====
Both the 13th Division (leading the advance) and the Cavalry Division continued their advance and approached the Sivri Devre position. At about 10:30, the Hertfordshire Yeomanry, which had made contact with the Turkish rearguard positioned in a canal running roughly north-north-east from the north-west corner of the Husaini bend, received orders to contain the enemy until the infantry arrived. Advancing on foot, the Yeomanry drove the Turks from several forward positions, apparently located in front of the Turkish left flank, and occupied them.

At 11:00, the leading elements of the 38th Brigade reached the north-east corner of the Husaini bend and came under fairly heavy Turkish artillery fire. A battery from the 66th Field Artillery Brigade, accompanying the vanguard, immediately moved forward and opened fire on the Turkish guns. This enabled the leading battalions of the 38th Infantry Brigade to continue their advance and force back Turkish outposts southward of the line held by the Hertfordshire Yeomanry. Meanwhile, the naval flotilla — Tarantula, Mantis, Moth, Gadfly, and Butterfly — which had passed through the Shumran bridge at about 08:00, arrived to support the attack with naval gunfire.

By 12:30 p.m., it was clear that the 38th Brigade's advanced line — 6th King's Own, 6th East Lancashire, and 6th Loyal North Lancashire, in that order from the right — had been stopped by heavy rifle and machine-gun fire from about seven hundred yards away from the enemy's trenches. The line then began to dig itself in. At this time, the fourth Battalion of the Brigade, the 6th South Lancashire, was sent to the right in an attempt to turn the enemy's flank. After passing through the line of the Hertfordshire Yeomanry, the Battalion secured a position in a section of the enemy's line about one and a half miles north of the Tigris bank, but it still found itself south of the Turks' left flank. The Battalion's War Diary states:

...Enemy encountered about noon, flank guard became merged with advance guns and captured watercourse from enemy. Enemy still held left of watercourse. Party led by 2nd Lt. Jackson cleared watercourse on left with bayonet in face of terrific machine-gun fire, rifle grenades and bombs. 2nd Lts Jackson and Jefferson killed, 2nd Lts. Fletcher and Sharpley wounded, 21 men killed and 58 wounded.

The CWGC Debt of Honour database records 24 men of the battalion were killed in this action. All are commemorated on the Basra Memorial.

After it became clear that the 38th Brigade alone could make little further progress. At 14:00, the 39th Brigade was therefore ordered to move to the right and attack the Turkish left flank. Advancing accordingly, its leading battalions — the 9th Worcestershire, 7th Gloucestershire, and North Staffordshire Regiment, from right to left — captured the section of the canal line held by the Turkish left, just north of the position occupied by the South Lancashire battalion.

==== Assault on the second canal line ====
A rapid reconnaissance of the area, which was rough terrain intersected by numerous watercourses, revealed that the Turks were holding a second defensive line in another canal approximately 600 yards west of, and roughly parallel to, the line just captured. Only part of this second position appeared to be entrenched.

Without delay, the 39th Brigade launched an attack on the second line with considerable speed and determination, supported effectively by the 55th and 66th Field Artillery Brigades. Some of the artillery batteries moved into action within 1,200 yards of the Turkish positions. Although the artillery was well handled, it operated at a disadvantage, having to deploy in the open against Turkish guns firing from well-concealed emplacements. Naval gunfire also provided effective support during the assault.

On the right, the Worcestershires encountered little resistance and suffered relatively few casualties. In the centre, the Gloucestershires faced stronger opposition while attacking an entrenched section of the canal line. On the left, the North Staffordshires experienced the fiercest fighting, coming under heavy enfilading artillery, machine-gun, and rifle fire from their flank. The Turkish defenders in front of them yielded only after close combat with the bayonet. Nevertheless, the speed and momentum of the attack reduced British casualties to fewer than might otherwise have been expected. The 39th Brigade succeeded in capturing the position, killing or taking prisoner a considerable number of Turkish troops.

==== Assault on the third canal line ====
The Turks were discovered to be holding yet another canal line several hundred yards behind their second line, but the 39th Brigade continued its advance without hesitation. Pressing forward, the brigade captured this third line as well, taking between 700 and 800 prisoners. In response to this situation, the commander of the XVIII Corps moved two battalions of the 9th Regiment—previously held in reserve in the 51st Division on the right flank—to the rear of the left flank, and launched a counter-attack against the southern flank of the 39th Brigade, which had penetrated the Turkish positions. During the confusion, many of the Turkish prisoners succeeded in rearming themselves and joined the assault on the North Staffordshires, creating considerable disorder in the trenches.

As darkness fell, the British supporting artillery was forced to reduce and eventually cease its barrage, making the position more difficult to hold. As a result, the North Staffordshires, together with a company of the Gloucestershires on their right, were driven back. The remainder of the British line, however, maintained its position, and the Turkish counter-attack was ultimately repulsed. The North Staffordshires then advanced once more and reoccupied the lost ground. Fighting continued on the left of the captured line until approximately 02:00 in the morning of 26 February, when the Turkish forces withdrew, leaving behind many dead and wounded. Several hundred of the prisoners taken in the first attack escaped during the counter-attack and later during the night; however, 334 prisoners (14 officers, 320 rank) remained in the hands of the 39th Brigade.

==== Aftermath ====
At approximately 18:00, the 40th Brigade was moved to the right rear of the 39th Brigade in preparation for operations on that flank the following morning. However, about three hours later, the brigade was withdrawn and returned to the vicinity of divisional headquarters.

The 14th Division, which had conducted active patrol operations throughout the night of 24–25 February, concentrated at 07:00 on 25 February north of the Shumran peninsula, prepared to advance when ordered. Orders directing the division to march at 15:00 were received at 11:45. At 16:30, while the division was advancing, a staff officer who had been sent forward to the 13th Division to assess the situation returned with updated information. In response to his report, General Raleigh Gilbert Egerton ordered the 35th Brigade to advance and support the 13th Division if required. However, the General Officer Commanding (GOC) of the 13th Division stated that assistance was unnecessary. Consequently, at 18:00, the 14th Division went into bivouac just east of the 13th Division's headquarters.

The 13th Division suffered a total of 556 casualties on 25 February, the vast majority of which were incurred by the 38th and 39th Brigades. (Note: The heaviest sufferers were the 7th North Staffordshire with 144 casualties, the 6th East Lancashire with 120, the 7th Gloucestershire with 111, and the 6th South Lancashire with 77. The 55th Brigade, R.F.A., also lost 20 men.) During the afternoon, the division observed the cavalry's artillery in action to the north-west, and it was hoped that the cavalry would be able to cut off the Turkish retreat. However, the cavalry operations failed to achieve a decisive result. The naval flotilla remained in action throughout the day. Although all of the gunboats were struck by the Turkish shells, none sustained serious damage, and only a single casualty was suffered among their crews.

=== Affair of Imam Mahdi ===
Air reconnaissance had found the Turkish main body at Bughaila and a rearguard of 2,000 men with 20 guns at Imam Mahdi. Confusing orders were given to the cavalry commander, Brigadier-General Sydney Francis Crocker who understood that Imam Mahdi was to be captured. Advancing on a wide front, the Cavalry Division deployed with the 7th Cavalry Brigade on the right, divisional troops in the centre, and the 6th Cavalry Brigade on the left. By 11:30, the division had reached a position approximately four miles north-east of Imam Mahdi, facing westward. The 7th Brigade, which was somewhat ahead and to the north-west of the 6th Brigade, was ordered to close in on the latter, but a misunderstanding delayed the manoeuvre.

At about 13:00, when the division was roughly four miles north-north-west of Imam Mahdi, the 6th Brigade received orders to wheel left and advance on the village, while the 7th Brigade was instructed to conform to the movement on the right flank of the 6th Brigade. Approximately forty-five minutes later, when the 6th Brigade had reached a position about 2.5 miles north of Imam Mahdi, the leading regiment, the 21st Cavalry, came under fire and was halted. The remainder of the brigade was then subjected to artillery fire from positions to the south.

The 21st Cavalry dismounted and began an attack on foot, while three squadrons — one from the 14th Hussars and two from the 22nd Cavalry — were ordered to move to the right in an attempt to outflank the enemy. Meanwhile, the 7th Brigade received revised orders directing it to join the attack by extending the line to the left of the 6th Brigade. The 13th Hussars and the 13th Lancers accordingly advanced dismounted, and the entire line gradually pushed forward. It was estimated that the cavalry was opposed by at least 1,000 entrenched infantry, strongly supported by artillery. The Turkish fire effectively halted the advance approximately two miles north of Imam Mahdi. Counterattacks by the reserve 43rd Regiment and Şevket Bey Detachment against the left flank, followed by the intervention of the 18th Cavalry Regiment stationed in the Shadi Kermesi region, ultimately brought the British attack to a halt.

At 14:30, General Crocker received wireless instructions from Maude directing the cavalry division to operate immediately against the Turkish bridge at Bughaila. Orders were therefore issued to both cavalry brigades to disengage and concentrate for a move on Bughaila. This proved difficult, however, as the regiments were already heavily engaged. Only with considerable effort were they finally withdrawn and concentrated by about 17:30. During these operations, the six armoured cars of the 13th Light Armoured Motor Battery, which had been operating with the cavalry since midday, provided valuable support. With less than half an hour remaining before sunset, and both men and horses heavily fatigued, the situation was further aggravated by the absence of any water source closer than the Tigris. General Crocker therefore decided to withdraw eastwards. The cavalry division retired for approximately 10 to 12 miles and, shortly before midnight, bivouacked on the bank of the Tigris near the headquarters of the 13th Division.

The order to withdraw was a frustrating order to obey for the officers of the Cavalry Division, as they were already engaged in close action. The officers were sure that they could have defeated the Turks in this battle and blamed Crocker for the premature withdrawal. British cavalry casualties for the day totalled 69, of which 61 were incurred by the 7th Cavalry Brigade, and 8 by the 6th Cavalry Brigade, in addition to a number of horses lost.

=== Turkish Withdrawal ===
It was understood that if the XVIII Corps, with weak and exhausted units and without even sufficient fortifications having been prepared, continued to hold its defensive position at Sivri Devre it could find itself in a difficult situation, even facing destruction, against the British attacks that were known to continue on 26 February. Seeing this situation, the commander of the Sixth Army, Halil Pasha, ordered the XVIII Corps to withdraw to the Nahr al-Kalek position, which had been prepared 30 kilometers to the rear, in order to prevent further attrition. The Şevket Bey Detachment, left behind as rearguard, would protect and direct the withdrawal, and the 51st, 52nd, and 45th Divisions would begin withdrawing in that order.

British aeroplanes followed the retreating Turkish forces throughout the day, carrying out numerous attacks with Lewis guns and bombs. In total, they dropped ninety-four bombs on various targets, including shipping, with many of the attacks appearing effective. That evening, they achieved a clear success when the Turks attempted to tow their pontoon bridge upstream from Bughaila. Bombing from British aircraft caused the towing steamer to release its tow, resulting in the bridge boats drifting downstream.

=== Analysis ===
As can be understood from an analysis of the Battle of Sivri Devre, General Maude, by underestimating the weakened Turkish units that had been depleted in strength and by not committing the entire III Corps to the offensive, caused the Turkish reserves that were freed up to be shifted to the northern flank, where they succeeded in halting the British attacks, and thus made it possible to withdraw from the Sivri Devre to the Nahr Al-Kalek line. Nevertheless, the attack could be counted a British success in so far as it was the direct cause of the Turkish rearguard's abandoning their positions.

== Battle of Nahr Al-Kalek ==
=== Prelude ===
==== Turkish preparations ====
Considering the danger of being surrounded and destroyed from the northern flank of the Sivri Devre position, the Commander of the XVIII Corps, Colonel Kâzım Karabekir, decided to withdraw to the Nahr al-Kalek position west of Delabehe (Ümmüt-tabıl), which was being prepared 30 kilometers behind by the Depot Regiment. The XVIII Corps broke off the engagement at 03:00 on February 26, 1917, and began to withdraw from the Sivri Devre position, reaching the Nahr al-Kalek position at 11:00 on February 26, 1917. However, this position could also be surrounded from its northern flank. Moreover, its fortification had only recently begun and therefore it was not sufficiently prepared, and some areas had not even been explored.

Because the 15-kilometer-long position's northern flank was not anchored to any obstacle, it was vulnerable to being encircled by mobile units; the troops were therefore compelled to echelon their formation by bending their flank toward the northwest. As in the Sivri Devre position, the right flank was held by the 51st Division, while the left flank was held by the 52nd Division. The Şevket Bey Detachment and the 18th Cavalry Regiment were positioned in echelon behind the exposed flank, while the headquarters of the XVIII Corps was located west of Delabehe.

Located east of the position, The Semer Hill was held as an advanced outpost by the 3rd Battalion of the 43rd Regiment, reinforced by a battery. North of Semer Hill, the 18th Cavalry Regiment was deployed, sending out reconnaissance units, while the units in the advanced outpost were to withdraw to their positions at Nahr Al-Kalek in the event of a British attack.

=== Battle ===
==== Operations of the III Corps ====
At 21:25 on 25 February 1917, the commander of the British Expeditionary Force at Sinn telegraphed that Turkish units were deployed in depth between the rear guards in the Sivri Devre area and Bughaila. For the operation to be carried out on 26 February, the III Corps was to launch an attack with the support of all its available artillery, and the Cavalry Division was to proceed towards Bughaila by circling considerably to the north, while the I Corps was to continue its former task of clearing the area between Sannaiyat and Shumran. Following this directive, the commander of the III Corps decided that at 06:00 on February 26, 1917, the 13th Division would attack the Turkish units in the Sivri Devre area on the left and the 14th Division on the right, supported by all the artillery available in the corps. The cavalry division was also tasked with advancing from the north, seizing the Bughaila sector, and cutting off the Turkish units' rear lines; however, upon approaching the Sivri area, the 13th Division discovered that the Turkish forces had withdrawn and subsequently reported the situation to the corps headquarters.

The British forces continued their advance, encountering no opposition except for two Turkish aeroplanes that passed over. At 7:00 AM, a Turkish aircraft belonging to the 2nd Aviation Squadron was dispatched on a reconnaissance mission. Aerial reconnaissance revealed that two British infantry divisions were positioned opposite the left flank of the Ottoman positions in the Sivri Devre area.

By the time the troops of the 13th Division reached Sheikh Ja'ad at approximately 3:30 p.m., they were exhausted. A three-hour halt was ordered to allow the men to rest, wash, and eat before the march resumed in the cooler evening hours. Along the riverbank, the division passed three Turkish heavy guns that had been abandoned in shallow water. Meanwhile, the transport of the battalions had fallen behind, since the mules had to be watered in the river. Arab marauders were watching the march, and a party of the 9th Worcestershire Regiment that had been left to guard a small dump of tools was subsequently attacked. The small party fought a sharp engagement before the Arabs were driven off by other troops.

Advancing into action with the Cavalry Division to its north, the 14th Division likewise encountered no resistance from the Turkish forces. Moving rapidly through the Sivri Devre sector, the 6th Cavalry Brigade of the British Cavalry Division, reinforced by armored vehicles, reached the left flank of the Nahr al-Kalek position at 2:50 p.m. on 26 February 1917 and came under Turkish artillery fire at 3:00 p.m. The brigade's attack was halted behind the left flank of the Nahr al-Kalek position by the Şevket Bey Detachment, the Depot Regiment, the 18th Cavalry Regiment, and the 3rd Battalion of the 43rd Regiment, which had withdrawn from its advanced position on Semer Hill. Having suffered heavy losses, the British cavalry brigade remained opposite this newly formed position until sunset, before withdrawing at 6:15 p.m. to the area occupied by the Cavalry Division, 5 kilometres northwest of the Nahr al-Kalek sector.

==== Tigris Flotilla Operations ====
As reports arrived during the morning of February 26, General Maude realized the Turkish main body and rear guard had successfully evaded infantry and potentially cavalry pursuit. He requested the Senior Naval Officer to push forward with the flotilla to inflict maximum damage on the retreating Turks. Captain Wilfrid Nunn immediately proceeded upstream at full speed, with Tarantula (S.N.O.) leading, alongside Mantis and Moth, followed by Gadfly and Butterfly.

Passing Bughaila under white flags at 2 p.m., the flotilla overtook Turkish stragglers on the left bank, bringing in about 200 prisoners and some trench mortars. Commander Ernest K. Arbuthnot of the Gadfly hoisted the Union Jack over the town, while the stragglers surrendered and were directed back toward the advancing troops. The flotilla passed partly submerged Turkish guns and soon sighted the smoke of distant steamers. These included the Firefly (renamed Suliman Pak by the Turks) and the armed ship Pioneer. As they came within range, the British guns opened a heavy fire, to which both Turkish ships replied, with the Firefly engaging with her 4-inch gun.

Larger numbers of Turks retreating along the left bank were overtaken. As his ship approached the Nahr al-Kalek bend, Captain Nunn observed a large Turkish force positioned on the left bank at the head of the bend and ordered all guns to open fire. The Turkish rear guard was entrenched at the apex of the hairpin turn in the river. For several miles, the narrow channel exposed the ships to gun, machine-gun, and rifle fire from three directions at extremely short range. There was also a serious risk of grounding in the unfamiliar channel and blocking the fairway. Captain Nunn continued forward without hesitation, entering heavy fire while his ships replied with their full armament. Turkish fire, at ranges between one hundred and five hundred yards, caused significant casualties among British naval personnel, although British fire also inflicted considerable damage on the Turks.

The quartermaster and pilot in the conning tower of the Mantis were killed, though the rapid action of her commander prevented the vessel from running aground. The Moth, last in line, suffered the heaviest damage. Under the command of Lieutenant-Commander C. H. A. Cartwright, she was struck eight times by shellfire. One shell pierced a boiler and others holed the vessel below the waterline, while four of her five officers and half of her remaining complement were killed or wounded. Despite the damage, the ship remained underway. After passing the Turkish rear guard, the ships overtook the rear of the main Turkish force at very short range and opened rapid fire with every available weapon, causing heavy losses. The Turks appeared disorganized under the bombardment and made little attempt to return fire. Many gun crews were shot down, and several guns were abandoned and later captured by British infantry.

The Turkish vessels ahead were now within easy range for the British flotilla, and many stopped and surrendered, including the armed tug Sumana, captured by the Turks after the surrender of Kut. At about 5:20 p.m., the steamer Basra, carrying several hundred wounded Turks, a number of wounded British prisoners, and several unwounded Turks and Germans, stopped after a shell from the Tarantula and was run ashore under the direction of a wounded British officer. The Firefly continued firing for a short time but, after being struck several times, the Turkish crew set fire to her magazine and ran her aground. The fire was extinguished before it reached the magazine, and a British prize crew boarded the vessel and raised the White Ensign once again, only a few miles from the location where the ship had been lost fifteen months earlier. The Pioneer, set ablaze after a hit from the Mantis, and several ammunition barges were also abandoned nearby.

By this stage darkness was approaching, the gunboats had moved well ahead of the British infantry, and the main Turkish force was only just beyond range. Captain Nunn therefore decided not to advance further, and the flotilla anchored for the night. In this action Mantis lost 1 rating killed, 1 DOW, Moth, 2 ratings killed, Tarantula, 1 rating killed, no lives lost in Butterfly and Gadfly.

=== Turkish Withdrawal ===
Reports that the greater part of the British Cavalry Division was advancing north of Abu Halifiye towards Aziziya led the commander of the XVIII Corps to fear that the British would cut the corps' line of retreat in cooperation with the flotilla. Sharing these concerns and considering further resistance at the Nahr al-Kalek position inadvisable, Halil Pasha ordered a withdrawal towards Aziziya on 26 February 1917. He also placed the 33rd Cavalry Regiment under corps command, ordered the rapid transfer of the 11th Depot Regiment to Aziziya by steamer, and directed that the Diyala and Baghdad bridges be protected against possible British demolition attempts.

Muhammad Amin states that the Turkish XVIII Corps arrived at the Nahr al-Kalek bend on the morning of the 26th and occupied a pre-arranged position, although no entrenchments had been prepared there in advance. He continues:

"In the afternoon it (i.e. XVIII Corps) sustained the attack of the hostile cavalry on its left flank and rear and of the hostile river fleet on its right flank. The courageous attack of the British naval forces played havoc with the rear of the Corps. The Suliman Pak and Tugan gunboats and Kut al Amara motor boat were destroyed [sic]; 1,500 wounded, much equipment, the Basra river boat and about ten barges were either captured or destroyed. One force of hostile cavalry made for Aziziya, another enveloped the left flank and created great consternation in Corps Headquarters. The Commander realised that his communications would be cut and retired to Aziziya during the night 26th/27th February."

=== Consequences ===
The battle ended in a British victory. The naval action transformed the orderly withdrawal of the rear of the Turkish army into a panic-stricken rout, as became evident from the scene encountered by British aircraft and advancing troops the following morning. The road and surrounding area were reportedly strewn with dead and wounded men and animals, abandoned guns, weapons of all kinds, ammunition, wagons, and stores. In the rear, scattered groups of exhausted and starving men struggled along, some reportedly signalling to British aircraft for rescue from marauding Arabs.

== Aftermath ==
Since it was understood that the British Cavalry Division had not cut off the Baghdad road during the withdrawal, the Turkish troops continued their march, and the troops reached Aziziya on the morning of February 27, 1917 without encountering resistance. During the withdrawal, however, many wounded and straggling soldiers were left behind, together with abandoned equipment, rifles, and machine guns along the roads.

At 10:00 p.m. on February 26, 1917, General Maude issued an order stating that, if no Turks were present in the vicinity, the troops were to remain in place on February 27. If Turkish forces were encountered, however, the troops were to advance independently and take them prisoner. Before this order reached them, the Cavalry Division had already advanced towards Aziziya early on 27 February with a cavalry brigade. The brigade captured many Turkish soldiers who had been unable to keep pace with the withdrawal from the Nahr al-Kalek position, and it seized seven cannons together with abandoned equipment.

Despite this, General Maude issued another order at 10:30 a.m. on 27 February 1917, informing the cavalry brigade, which had advanced to within 10 kilometres of Aziziya, that it was not to advance further and should instead remain in its current position.

=== Consequences ===
From 23 to 28 February, 1917, British forces captured 38 guns, 19 trench mortars, 11 machine guns, three Turkish vessels, two tugs, ten barges, and thirty pontoons, and recaptured H.M.S. Firefly.

In a letter dated February 28, 1917, Maude wrote:

"Nothing could have been finer, and, as Sir Charles Monro said in his telegram to me, it will take a very high place in the records of the British Army. Since then we have been pushing on merrily. First the whole army was in pursuit, and then, as the infantry became less and less able to keep up with the flying enemy, the gunboats and Cavalry Division took it up, and they are still at it now. The enemy is absolutely demoralised and streaming away towards Baghdad in confusion, leaving guns, trench mortars, machine guns, rifles, ammunition, equipment, tents and stores of all kinds scattered along the road, whilst they have burnt and buried a certain amount. Then, on the river, the gunboats have captured quite a lot of shipping—four ships (including one of our gunboats which we lost in the retirement from Ctesiphon), launches, barges, mahalas, pontoons and a considerable amount of bridging material. The Turks have thrown some guns into the river, and altogether it is a complete rout. Since we started operations in December we have taken something like 7500 prisoners, including over 2500 yesterday, and this, added to the dead whom we have actually counted and buried, and allowing for a reasonable proportion of wounded, means—placing it at a low figure—that we have accounted for over three-quarters of the Turkish army which was opposed to us. Naturally the troops are delighted at their excellent performance, as they may well be."

Maude added that he had reliable information that the Turks did not intend to defend Baghdad. On February 28, 1917, the British Cabinet ordered that Maude was to press to Baghdad as quickly as possible. On March 3, Maude expressed his readiness:

"It was important to occupy Baghdad as early as possible. The Turks in front of him were no longer a fighting force owing to their casualties, losses and demoralization, and consequently we should be able to occupy Baghdad virtually without opposition; whereas if the enemy remained or regained possession we might have severe fighting before establishing ourselves there; and the Arabs would misinterpret hesitation on our part."

On March 4, 1917, Maude received final approval for an advance on Baghdad.

== Battle honours ==
=== John Readitt ===
One of the men who displayed notable bravery during the battle was Private John Readitt. An account in Empire News dated 8 July 1917 states that he was "the only survivor" of the first four bombing raids along the watercourse. It goes on to describe that during the fifth raid, Readitt had to rally the bombers who had scattered in the face of heavy enemy fire, and eventually he moved them up to the Turkish barricade, "which formed the main enemy position and was the chief obstacle to the advance".

Here the enemy counter-attacked, but in spite of the fact that the enemy concentrated on him a deadly fire and every sniper in the Turkish ranks seemed to be shooting at him, Readitt never abandoned his so-as-you-please style of retirement. Whenever the enemy pressed him too closely he would just turn and let them have a bomb, which scattered them in all directions.

Finally he was joined by another bombing party and then he made his most determined stand. Under his leadership, the bombers drove the enemy back once more, and after a fierce fight the whole position was captured and consolidated.

The Turkish commander whom we captured later in the day, said he had never seen anything finer than the way that stripling had stood up to a whole army.

John Readitt was awarded the Victoria Cross for his actions. The citation for this award reads as follows:

On 25 February 1917 at Alqayat-al-Gaharbigah Bend, Mesopotamia, Private Readitt advanced five times along a water-course in the face of heavy machine-gun fire at very close range, being the sole survivor on each occasion. These advances drove the enemy back and about 300 yards of the water-course was made good in an hour. After his officer had been killed, Private Readitt, on his own initiative, made several more advances. On reaching the enemy barricade he was forced to retire, but gave ground slowly continuing to throw bombs. When support reached him he held a forward bend by bombing until the position was consolidated.

== See also ==
- Fall of Baghdad (1917)
- Second Battle of Kut

== Bibliography ==
=== Journals ===
- Tunç, İrfan; Erol, Ertan (February 2016). "The Siege of Kut Al Amara on the 100th Anniversary and the Defeats of the British Relieving Force in Memories" (PDF). The Journal of International Social Research. 9 (42): 809–814. doi:10.17719/jisr.20164216191. ISSN 1307-9581.

=== Books ===
- Singh, Amarinder (2015). Honour and Fidelity: India's Military Contribution to the Great War 1914–1918. New Delhi: Lotus Collection. OCLC 897427199.
- Grehan, John; Mace, Martin (2014). The Royal Navy and the War at Sea, 1914–1919. United Kingdom: Pen & Sword Books.
- Barker, Arthur James (2009). The First Iraq War--1914-1918: Britain's Mesopotamian Campaign. New York: Enigma Books. ISBN 9780982491171.
- Majd, Mohammad Gholi (2006). Iraq in World War I: From Ottoman Rule to British Conquest. Lanham: University Press of America. OCLC 70159454.
- Ökse, Necati; Çalhan, Özden (2002). Birinci Dünya Harbi'nde Türk Harbi: Irak-İran Cephesi (1914–1918) [Turkish Fronts in the Great War: The Iraq-Iran Front (1914–1918)] (PDF). Genelkurmay Basımevi (in Turkish). Vol. 3. Ankara: Genelkurmay Askerî Tarih ve Stratejik Etüt Başkanlığı Yayınları.
- Anglesey, Marquess of (1995). A History of the British Cavalry, 1816–1919. Vol. 6. London: Leo Cooper. ISBN 9780850524338. LCCN 73008663. OCLC 317304167.
- Stacke, Henry FitzMaurice (1928). The Worcestershire Regiment in the Great War. G. T. Cheshire & Sons.
- Moberly, Frederick James (1925). The Campaign in Mesopotamia 1914–1918 Compiled at the Request of the Government of India, under the Direction of the Historical Section of the Committee of Imperial Defence. History of the Great War Based on Official Documents. Vol. III (1st ed.). London: HMSO. OCLC 772784343.
- Candler, Edmund (1919). The Long Road to Baghdad. Vol. 2. London: Cassel.
