= Battle of Istabulat =

1917 battle

- Part of the Mesopotamian campaign of World War I
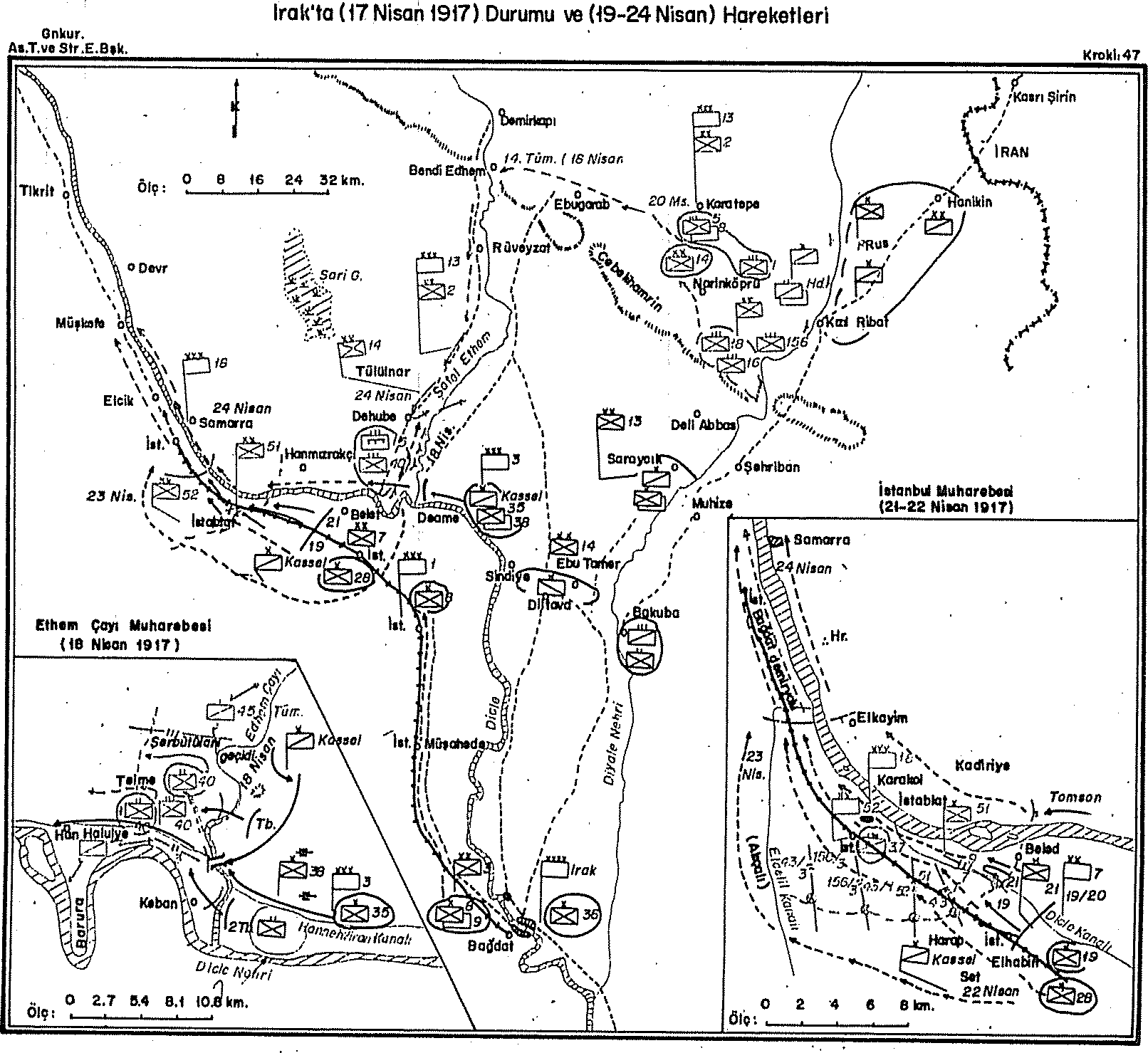
- Iraq Front Situation on April 17, 1917 and operations on April 19-24
Date	21 April 1917
Location	Istabulat, Ottoman Iraq 34.082°N 43.914°E
Result	British–Indian victory

Belligerents
British Empire: India; United Kingdom	Ottoman Empire

Commanders and leaders
Frederick Stanley Maude	Khalil Pasha

Units involved
7th (Meerut) Division and 8th (Jullundur) Brigade of 3rd (Lahore) Division	6th Army

Strength
45,000 Men (theater)	10,000 Men

Casualties and losses
~ 2,000	~ 2,000

The Battle of Istabulat was a part of the Samarra offensive during the First World War occurring when the British Empire attempted to further its strategic position after the capture of Baghdad from the Ottoman Empire.

== Background ==
After capturing Baghdad, British General Frederick Stanley Maude believed the British position was threatened by the Ottoman forces of Khalil Pasha, who possessed 10,000 troops to the north of Baghdad, and Ali Ishan Bey's force who commanded 15,000 troops entering the region from Persia. In order to protect British gains in the region, in particular Baghdad, General Maude ordered the Samarrah Offensive. To maintain British control of Baghdad, Maude outlined four objectives that needed to be met: Pasha's 6th Army needed to be driven north, the 8th Corps moving to join the 6th Army must be driven away or destroyed, the rail yard at Samarrah must be captured to prevent an Ottoman buildup of troops and munitions, and the British must secure the dams around Baghdad so that the Ottomans could not break them and flood the area.

== Prelude ==
=== Ottomans ===
The Engineer Battalion, 1.5 field batteries and the cavalry company of Ethem's Platoon arrived and took up positions south of Samarra on April 19. The 166th Infantry Regiment's crossing to the left bank took place today. The 1st Battalion of the 181st Infantry Regiment and the 7th Infantry Regiment arrived at Samarra station and completed their movement.

The commander of the 6th Army ordered the 18th Corps to move to the left coast with the bulk of the 18th Corps and stated that since the 166th and 181st Infantry regiments were still untested, he hoped that these forces would be utilized on the left coast. The army commander also requested that Lieutenant Colonel Ali Vehbi Bey, the 181st Infantry Regiment Commander, who was so far behind that he was separated from his regiment, be immediately detained and, if he was found to be treasonous and treacherous, he should be referred to the Court of War and executed.

18th Corps Deputy Commander Colonel Galatalı Şevket Bey had proposed to the army commander on April 20 that if his corps withdrew to Tikrit, it would be useless for the 13th Corps to stay on the Bent Ethem-Shirankale line, and that it would be convenient for the command and administration of this corps, which was short of food, to gather at the Tigris, where most of the army was located. The reason for the corps commander's concern was that if the 18th Corps retreated further north, the 13th Corps would have to retreat northward in parallel, thus cutting off communication and cooperation due to the widening distance between the two corps. The 13th Corps, which was suffering from food shortages, would be in an even more difficult situation. Upon this proposal made by the commander of the 18th Corps to the army, the army wanted to know the thoughts of the commander of the 13th Corps. The 13th Corps' proposal was very short.

If 18th Corps withdraws to Tikrit, 13th Corps may stop at the Shirvankale-Bent Ethem line. The corps reserve may also withdraw as far south as Kifri. The 14th Division could then move to Samarra via Imam Dur.

— 13th Corps' proposal - 1917

The 13th Corps commander also stated in this proposal to the army that he could make a demonstration attack with his corps from Jabeli Hamrin to Merfu Kale (the British 13th Division was located in this area) in order to mislead the enemy. The corps commander reminded the army that the corps relief force could not reach Bent Ethem before seven days and that the corps troops had only four days' rations. Without waiting for the army's response, Colonel Şevket Bey dispatched the 16th Infantry Regiment in Deliabbas in the direction of the Arab village. The regiment advanced towards the hills 74 kilometers north of Saraycık. However, while the 16th Regiment was marching in the direction of Merfu Kale, news was received that the 40th Regiment had been captured by the enemy. After the Ethem Stream Detachment (40th Infantry Regiment) was captured by the British and the British forces were massing forces in Istablad, the army asked the 13th Corps to send a division-level unit to Ethem Stream. The relief force requested from the 13th Corps was composed of the following units:

13th Corps headquarters;

- 5th Infantry Regiment (belonging to the 2nd Division),
- 6th Infantry Regiment (belonging to the 2nd Division),
- Two battalions of the 18th Infantry Regiment (belonging to the 6th Division),
- 33rd Cavalry Regiment.

The task of this force was to influence the right flank of the British west of the Shatulethem, thus providing assistance to the 18th Corps. The 13th Corps issued its famous Order No. 78 and completed its preparations for this adventure on April 20.

The 13th Corps left the Cavalry Brigade under the command of Colonel Nazif (Kayacık) Bey (Major General in the Republican period), Commander of the 6th Division, and the 1st Regiment of the 2nd Division, the 16th Infantry Regiment of the 6th Division and the 1st Battalion of the 18th Regiment in contact with the enemy around Suhaniye and Narin Bridge for the protection and defense of Jabal Hamrin. The Diyala front was to be defended as before by the 156th Infantry Regiment at Kizribat. The troops at Jabeli Hamrin were to be withdrawn to the Kara Tepe ridges in case of serious enemy pressure. The commanders of the 1st Infantry Regiment and the cavalry brigade were likewise authorized to withdraw 20 kilometers east of Kifri in case of difficulty. The 14th Division arrived today (April 19, 1917) in the Ruweirzat area, 7 kilometers south of Bent Ethem, and went into camp. The division had arrived here on April 18 after a laborious march via Sarha-Ebu Garab. For its own safety, the division first moved the 3rd Battalion of the 37th Infantry Regiment, reinforced with cavalry and artillery, to the west bank of the Ethem stream. This platoon was to protect the bulk of the division against threats from the west by marching along the opposite bank during the division's movement south.

After the 13th Corps commander's last report stating that it was not possible for relief forces to reach Bent Ethem before seven days and that the corps had a four-day supply of provisions, the commander of the 6th Army abandoned the Ethem stream operation and notified the corps with an order on April 20. However, it was too late. The 13th Corps had already begun the offensive in large part. The corps commander ignored this order, considering that frequent changes of orders would not yield good results on the already demoralized soldiers, and announced that he would continue the operation. The 2nd Division moved from Narin Bridge to Bent Ethem on the same date. The division was scheduled to reach the village of Tulistan on April 22. The 14th Division was unable to reach Bent Ethem from the village of Ali Veli due to the unevenness of the road, and had to go around the north of the village to reach Rüveyzat instead of Bend Ethem.

=== British ===
The main British force advanced along both sides of the Tigris river. On 17 April, the British pushed the Ottomans out of their trenches on the Adhaim river. This was a successful operation for the British as they suffered few casualties while capturing 1,200 Ottoman soldiers. On 18 April, the Black Watch pushed forward a patrol along the east bank of the Dujail scouting the Ottoman position at Istabulat. The 28th Punjabis did the same on the west bank. On 19 April, the Black Watch Battalion drove the enemy advance troops back with little loss. During the night the British built three strong posts a mile in advance, two on the east and one on the west bank of the Dujail. The Ottomans felt it was needed to contest this advance as if the rail yard at Samarrah was lost the Ottomans would lose to ability to bring in reinforcements effectively to the region.

== Battle of Istabulat ==
The assault on the Ottoman position at Istabulat started on the morning of 21 April with the 92nd Punjabis advancing on Istabulat station. They successfully took the position by assault and dug themselves in in front of the main position, half a mile beyond the Ottoman trenches. At 6.30 a.m. the Black Watch and Gurkhas reached the foot of the high ridge, where the enemy lay waiting for the assault. The Gurkhas and Black Watch reached their objectives almost at the same moment. The Gurkhas took nearly 200 prisoners in the north redoubt, where the enemy's resistance was not as heavy as elsewhere. But in the Dujail Redoubt the Turks resistance was more effective. The Black Watch had cleared this strong point at 6.45 a.m. The Turks quickly reorganized their forces and counter-attacked. Through this attack they reoccupied the greater part of the position. They were pushed out of the position by the Highlanders at 7.15 a.m. The redoubt firmly returned to British hands. The Highlanders paid a heavy price losing 10 officers and 173 enlisted in this engagement. The Ottomans ordered several counterattacks along the banks of the Dujail, and it was not until after 2 hours of hand to-hand fighting that the north bank was secured by the British. The 9th Bhopals attempted a flanking movement but overshot their objective and came under fire from the banks of the Dujail. Two hundred fell, including the officers but one, Jemadar Jai LaL of Rohtak won the I.O.M. (Ist Class) by rallying the regiment on this occasion. South of the canal one company of the 28th Punjabis advanced in line with the 21st (Bareilly) Brigade. The Seaforths on their left launched their attack some three hours later and drove the enemy from his first-line trench. The intention in pressing in first on the right with the 21st Brigade was to give the Ottomans a line of retreat to the left to distract his attention as much as possible from the troops who had to advance over more open ground. But the Ottoman position held out all day, and it was not until early on the morning of the 22nd that the Ottomans withdrew from their position.

== Aftermath ==
Turkish forces were forced to surrender the Samarrah Rail Yard to British forces, ending their chance of retaking a dominant strategic position in the region. At the Battle of Istabulat, each side suffered approximately 2,000 killed. British casualties in the Sammarrah offensive as a whole were estimated at around 18,000 men, although a further 37,000 men were lost to sickness. The Ottoman Empire lost about 15,000 men in the campaign, destroying the Ottoman 6th army. Two Victoria Cross were awarded to John Reginald Graham and Charles Melvin for their actions at Istabulat.
