= Iraq Area Command (Ottoman Empire) =

Iraq Area Command Irak ve Havalisi Genel Komutanlığı
- Active: August 26, 1914 – April 19, 1916
- Country: Ottoman Empire
- Type: Corps-Army
- Garrison/HQ: Basra, Baghdad
- Patron: Sultans of the Ottoman Empire
- Engagements: Mesopotamian campaign Fao Landing; Battle of Basra; Battle of Qurna; Battle of Es Sinn; Battle of Ctesiphon; Siege of Kut; Sheikh Sa'ad; Battle of Wadi; Battle of Hanna; Battle of Dujaila

Commanders
- Notable commanders: Cavit Pasha (August 26, 1914 – January 20, 1915; Kaymakam Süleyman Askerî Bey (December 20, 1914/January 20, 1915 – April 14, 1915); Miralay Nureddin Bey (April 20, 1915 – January 10, 1916); Miralay Halil Bey (January 10 – April 19, 1916)

The Iraq Area Command or Iraq Regional Command of the Ottoman Empire (Turkish: Irak ve Havalisi Genel Komutanlığı) was one of the military formation of the Ottoman Army. It was formed in Ottoman Iraq in the initial stage of World War I.

== Formations ==
=== Order of Battle, November 1914 ===
In November 1914, the corps was structured as follows:

- Iraq Area Command (Commander: Cavit Pasha)
  - 38th Division

=== Order of Battle, January 1915 ===
In January 1918, the corps was structured as follows:

- Iraq Area Command (Commander: Kaymakam Süleyman Askerî Bey)
  - 38th Division
  - Sahrıca Detachment (Provisional Dicle Division since January 25, 1915)
  - Kerha Group
  - Fırat Group

Because Süleyman Askerî Bey committed suicide on April 14, 1915, Nureddin Bey was appointed the commander on April 20. Nureddin Bey arrived in June to take command of the Iraq Area Command and he was appointed the Governor of Basra Province and Baghdad Province at the same time. On December 21, 1915, German Generalfeldmarschall Colmar von der Goltz arrived at Baghdad and changed the name of the Command as the Iraq Army (Irak Ordusu).

=== Order of Battle, Late 1915 ===
In late 1915, the corps was structured as follows:

- Iraq Area Command (Commander: Miralay Nureddin Bey)
  - XIII Corps
    - 35th Division, 38th Division
  - XVIII Corps (Commander: Miralay Halil Bey)
    - 45th Division, 51st Division
