= Sixth Army (Ottoman Empire) =

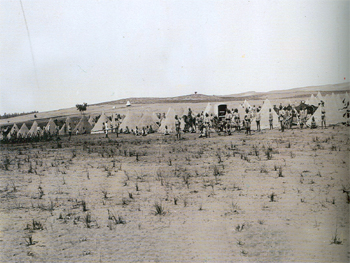
- Sixth Army field HQ
- Active: September 5, 1915–February 9, 1919
- Country: Ottoman Empire
- Type: Field Army
- Garrison/HQ: Baghdad
- Patron: Sultans of the Ottoman Empire
- Engagements: Mesopotamian campaign (World War I)

Commanders
- Notable commanders: Müşir Goltz Pasha (October 13, 1915-April 19, 1916); Mirliva Halil Pasha (April 19, 1916-June 30, 1918); Mirliva Ali İhsan Pasha (June 30, 1918-February 9, 1919)

The Sixth Army of the Ottoman Empire (Turkish: Altıncı Ordu) was one of the field armies of the Ottoman Army. It was formed in the middle 19th century during Ottoman military reforms.

== Formations ==
=== Order of Battle, 1877 ===
In 1877, it was stationed in Baghdad in Ottoman Iraq. It was composed of:

- Infantry: Six line regiments and six rifle battalion.
- Cavalry: Two line regiments.
- Artillery: One line regiment (9 batteries).
- Engineer: One sapper company.

=== Order of Battle, 1908 ===
After the Young Turk Revolution and the establishment of the Second Constitutional Era on July 3, 1908, new government initiate a major military reform. Army headquarters were modernized. Its operational area was Mesopotamia. It commanded the following active divisions: The Sixth Army also had inspectorate functions for four Redif (reserve) divisions:

- Sixth Army
  - 11th Infantry Division (On Birinci Fırka)
  - 12th Infantry Division (On İkinci Fırka)
  - 6th Infantry Division (Altıncı Fırka)
  - 15th Artillery Brigade (On Beşinci Topçu Tugayı)
- Redif divisions of the Sixth Army (name of the division denotes its location)
  - 21st Baghdad Reserve Infantry Division (Yirmi Birinci Bağdad Redif Fırkası)
  - 22nd Basra Reserve Infantry Division (Yirmi İkinci Basra Redif Fırkası)
  - 23rd Kelkit Reserve Infantry Division (Yirmi Üçüncü Kelkit Redif Fırkası)
  - 24th Musul Reserve Infantry Division (Yirmi Dördüncü Musul Redif Fırkası)

== World War I ==
=== Order of Battle, August 1914 ===
In August 1914, the army was structured as follows:

- Sixth Army (Commander: Cavit Pasha)
  - XII Corps
    - 35th Division, 36th Division
  - XIII Corps
    - 37th Division

=== Order of Battle, Late April 1915 ===
In late April 1915, the army was structured as follows:

- Sixth Army
  - 35th Division
  - Provisional Infantry Division

=== Order of Battle, Late Summer 1915 ===
In late Summer 1915, the army was structured as follows:

- Sixth Army
  - Iraq Area Command
    - XIII Corps
      - 35th Division, 38th Division
    - XVIII Corps
      - 45th Division

=== Order of Battle, January 1916 ===
In January 1916, the army was structured as follows:

- Sixth Army
  - Iraq Area Command
    - XIII Corps
      - 35th Division, 52nd Division
    - XVIII Corps
      - 45th Division, 51st Division

=== Order of Battle, August 1916 ===
In August 1916, the army was structured as follows:

- XIII Corps
  - 2nd Division, 4th Division, 6th Division
- XVIII Corps
  - 35th Division, 45th Division, 51st Division, 52nd Division

=== Order of Battle, December 1916 ===
In December 1916, the army was structured as follows:

- XIII Corps
  - 2nd Division, 4th Division, 6th Division
- XVIII Corps
  - 45th Division, 51st Division, 52nd Infantry Division

=== Order of Battle, August 1917, January 1918, June 1918 ===
In August 1917, January, June 1918, the army was structured as follows:

- XIII Corps
  - 2nd Division, 6th Division
- XVIII Corps
  - 14th Division, 51st Division, 52nd Division
- 46th Division

=== Order of Battle, September 1918 ===
In September 1918, the army was structured as follows:

- XIII Corps
  - 2nd Division, 6th Division
- XVIII Corps
  - 14th Division, 46th Division

== After Mudros ==
=== Order of Battle, November 1918 ===
In November 1918, the army was structured as follows:

- XIII Corps
  - 2nd Division, 6th Division
