= XVIII Corps (Ottoman Empire) =

XVIII Corps On Sekizinci Kolordu
- Active: 1912-1913; June 7, 1915 (as the Right Wing Group of the Third Army)– September 20, 1915 (as the XVIII Corps)-
- Country: Ottoman Empire
- Type: Corps
- Engagements: Mesopotamian campaign (World War I)

Commanders
- Notable commanders: Miralay Mehmet Ali Bey; Miralay Halil Bey; Miralay Kâzım Karabekir Bey (April 27, 1916-April 8, 1917); Miralay Galatalı Şevket Bey

The XVIII Corps of the Ottoman Empire (Turkish: 18 nci Kolordu or On Sekizinci Kolordu) was one of the corps of the Ottoman Army. It was formed during World War I.

== Balkan Wars ==
=== Order of Battle, October 29, 1912 ===
On October 29, 1912, the corps was structured as follows:

- XVIII Provisional Corps (Thrace, under the command of the Second Eastern Army)
  - Yozgat Redif Division, Ankara Redif Division, Aydin Redif Division

== World War I ==
=== Order of Battle, June 1915 ===
The corps was formed as the Right Wing Group of the Mahmut Kâmil Pasha's Third Army on June 7, 1915 and commanded by Halil Bey. In a rearrangement of operational field commands, Mahmut Kâmil Pasha redesigned this unit as the Provisional Halil Corps.

- Right Wing Group (Caucasus, Commander: Kaymakam Halil Bey -> Mirliva Abdülkerim Pasha since July 19, 1915)
  - 1st Expeditionary Force (Commander: Kaymakam Ali İhsan Bey)
  - 5th Expeditionary Force (Commander: Kaymakam Bekir Sami Bey)
  - 36th Division (Commander: Kaymakam Köprülü Kâzım Bey)

=== Order of Battle, Late Summer 1915 ===
On September 20, 1915, the Provisional Halil Corps was re-designated as the XVIII Corps of the Ottoman Army. In late Summer 1915, the corps was structured as follows:

- XVIII Corps (Mesopotamia)
  - 45th Division

=== Order of Battle, January 1916 ===
In January 1916, the corps was structured as follows:

- XVIII Corps (Mesopotamia)
  - 45th Division, 51st Division

=== Order of Battle, August 1916 ===
In August 1916, the corps was structured as follows:

- XVIII Corps (Mesopotamia)
  - 35th Division, 45th Division, 51st Division, 52nd Division

=== Order of Battle, December 1916 ===
In December 1916, the corps was structured as follows:

- XVIII Corps (Mesopotamia)
  - 45th Division, 51st Division, 52nd Division

=== Order of Battle, August 1917, January 1918 ===
In August 1917, January 1918, the corps was structured as follows:

- XVIII Corps (Mesopotamia)
  - 14th Division, 51st Division, 52nd Division

=== Order of Battle, September 1918 ===
In November 1918, the corps was structured as follows:

- XVIII Corps (Mesopotamia)
  - 14th Division, 46th Division
