= Lanham =

Lanham may refer to:

== Places ==
In the United States:

- Lanham, Kansas and Nebraska
- Lanham, Maryland
- Lanham-Seabrook, Maryland, former census-designated place

== Other uses ==
- Lanham (surname)
- Lanham Act
