= Samarra offensive =

Offensive of the Mesopotamian campaign

- Part of the Mesopotamian campaign
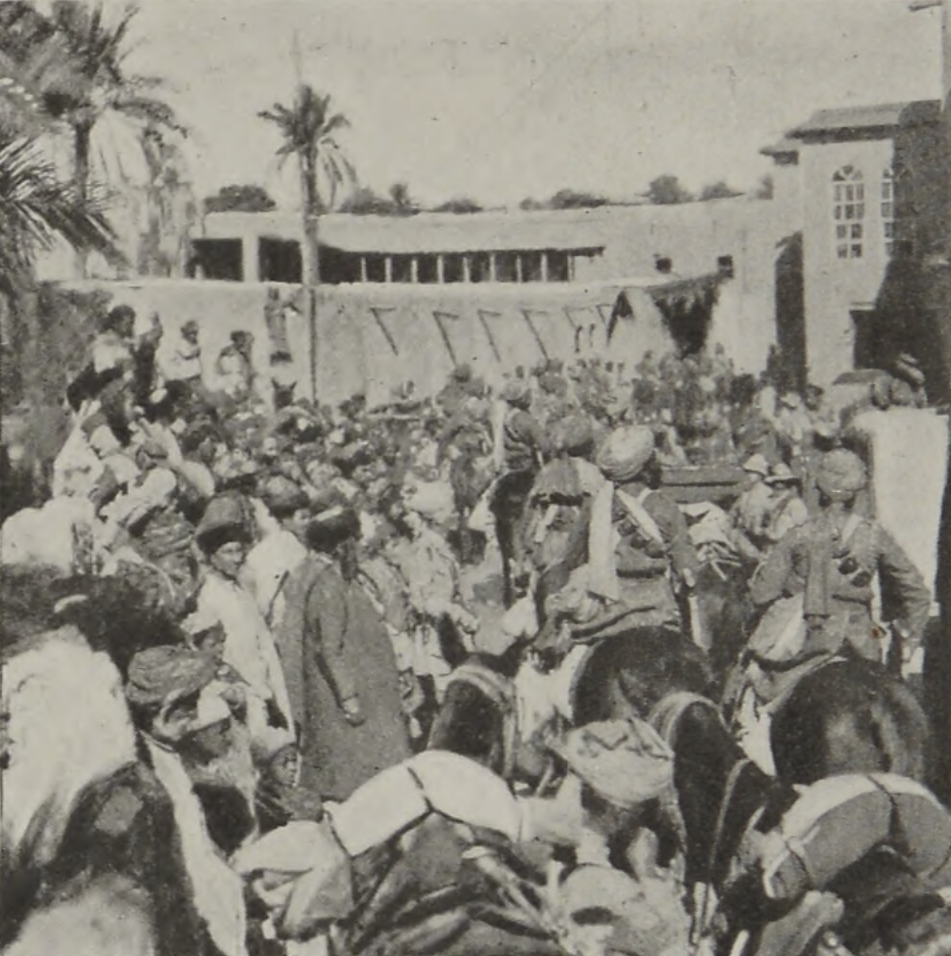
- Indian cavalry entering Khanaqin, April 1917
Date	March 13 – April 23, 1917
Location	North of Baghdad, Ottoman Iraq
Result	British victory

Belligerents
British Empire: India; United Kingdom	Ottoman Empire

Commanders and leaders
(United Kingdom of Great Britain and Ireland) Stanley Maude	(Ottoman Empire) Khalil Pasha, (Ottoman Empire) Ali İhsan Sâbis

Strength
45,000	10,000 (Khalil), 15,000 (Ali Ishan)

Casualties and losses
18,000 (+ 37,000 sick)	4,000

The Samarra offensive (March 13 – April 23, 1917) was launched by the British against the Ottomans as part of the Mesopotamian campaign in Ottoman Iraq during World War I. After Baghdad fell to the British on March 11, 1917, there were still 10,000 Ottoman troops north of the city, led by Khalil Pasha, who could represent a threat to Anglo-Indian forces.

Furthermore, another 15,000 Ottomans under Ali Ihsan Bey were being driven out of Persia by the Russians, and were attempting at joining Khalil's forces in northern Iraq. The British commander, Stanley Maude, decided that, in order to avert these threats, he had to take control of the Samarrah railroad, running 130 km (81 mi) north of Baghdad.

Operations began on March 13, carried forth by 45,000 British troops. On March 19, they conquered Fallujah, a crucial step toward the offensive's goal. The British continued their attacks until April 23, when the town of Samarrah and its railroad fell into their hands. Although it achieved its aims, the Samarrah offensive cost the British about 18,000 casualties, a considerable price (plus another 38,000 who were taken ill).
