= Bekir Sami Bey =

Bekir Sami Bey may refer to:

- Bekir Sami Kunduh (1867–1933), foreign minister of the government of the Grand National Assembly
- Bekir Sami Günsav (1879–1934), officer of the Ottoman Army and a commander of the Turkish War of Independence
- Bekir Sami Daçe, Turkish politician, one of the founding members of the Right Path Party
