= Capture of Fallujah (1917) =

1917 Capture of Fallujah

- Part of the Samarra offensive during the Mesopotamian campaign of World War I
Date	19 March 1917
Location	Fallujah, Ottoman Iraq 33°21′13″N 43°46′46″E
Result	British victory

Belligerents
British Empire; British Raj	Ottoman Empire

Commanders and leaders
S.R. Davidson	Halil Kut

Strength
	200–2,000

Casualties and losses
25 casualties	13 prisoners
- Location within Iraq

The Capture of Fallujah (Note: Turkish: İngilizlerin Felluce'yi Ele Geçirmesi) (19 March 1917) was a brief and strategic military engagement during the Mesopotamian campaign of World War I, where a British brigade successfully seized the town of Fallujah from a small Ottoman garrison.

Forming a crucial component of the Samarra offensive, the seizure of Fallujah ensured that Sir Frederick Stanley Maude's Anglo-Indian force would not have to cope with flooding of the Euphrates plains during their advance further north from Baghdad. Falluja, to the west of Baghdad, formed a flood-control area around the Euphrates River. Garrisoned only by a small force, it was handily seized by a British brigade on 19 March 1917, six days after Baghdad fell to the British.

However, the retreating Turkish force took care to seriously damage the dams protecting floodplains further south. The problem could have been a serious one for the British, but for the fact that the Euphrates was currently low, although repair work was hampered by attacks from local Marsh Arabs, who attacked both sides equally, without prejudice. Once repair work—which occupied several days—was completed, the British force was able to rejoin the main offensive.

== History ==
=== Prelude ===
On 11 March, General Maude issued orders for the 1st Corps to advance a brigade group to Nukhta on the road to Fallujah the following day. However, on the morning of the 12th, the order was canceled and replaced with instructions to send a reconnaissance party on the 13th to determine whether sufficient water was available there.

Information received on the 13th indicated that the Turkish force from the Euphrates had probably already reached Fallujah and intended to cut the flood embankments at the mouth of the Sakhlawiya Canal. By evening, reports confirmed that Nukhta held only enough water for roughly a brigade. In any case, supply and transport difficulties made it impossible to dispatch a separate column to Fallujah in addition to the force already advancing to attack the Turks at Mushahida.

On 14 March, British airplanes reported that only two small enemy steamers were operating within ten miles of Fallujah, and that no more than about 200 enemy troops had been observed in the area. By the 16th, it had become clear that few, if any, Turkish forces remained within fifty miles of Baghdad along the Tigris, and that the embankments had been secured for thirty miles north of the city. General Maude therefore ordered the 1st Corps to dispatch a brigade group to Fallujah on the 18th to hold the town and protect the Sakhlawiya embankment.

On the morning of 17 March, reports suggested that the Turkish force near Fallujah might number as many as 2,000 cavalry and infantry supported by three guns. In response, General Cobbe was instructed to reinforce the Fallujah column with two howitzers in addition to an 18-pounder battery. By the evening, news that floodwater from Lake Aqarquf had advanced to within four and a half miles of Kadhimain confirmed that the Turks had likely cut the Sakhlawiya embankment. Protective measures had already been put in place, however, and the 1st Corps, assisted by technical troops and local labor, strengthened a defensive line running from the Tigris above Kadhimain along the railway embankment and the Mahsudiya Canal.

=== Operations ===
==== Occupation of Nukhta (18 March 1917) ====
Early on 18 March, a column under Brigadier-General Sisley Richard Davidson (1869–1952) set out for Nukhta. It consisted of a squadron of the 32nd Lancers, 66th Field Battery, a section of the 524th Howitzer Battery, the 21st Company Sappers and Miners, the 7th Infantry Brigade, and a company of the 34th Sikh Pioneers, supported by a pack wireless set and medical and supply units.

An advance party, which had departed three hours ahead to improve the water supply, exchanged a brief fire with a Turkish patrol near Nukhta. Apart from this encounter, the column met no resistance, and an ample supply of good water was secured from an irrigation canal recently opened by local Arabs.

==== Skirmish East of Fallujah (18 March 1917) ====
After arriving at the village of Fallujah, the Ottoman group commander ordered the Cavalry Regiment to conduct reconnaissance and maintain observation along the Baghdad route, which led the regiment to dispatch one company toward Baghdad.

When the British advance resumed the following morning on March 18, the 32nd Lancers encountered these enemy mounted troops about four miles (six kilometers) east of Fallujah along the Baghdad–Fallujah road. The Ottoman company engaged the vanguard of the British cavalry regiment in a dismounted skirmish, but the Ottoman force was unable to advance after coming under the reconnaissance fire of the British cavalry artillery. Forced to withdraw before the British advance, the Ottoman company retreated to rejoin its regiment positioned six kilometers east of Fallujah.

After the Ottoman cavalry unit, unable to withstand the superior British cavalry, withdrew from its position, British forces of various formations advanced toward Fallujah at 9:00. They moved through a section where the river formed a two-kilometer indentation, an area crossed by several old canals. Large mounds of rubble in this sector provided the British with covered approaches, allowing them to advance under concealment.

==== Capture of Fallujah (19 March 1917) ====
The following day, at 11:00, the 1st Battalion of the 64th Regiment joined the Ottoman detachment. British reconnaissance had indicated that the Turkish force, estimated at brigade strength, had prepared trenches covering Fallujah. However, the Turks made no serious attempt to hold their position. By 12:15, fifteen minutes after the British attack began, the cessation of firing and smoke rising from Fallujah showed that the Turkish troops were already retreating.

The British force advancing on Fallujah was estimated to comprise two infantry brigades and one cavalry brigade. In reality, the defensive position selected for Fallujah had been hastily prepared and was inadequate for sustaining a serious engagement. Moreover, after an unsuccessful battle, crossing the turbulent Euphrates River appeared impossible. For this reason, at 14:00, the Ottoman group commander ordered the fighting to cease and began withdrawing the detachment to the right bank. Once all units of the group had crossed the river, the Fallujah Bridge was burned.

General Davidson then sent his cavalry ahead to secure the Sakhlawiya Canal while advancing with the main force. The British were able to pursue only as far as the Sakhlawiya embankment, where a brief engagement caused heavy losses among the British elite cavalry. After withdrawing from the immediate pursuit, the British began shelling Fallujah at 14:30. Half an hour later, they advanced to the village, entered Fallujah at 15:15, and prevented the complete destruction of the bridge over the Euphrates. They then opened fire, at a range of about 1,200 yards, on a substantial body of Turkish troops retreating along the right bank, including the Ottoman rear-guard cavalry squadron, which formed the last echelon of the detachment.

==== Skirmish West of Sakhlawiya (19 March 1917) ====
At 17:00, the Ottoman troops, under the direction of the column commander, began retreating toward Ramadi. At the same time, British cavalry reached the Sakhlawiya sluice gates and learned that Turkish guns were positioned on the riverbank slightly farther west, while a Turkish gunboat was moving upstream towing a coracle filled with troops. Hoping to capture it, two cavalry troops took up positions along the riverbank and opened rifle fire at a range of 150 yards. The gunboat replied with shrapnel fire. Realizing the position could not be held, the cavalry commander ordered a withdrawal. During the retreat, the squadron was attacked by local Arabs and escaped only with difficulty, suffering 25 casualties. The main British column, however, incurred no losses. At Fallujah, it captured thirteen prisoners, a steam barge, a damaged launch, and a considerable quantity of supplies.

=== Aftermath ===
On the morning of 20 March, a British detachment occupied the mouth of the Sakhlawiya Canal without encountering opposition. The breach in the embankment, reportedly created by the Turks a fortnight earlier, proved too extensive to repair. The detachment remained in position there, while the main body of the column held Fallujah and maintained a bridgehead on the right bank of the river. Once repair work—which occupied several days—was completed, the British force was able to rejoin the main offensive.

== Bibliography ==
- Moberly, F. J. (1925). The Campaign in Mesopotamia 1914–1918 Compiled at the Request of the Government of India, under the Direction of the Historical Section of the Committee of Imperial Defense. History of the Great War Based on Official Documents. Vol. III (1st ed.). London: HMSO. OCLC 772784343.
- Birinci Dünya Harbi: cilt. Irak-Iran cephesi, 1914-1918. (1-2. kısım.) (in Turkish). T.C., Genelkurmay Başkanlığı Harp Tarihi Dairesi. 2002.
