= 5th Expeditionary Force (Ottoman Empire) =

5th Expeditionary Force Beşinci Kuvve-i Seferiye
- Active: December 1914 – 20 September 1915
- Country: Ottoman Empire
- Allegiance: Ottoman Army
- Type: Expeditionary Force
- Patron: Sultans of the Ottoman Empire
- Engagements: World War I: Caucasus Campaign

Commanders
- Notable commanders: Kaymakam Halil Bey; Kaymakam Bekir Sami Bey

The 5th Expeditionary Force (Turkish: Beşinci Kuvve-i Seferiye) of the Ottoman Empire was one of the expeditionary forces of the Ottoman Army.

== Order of battle ==
In December 1914, the 5th Expeditionary Force was structured as follows:

- 5th Expeditionary Force HQ (commander: Kaymakam Halil Bey)
  - 7th Infantry Regiment (13th Division, Ankara)
  - 9th Infantry Regiment (14th Division, Daday)
  - 44th Infantry Regiment (15th Division, Yozgat)
  - 3rd Battalion (Mountain Howitzer) (10th Artillery Regiment, Ankara)
  - 10th Artillery Regiment
