= Türkische Post =

German language daily newspaper in Turkey (1926–1944)

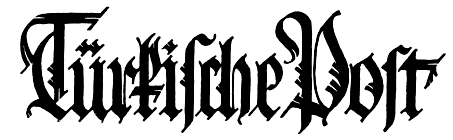
- Type: Daily newspaper
- Founded: 1926
- Ceased publication: 28 July 1944
- Language: German
- Headquarters: Istanbul
- Country: Turkey

Türkische Post was a German language daily newspaper published in Istanbul, Turkey. The daily was in circulation between 1926 and 1944 with some interruptions.

== History and profile ==
Türkische Post was launched in 1926 and had its headquarters in Istanbul. Its original aim was to revive and improve the relations between the Republic of Turkey and Germany. The daily was financed by the German foreign ministry. The German ambassador to Turkey, Rudolf Nadolny, was instrumental in the establishments of the paper which mostly carried news about Turkey and Bulgaria. The founding director was Franz Frederik Schmidt-Dumont who worked in the paper until 1934. The mission of Türkische Post significantly changed from 1933 when the National Socialist German Workers' Party became the ruling party in Germany in that the paper began to be used as a Nazi propaganda tool.

In 1934 a Turkish retired army officer, General Ali İhsan Sabis, replaced Franz Frederik Schmidt-Dumont as the director of the daily. The contributors were both German and Turkish journalists, including Herrmann von Ritgen, Franz von Caucig, Hans Joseph Lazar, Herbert W. Duda, Ahmet Ağaoğlu and Peyami Safa.

Türkische Post was temporarily suspended two times: between 29 March and 1 May 1940, and between 17 February and 11 April 1944. The paper was closed by the Turkish authorities due to its extensive support for the Nazi government. The last issue was numbered 144 which was published on 28 July 1944.

Some of the issues were digitized by the Berlin State Library in 2008.
