= Fao Landing =

1914 battle in Mesopotamia during World War I

- Part of the Mesopotamian campaign of the First World War
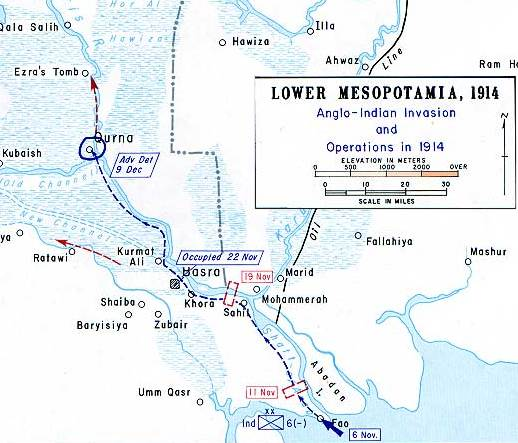
- Map showing the initial British attack and capture of Basra, 1914.
Date	6–8 November 1914
Location	Al-Faw, Ottoman Iraq 29°55′41″N 48°27′58″E
Result	British victory

Belligerents
British Empire; United Kingdom; India	Ottoman Empire

Commanders and leaders
Walter Delamain	(Vali of Baghdad) Javi Pasha

Units involved
1 Brigade; Landing party Royal Marines	Elements of 38th Division; Iraq Area Command

Casualties and losses
Light, including one officer	300 captured; 135 dead

The Fao Landing occurred from 6 November to 8 November 1914 with British forces attacking the Ottoman stronghold of Fao and its fortress. The landing was met with little resistance from the Ottoman defenders who fled after intense shelling. It was the first military operation of the Mesopotamian Campaign, during the First World War, which was carried out to protect British oil supplies in the Persian Gulf.

== Background ==
When the Ottoman Empire entered into World War I, the British feared for the safety of the Persian Gulf oil facilities. To protect their facilities, the British decided to capture the Ottoman-controlled section of the Persian Gulf coast. The Fortress of Fao was the main Ottoman fortress on the Persian Gulf coast and to British commanders seemed like the logical jumping off point for any Ottoman attack on British oil facilities. The 6th (Poona) Division (Lieutenant-General Arthur Barrett), with Sir Percy Cox as Political Officer was ordered to prepare for field service in France as part of Indian Expeditionary Force A.

On 4 October the division was ordered to prepare the 16th Indian Brigade (Brigadier-General Walter Delamain) for service to begin on 10 October, consisting of the 2nd Battalion, Dorsetshire Regiment, the 1st Battalion, 104th Wellesley's Rifles, the 1st Battalion, 117th Mahrattas and the 1st Battalion, 20th Duke of Cambridge's Own Infantry (Brownlow's Punjabis), accompanied by the 22 Company, 3rd Sappers and Miners, the 1st Indian Mountain Artillery Brigade with the 23rd (Peshawar) Mountain Battery (Frontier Force) and 30th Mountain Battery and medical, supply and transport units.

On 10 October Delamain received his instructions, plans to protect British interests at the head of the Persian Gulf, the support of Al-Mohammerah (now Khorramshahr) and operations in Ottoman Mesopotamia, the details for the operations of Indian Expeditionary Force D. Delamain was ordered to get in touch with the naval commander in chief. The brigade was to disembark at Abadan or Mohammerah but was not to become embroiled with the Ottomans or the local population. If the Ottomans joined in the war, the rest of the 6th (Poona) Division, held in readiness, swiftly would join the landing force.

== Landing ==
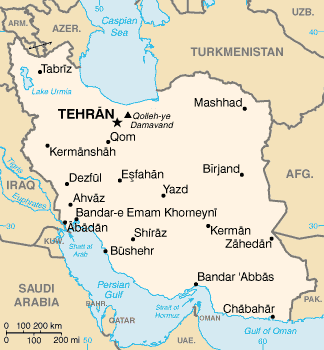
Map of Iran

The initial landing force was a contingent of Royal Marines from HMS Ocean and British Indian troops of the 16th (Poona) Brigade. The British sloop HMS Odin shelled the Turkish positions near the old fortress of Fao, silencing the enemy batteries and clearing the way for the landing force. Six-hundred men came ashore in the shallow, muddy waters with two mountain guns in tow and faced little resistance. The combined British and Indian force captured the poorly prepared Ottoman positions swiftly, seizing a large amount of largely undamaged material including several field guns, many of them still in position and loaded. Evidently, the weak Ottoman garrison was abandoned by its soldiers when the fort commander known as the "Bimbashi of Fao Fort" was killed by a shell.

== Aftermath ==
The landing and capture of Fao was a strategic blunder for the Ottomans from which they would never truly recover as evidenced by the subsequent string of defeats suffered by the Empire at the hands of the British in the following year. The Ottomans also no longer controlled a key access point to the Persian Gulf, and the British facilities were largely safe. However, the British felt that their facilities would not be truly safe until they managed to capture Baghdad. This led to several campaigns against Baghdad that would result in the fall of Baghdad by the British in 1917.
