= Lanham-Seabrook, Maryland =

- Former census-designated place
- Location of Lanham-Seabrook, Maryland
- Coordinates: 38°58′4″N 76°50′55″W
- Country: United States
- State: Maryland
- County: Prince George's

Area
  - Total: 5.3 sq mi (13.6 km^{2})
  - Land: 5.3 sq mi (13.6 km^{2})
  - Water: 0 sq mi (0.0 km^{2})

Population (2000)
  - Total: 18,190
  - Density: 3,460/sq mi (1,335/km^{2})
- Time zone: UTC−5 (Eastern (EST))
  - Summer (DST): UTC−4 (EDT)
- ZIP codes: 20703, 20706
- Area code: 301
- FIPS code: 24-45612

Lanham-Seabrook was a census-designated place (CDP) in Prince George's County, Maryland, in the United States, for the 2000 census. For the 2010 census, the area was delineated as two separate CDPs, Lanham and Seabrook.

== Geography ==
Lanham-Seabrook was located at 38°58′4″N 76°50′55″W (38.967810, −76.848692).

According to the United States Census Bureau, the place had a total area of 5.3 square miles (14 km^{2}), all of it land.

== Demographics ==
Lanham-Seabrook CDP, Maryland – Racial and ethnic composition Note: the US Census treats Hispanic/Latino as an ethnic category. This table excludes Latinos from the racial categories and assigns them to a separate category. Hispanics/Latinos may be of any race.
Race / Ethnicity (NH = Non-Hispanic)	Pop 2000	% 2000
White alone (NH)	4,478	24.62%
Black or African American alone (NH)	11,491	63.17%
Native American or Alaska Native alone (NH)	47	0.26%
Asian alone (NH)	890	4.89%
Native Hawaiian or Pacific Islander alone (NH)	0	0.00%
Other race alone (NH)	28	0.15%
Mixed race or Multiracial (NH)	415	2.28%
Hispanic or Latino (any race)	841	4.62%
Total	18,190	100.00%

As of the census of 2000, there were 18,190 people, 6,219 households, and 4,701 families residing in the area. The population density was 3,457.7 inhabitants per square mile (1,335.0/km^{2}). There were 6,468 housing units at an average density of 1,229.5 per square mile (474.7/km^{2}). The racial makeup of the area was 26.64% White, 63.55% African American, 0.30% Native American, 4.91% Asian, 0.03% Pacific Islander, 1.88% from other races, and 2.69% from two or more races. Hispanic or Latino of any race were 4.62% of the population.

There were 6,219 households, out of which 36.4% had children under the age of 18 living with them, 52.7% were married couples living together, 17.8% had a female householder with no husband present, and 24.4% were non-families. 19.2% of all households were made up of individuals, and 4.3% had someone living alone who was 65 years of age or older. The average household size was 2.90 and the average family size was 3.32.

In the area the population was spread out, with 26.9% under the age of 18, 8.2% from 18 to 24, 32.1% from 25 to 44, 24.5% from 45 to 64, and 8.4% who were 65 years of age or older. The median age was 36 years. For every 100 females, there were 92.6 males. For every 100 females age 18 and over, there were 87.9 males.

The median income for a household in the area was $63,450, and the median income for a family was $70,094 (these figures had risen to $79,087 and $92,648 respectively as of a 2007 estimate). Males had a median income of $41,345 versus $37,571 for females. The per capita income for the area was $25,066. About 3.6% of families and 4.8% of the population were below the poverty line, including 4.7% of those under age 18 and 6.3% of those age 65 or over.

== See also ==
- Lanham, Maryland
- Seabrook, Maryland
