= Lanham (surname) =

Lanham is a surname. Notable people with the surname include:

- Andrew Lanham, American film screenwriter
- Charles C. Lanham (1928-2015), American politician
- Charles T. Lanham (1902-1978), United States Army general
- Edwin Lanham (1904-1979), American writer
- Fritz G. Lanham (1880-1965), American politician
- Henderson Lovelace Lanham (1888-1957), American politician
- Leigh Lanham (born 1977), English speedway rider
- John Lanham (1924-2007), American judge
- Richard A. Lanham (born 1936), American rhetoric theorist
- Robert Lanham (born 1971), American satirist
- S. W. T. Lanham (1846-1908), American politician
