= 1st Expeditionary Force (Ottoman Empire) =

1st Expeditionary Force Birinci Kuvve-i Seferiye
- Active: November 1914 – 20 September 1915
- Country: Ottoman Empire
- Branch: Ottoman Army
- Type: Expeditionary Force
- Patron: Sultan of the Ottoman Empire
- Engagements: Caucasus Campaign (World War I); Battle of Dilman; Second Battle of Tortum

Commanders
- Notable commanders: Kaymakam Kâzım Karabekir Bey; Kaymakam Ali İhsân Bey

The 1st Expeditionary Force (Turkish: Birinci Kuvve-i Seferiye) of the Ottoman Empire was one of the expeditionary forces of the Ottoman Army.

== Order of battle ==
In December 1914, the 1st Expeditionary Force was structured as follows:

- 1st Expeditionary Force HQ (commander: Kaymakam Kâzım Karabekir Bey)
  - 7th Infantry Regiment (3rd Division, İzmit)
  - 9th Infantry Regiment (3rd Division, Adapazarı)
  - 44th Infantry Regiment (15th Division, Kayseri)
  - 3rd Battalion (Mountain Howitzer) (4th Artillery Regiment, Edirne)
  - 4th Artillery Regiment
