= Ali İhsan Sâbis =

Turkish politician

Ali İhsan Pasha 1317-Top. 1
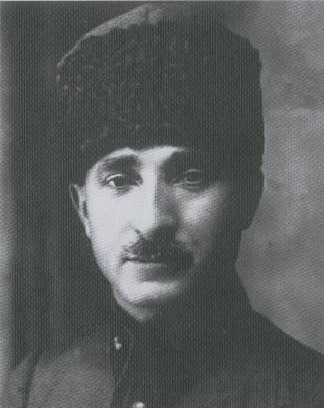
- Ali İhsan Pasha
- Born: 1882; Constantinople, Ottoman Empire
- Died: December 9, 1957 (aged 74–75); Istanbul, Turkey
- Burial place: Zincirlikuyu Mezarlığı
- Military career
- Allegiance: Ottoman Empire; Turkey
- Service years: Ottoman: 1902–1919; Turkey: September 25, 1921 – June 22, 1922
- Rank: Orgeneral
- Commands: 1st division of the General headquarters, Chief of Staff of the Second Army, XIII Corps (deputy), General Reserve of the Third Army, XI Corps (deputy), 1st Expeditionary Force, IX Corps, XIII Corps, IV Corps, Sixth Army; First Army
- Conflicts: Balkan Wars; First World War; Battle of Dujaila; Battle of Sauj Bulak; Turkish War of Independence
- Other work: Member of the GNAT (Afyonkarahisar)

Ali İhsan Pasha (1882 – 9 December 1957) was the commander for the Sixth Army of the Ottoman Empire during World War I. After the war he was exiled to Malta by the British occupation forces. After returning to Turkey, he was appointed to the commandship of the First Army of Turkey. But shortly before the battle of Dumlupınar, he retired. During World War II, Pasha, director for the pro-Nazi Türkische Post, was court-martialed and imprisoned for 15 months for sending threatening letters against President İsmet İnönü for taking an increasingly anti-German stance. In 1941, Hitler personally invited him and Hüseyin Hüsnü Emir Erkilet to the Eastern Front, albeit Ali Ilhsan was replaced by General Ali Fuad Erden.

== World War I ==
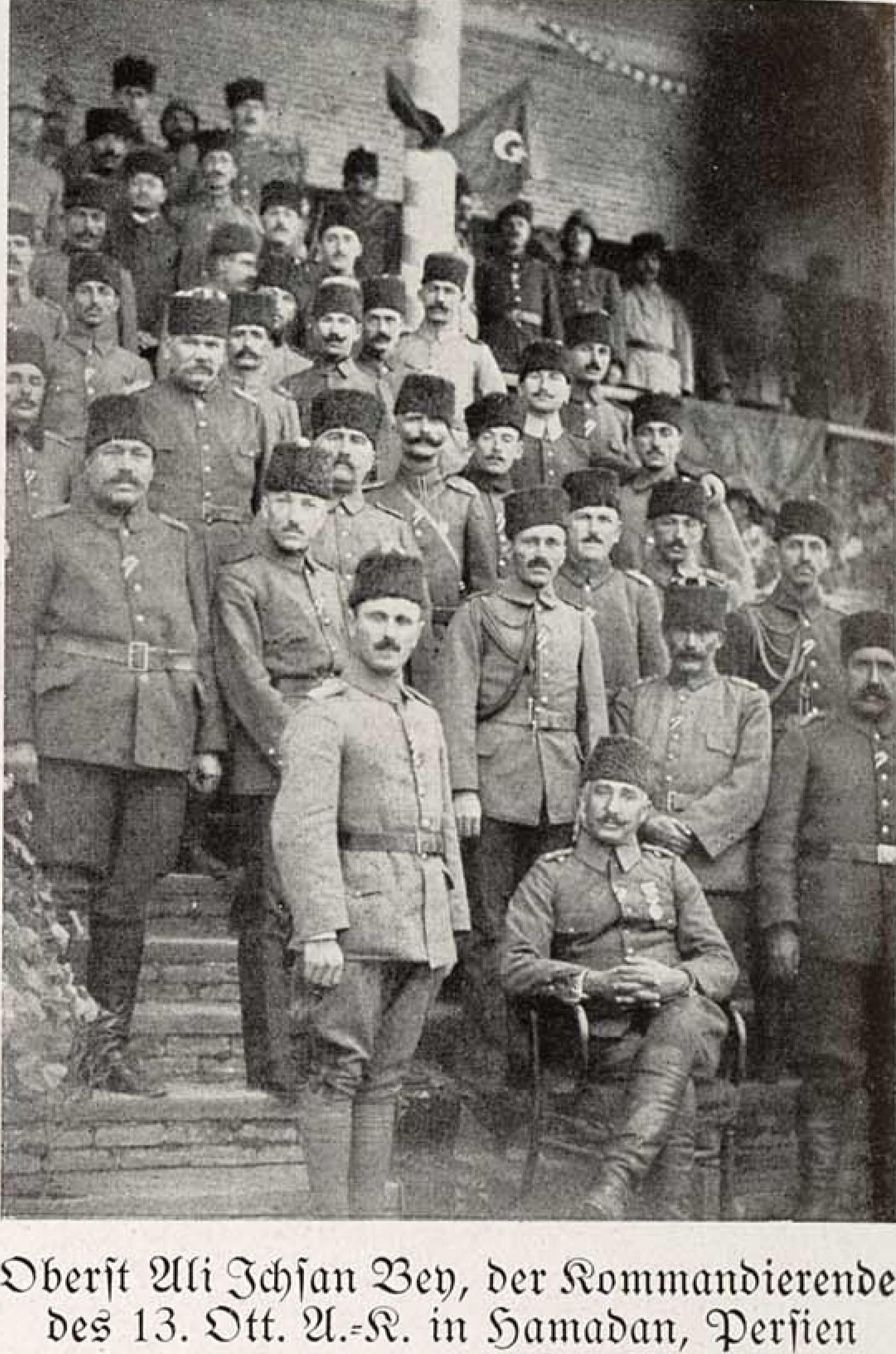
The commander of the XIII Corps Ali İhsan Sâbis and his men (Hamedan)

In February 1916, he was assigned as the commander of the Ottoman XIII Corps, which had a considerable role in the successful Siege of Kut. In 1918, his army was defeated by the British forces and he surrendered the remains of the 6th Army in October 1918 at the Battle of Sharqat, allowing the British to occupy Mosul in early November.

== Armenian genocide ==
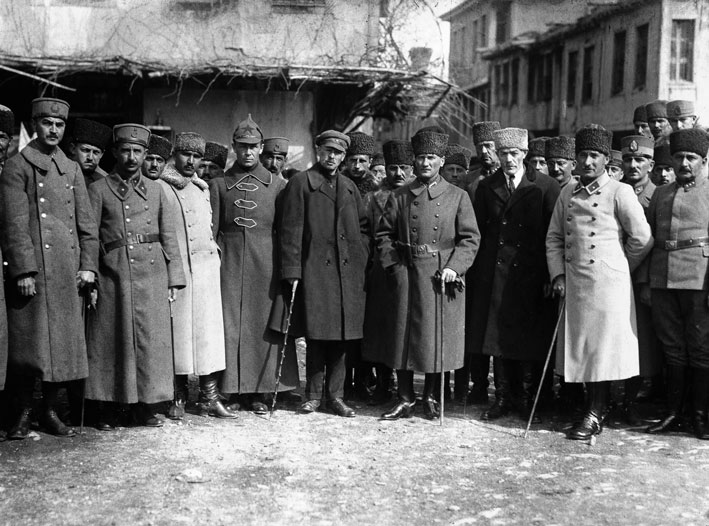
Mustafa Kemal's visit to Çay in the morning of 31 March 1922 during the Turkish War of Independence. Ali İhsan Pasha can be seen on the far right.

Ali İhsan is also known for his role in the Armenian genocide. While carrying his duties as commander of the 51st division, the Armenians that belonged to those units were murdered outright. When he took command of the 4th army, Ali Ihsan played a crucial role in the forceful exhaustion and starvation of Armenians, which accounted for the lives of tens and thousands. According to the German foreign ministry:

General A. Ihsan countless times and purposefully let the Germans know that he would not allow a single Armenian stay alive in his command zone. He bragged to German officers that "he had killed Armenians with his own hands" (rühmte sich mit eigener Hand Armenier getötet zu haben).

Ali Ihsan Sabis was appointed the head of the 6th army and was tasked to enter Iran where he besieged the Armenian contingents in the area who were led by General Andranik Ozanian. He had also warned the local chieftains that they would be killed if Armenian refugees were hiding under their protection. Proceeding with massacring the local Armenian population, Ihsan confessed in front of a delegation of Armenians in Tabriz on 11 August:

I thank you for having come out to greet me, but listen to what I am going to tell you: above all, prove the truth of your words by your deeds. You are not unaware of all the afflictions that the Armenians of Urmia, Salmast, and Khoy have brought down upon the Muslim population. In retaliation, we killed the Armenians of Khoy and I gave the order to massacre the Armenians of Maku. If you with to be well treated, honor the promises that you have just made. If you do not, I cannot offer you any guarantees.

This speech was affirmed by the archives of the French foreign ministry which states:

Ali Ihsan Paşa, formerly the Commander of the Army Corps stationed at Van, entered Tabriz at the end of June 1918 in the capacity of Commander-in-Chief of the Ottoman Forces in Azerbaijan...In an address to an Armenian delegation he said approximately the following: "Let it be known that during my entry into Khoy I had the Armenians of the area massacred, without distinction of age and sex ..."

During a reception of the Armenian Prelate Mgr. Nerses, Ali Ihsan told him: "I had a half a million of your coreligionists massacred. I can offer you a cup of tea."

== See also ==
- List of high-ranking commanders of the Turkish War of Independence
- List of commanders of the First Army of Turkey
