= XIII Corps (Ottoman Empire) =

XIII Corps On Üçüncü Kolordu
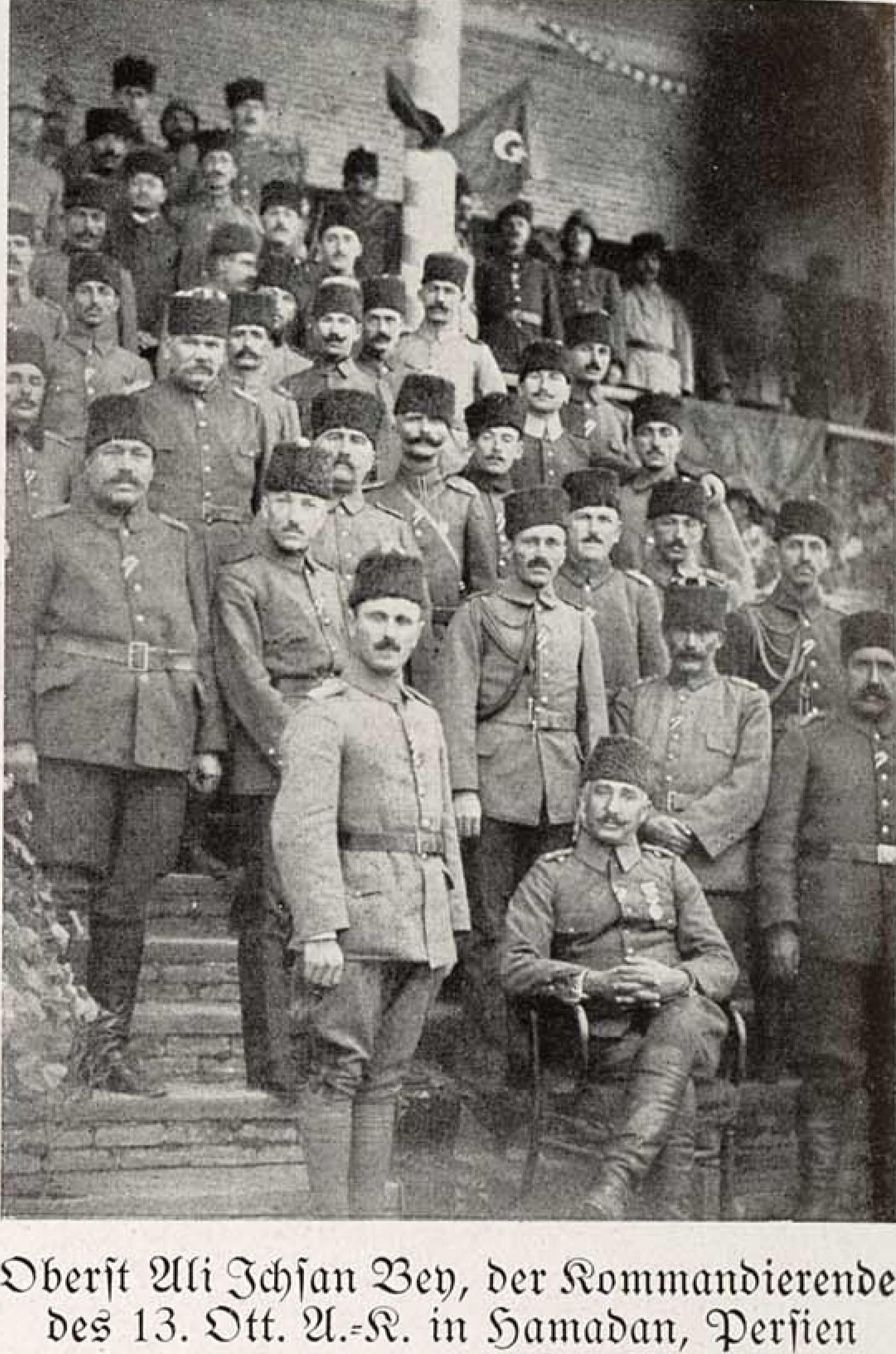
- Ali İhsan Bey and his men (Hamadan)
- Active: 1911–
- Country: Ottoman Empire
- Type: Corps
- Garrison/HQ: Baghdad
- Patron: Sultans of the Ottoman Empire
- Engagements: Mesopotamian campaign Persian Campaign

Commanders
- Notable commanders: Mirliva Hüsamettin Pasha; Mirliva Ali İhsan Pasha (February 1916-October 1917); Miralay Selâhattin Bey

The XIII Corps of the Ottoman Empire (Turkish: 13 ncü Kolordu or On Üçüncü Kolordu) was one of the corps of the Ottoman Army. It was formed in the early 20th century during Ottoman military reforms.

== Formation ==
=== Order of battle, 1911 ===
With further reorganizations of the Ottoman Army, to include the creation of corps level headquarters, by 1911 the XIII Corps was headquartered in Baghdad. The Corps before the First Balkan War in 1911 was structured as such:

- XIII Corps, Baghdad
  - 37th Infantry Division, Baghdad
    - 109th Infantry Regiment,
    - 110th Infantry Regiment, vicinity of Baghdad
    - 111th Infantry Regiment, Baghdad
    - 37th Rifle Battalion, Najaf
    - 37th Field Artillery Regiment, Baghdad
    - 37th Division Band, Baghdad
  - 38th Infantry Division, Basra
    - 112th Infantry Regiment, Basra
    - 113th Infantry Regiment, Amara, Baghdad
    - 114th Infantry Regiment, Müntafik
    - 38th Rifle Battalion, vicinity of Baghdad
    - Field Artillery Battalion, Baghdad
- Units of XIII Corps
- 14th Cavalry Brigade, Baghdad
  - 33rd Cavalry Regiment, Baghdad
  - 34th Cavalry Regiment, Baghdad
  - 35th Cavalry Regiment, Baghdad
- 25th Mountain Artillery Battalion, Baghdad
- 13th Engineer Company, Baghdad
- 13th telegraph Company, Baghdad
- 13th Transport Battalion, Baghdad
- Border companies x 6

== World War I ==
=== Order of battle, August 1914 ===
In August 1914, the corps was structured as follows:

- XIII Corps (Mesopotamia)
  - 37th Division

=== Order of battle, November 1914 ===
In November 1914, the corps was structured as follows:

- XIII Corps (Moving to Third Army)
  - 37th Division

=== Order of battle, late summer 1915 ===
In the late summer of 1915, the corps was structured as follows:

- XIII Corps (Mesopotamia)
  - 35th Division, 38th Division

=== Order of battle, January 1916 ===
In January 1916, the corps was structured as follows:

- XIII Corps (Mesopotamia)
  - 35th Division, 52nd Division

=== Order of battle, August 1916, December 1916 ===
In August 1916, December 1916, the corps was structured as follows:

- XIII Corps (Mesopotamia)
  - 2nd Division, 4th Division, 6th Division

=== Order of battle, August 1917, January 1918, June 1918, September 1918 ===
In August 1917, January 1918, June 1918, September 1918, the corps was structured as follows:

- XIII Corps (Mesopotamia)
  - 2nd Division, 6th Division

== After Mudros ==
=== Order of battle, November 1918 ===
In November 1918, the corps was structured as follows:

- XIII Corps (Mesopotamia)
  - 2nd Division, 6th Division

=== Order of battle, January 1919 ===
In January 1919, the corps was structured as follows:

- XIII Corps (Mesopotamia, Diyâr-ı Bekir)
  - 2nd Division (Salur)
    - 14th Infantry Regiment, 15th Infantry Regiment, 24th Infantry Regiment
  - 5th Division (Mardin)
    - 1st Infantry Regiment, 6th Infantry Regiment, 18th Infantry Regiment
  - 12th Cavalry Regiment
