= Bekir Sami Günsav =

Turkish military officer

Bekir Sami Günsav 1315-P. 16
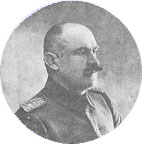
- Miralay Bekir Sami Bey
- Born: 1879; Bandırma, Hüdavendigâr Vilayet, Ottoman Empire
- Died: 9 September 1934 (aged 54–55); Istanbul, Turkey
- Burial place: Karacaahmet Cemetery
- Military career
- Allegiance: Ottoman Empire; Turkey
- Service years: Ottoman Empire: 1900–1920; Turkey: 1920–1924
- Rank: Colonel
- Commands: 43rd Regiment, 5th Expeditionary Force, 52nd Division, Chataldja Defense Line, Department of Export and Order; 56th Division, XVII Corps (deputy), XX Corps, Muğla and Antalya Area Command, Military Representative to Northern Caucasus
- Conflicts: Balkan Wars; First World War; Turkish War of Independence

Bekir Sami Günsav (1879 in Bandırma – 1934 in Istanbul) was a Turkish career officer, who served in the Ottoman Army and the Turkish Army.

He was born in the village of Haydar in the district of Bandırma to father Hasan Bey and mother Ayşe Hanım. Hasan Bey was a member of a Circassian family which moved from Circassia in the North Caucasus to northwestern Anatolia. Their family name was Zarukhue.

He fought the first stage of the Turkish War of Independence as the commander of 56th Division.

== Works ==
(Ed. Muhittin Ünal), Miralay Bekir Sami Günsav'ın Kurtuluş Savaşı Anıları, Cem Yayınevi, 2002, ISBN 975-406-510-1.

== See also ==
- List of high-ranking commanders of the Turkish War of Independence
