= Battle of Amara =

- Part of the Mesopotamian campaign of World War I
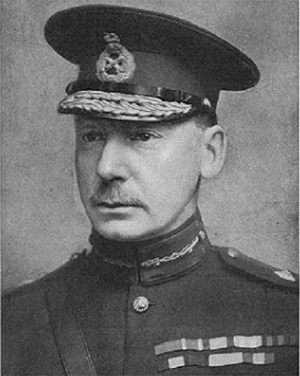
- General Charles Townshend, who commanded the British forces during the battle.
Date	May 31 – June 3, 1915
Location	Amara, Ottoman Iraq
Result	British victory

Belligerents
British Empire: British Raj; United Kingdom	Ottoman Empire

Commanders and leaders
(United Kingdom) Charles Townshend	(Ottoman Empire) Unknown

Units involved
6th (Poona) Division: 16th Brigade; 17th Brigade	

Casualties and losses
4 killed 21 wounded	120 killed or wounded 1,773 captured

The Battle of Amara, also known as the Second Battle of Qurna (May 31 – June 3, 1915), was a military engagement between the forces of the British and Ottoman Empires during the Mesopotamian Campaign of World War I. The battle took place in the flooded marshes and islands along the Tigris river between the towns of Qurna and Amara and resulted in the British capture of Amara and rout of Ottoman forces in the area.

== Background ==
Following the Ottoman defeat at Shaiba, General John Nixon ordered the 6th Division under General Charles Townshend to advance north from its position at Qurna and capture the city of Amara. Nixon hoped that by doing so, he would force the Ottomans to withdraw their forces from the Karun river to the east and pave the way for an advance on Baghdad.

The land between Qurna and Amara was largely composed of flooded marshes with several hills protruding from both the eastern and western banks of the river. The Ottoman army had taken up defensive positions on these islands, with gun emplacements on the western side of the river supporting several entrenched infantry positions. Further to the north were also the villages of Abu Aran, Muzaibila, and Ruta, which were garrisoned by Ottoman and Arab troops. To counter this defense, Townshend equipped his troops with bellums (a type of small canoe used by Tigris natives, seating 5-10 men) and divided them into four groups distinguished by colored flags, with the intention of assaulting Ottoman positions on both the west and east sides of the river simultaneously. The amphibious attack would be supported by fire from a small flotilla of sloops, armed launches, and various other light vessels, as well as from 4-inch guns and machine guns mounted on barges and rafts.

== The battle ==
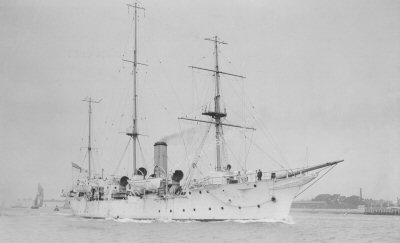
HMS Espiegle, which served as Townshend's headquarters during the first half of the battle.

At 1:00 AM on May 31, the 22nd Punjabis began their advance through the marshes on the eastern side of the river, arriving at a position 1500 meters south of the Ottoman emplacements at 4:30. At 5:30 the British gunboats and artillery began a bombardment of the front line, which the Ottomans responded to 20 minutes later with inaccurate fire against Townshend's headquarters aboard the sloop HMS Espiegle. The 17th Brigade group, composed of the Oxford and Buckinghamshire Light Infantry, the 103rd Mahratta Light Infantry, and the 119th Infantry regiments, began to advance along the western side of the river at around 6:00. At the same time, the 22nd Punjabis on the east bank assaulted the Ottoman line, capturing the fortified positions there and using them to support the western advance with machine gun and rifle fire. All of the fortified islands along the Ottoman front had been captured with minimal resistance by 11:30 AM, prompting Townshend to call a halt to the first phase of the attack.

The British ships began a bombardment of Abu Aran at 5:30 AM the next day, which was met with no response from the Ottoman artillery. Aerial reconnaissance soon reported that the Ottoman troops stationed in all three of the villages were retreating en masse and Townshend's gunboats quickly advanced in pursuit, reaching the villages by around 3:00 PM. Led by the armed launch Shaitan, the British flotilla caught up with the fleeing Ottoman ships at 6:00 PM and opened fire, stranding the gunboat Marmaris and several small boats and barges loaded with troops and supplies near Ezra's Tomb. The river was too shallow at this point for large vessels to continue any further without difficulty, so Townshend transferred command to the armed tug Comet and continued upriver with three armed launches. The sloop HMS Odin remained behind to take possession of the Marmaris.

After a day's travel the British launches, with Shaitan now leading by a significant margin, were within sight of Amara. Shaitan entered Amara on the morning of June 3, sinking a steamer carrying Ottoman troops and passing through the town without drawing any fire. Half a mile north of the town around 300 Ottoman troops emerged from the forested banks of the river and surrendered to Shaitan's nine-man crew, who collected their arms and escorted them back to Amara. The crew held the town until the rest of the launches arrived and Townshend's 41-man force accepted the surrender of Amara's civil governor and military commandant. Around 800 more Ottoman troops were taken prisoner and Townshend remained in Amara until the next day, when a steamer carrying the 2nd Brigade of the Royal Norfolk Regiment arrived to secure his position.

== Aftermath ==
After the capture of Amara, Townshend's flotilla returned to the British headquarters at Basra, with only the Comet and Shaitan remaining behind. General Nixon praised Townshend's efficiency and speed in his report and commended the level of cooperation achieved between the Army and Navy forces during the battle. The crew of the Shaitan were also awarded the Distinguished Service Medal for their role in the town's capture.

The success of the British at Amara convinced Nixon to continue the advance up the Tigris, leading to the battle of Ctesiphon and siege of Kut.
