= 38th Infantry Division (Ottoman Empire) =

- Active: 1914-1918
- Country: Ottoman Empire
- Allegiance: (Ottoman Empire) Ottoman Army
- Branch: Ottoman Army
- Type: Infantry
- Part of: 3rd Army (initially); 9th Army
- Garrison/HQ: Tercan, Erzurum, Refahiye, Erzincan
- Engagements: World War I; Caucasus Campaign; Battle of Sarikamish; Erzurum Offensive (1916)

Commanders
- Notable commanders: Kaymakam (Lieutenant Colonel) Ahmet Fikri Bey (1915–1916); Miralay (Colonel) Mustafa Ragıp Bey (1917)

The 38th Infantry Division was an infantry division of the Ottoman Empire. It served primarily on the Caucasus Campaign against the Russian Empire during World War I.

== Formation and Organization ==
The division was established in late 1914 as part of the reorganization of the Ottoman land forces. It was initially assigned to the 3rd Army and later transferred to the 9th Army.

=== Division Structure (1916) ===
- 112th Infantry Regiment
- 113th Infantry Regiment
- 114th Infantry Regiment
- 38th Division Artillery Battalion
- Ammunition and supply units

== Caucasus Campaign and Engagements ==
Between 1915 and 1917, the 38th Infantry Division participated in several key battles on the Caucasus front. It was among the units that suffered heavy losses following the Battle of Sarikamish. In 1916, the division was tasked with defending the Erzurum line during the Erzurum Offensive (1916) and was deployed to delay the Russian advance around Tercan, Erzincan, and Refahiye.

During the harsh winter of 1916–1917, the division faced severe hardships due to both weather conditions and logistical deficiencies. It entrenched along the Bayburt–Erzincan line and attempted to maintain order during the retreat. Following the October Revolution in Russia in 1917, fighting on the front diminished and the division was reorganized.

According to the Archives of the Turkish General Staff (ATASE), the 38th Infantry Division withdrew to the Erzincan line following the fall of Erzurum in 1916, and its manpower decreased significantly. Reports indicate that some companies of the 112th Regiment had fewer than 100 men. The artillery battalion was limited by a lack of ammunition.

Historian Edward J. Erickson described the division as “a determined yet worn-out Ottoman infantry division fighting in the mountainous east under harsh climatic and logistical conditions.”

== Commanders ==
- Kaymakam (Lieutenant Colonel) Ahmet Fikri Bey – 1915–1916
- Miralay (Colonel) Mustafa Ragıp Bey – 1917

== Post-war ==
After the signing of the Armistice of Mudros in 1918, the division was officially disbanded. Its personnel were demobilized and its equipment handed over. Some officers and soldiers joined local militia forces and continued their activities.
