= Halil Kut =

Turkish general

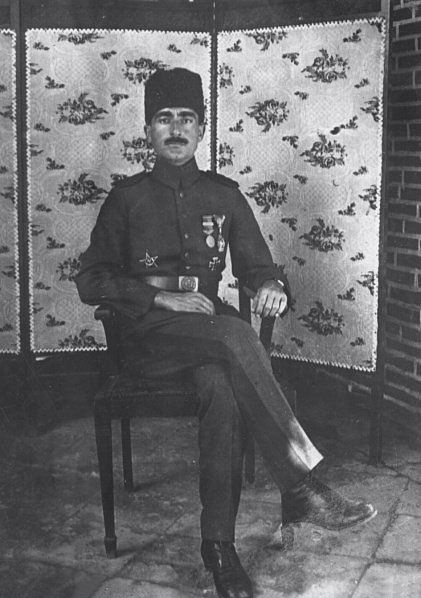
- Kut before the end of WWI
- Born: 1881; Beşiktaş, Istanbul, Ottoman Empire
- Died: 20 August 1957 (aged 75–76); Istanbul, Turkey
- Military career
- Allegiance: Ottoman Empire; Turkey
- Rank: Major general
- Unit: Sixth Army
- Conflicts: Balkan Wars; Italo-Turkish War; World War I: Persian campaign (World War I); Battle of Dilman; Battle of Seray Mountain; Mesopotamian Campaign; Battle of Sheikh Sa'ad; Battle of Hanna; Battle of Wadi; Siege of Kut; Battle of Bughaila; Capture of Fallujah (1917)

Halil Kut (1881 – 20 August 1957), also known as Halil Pasha, (Note: In this Ottoman Turkish style name, the given name is Halil, the title is Pasha, and there is no family name.) was an Ottoman Turkish military commander and politician. He served in the Ottoman Army during World War I, notably taking part in the military campaigns against Russia in the Caucasus and the British in Mesopotamia.

Halil was responsible for numerous atrocities committed against Armenian and Assyrian civilians during the Armenian genocide, overseeing the massacres of Armenian men, women and children in Bitlis, Mush, and Beyazit. Many of the victims were buried alive in specially prepared ditches. He also crossed into neighboring Persia and massacred Armenians, Assyrians and Persians.

== Biography ==
Halil Pasha graduated from the War Academy (Staff College) in Constantinople in 1905 and received a commission with the rank of Distinguished Captain (Mümtaz Yüzbaşı). His paternal lineage was based on the Gagauz people.

When the Ottoman empire entered World War I, Kut was serving in the Ottoman High Command in Constantinople. He was the military commander of the Istanbul Vilayat between January and December 1914.

In January 1916, he was given command of the Ottoman forces besieging the British garrison held up in Kut in southern Iraq.

=== Role in Armenian genocide ===
Halil Pasha was responsible for massacring Armenians during the course of the Armenian genocide. He took part in the killings of civilians during the Siege of Van in 1915. He ordered Armenian men in the units under his command be put to death. A Turkish officer in Halil's force testified that "Halil had the entire Armenian population (men, women and children) in the areas of Bitlis, Muş, and Beyazit also massacred without pity. My company received a similar order. Many of the victims were buried alive in especially prepared ditches."

The German vice-consul of Erzurum Max Erwin von Scheubner-Richter reported that "Halil Bey's campaign in northern Persia included the massacre of his Armenian and Syrian battalions and the expulsion of the Armenian, Syrian, and Persian population out of Persia ..." After the defeat of the Ottoman Empire in World War I he was charged for his role in the Armenian genocide before the Turkish Courts-Martial. Kut was arrested in January 1919 and later sent to detention in Malta. He managed to evade prosecution and fled from detention to Anatolia in August 1920.

Kut went on to claim in his memoirs that he had "more or less" killed 300,000 Armenians. During a meeting with a group of Armenians in Yerevan in the summer of 1918, he declared to that he had "endeavored to wipe out the Armenian nation to the last individual." Halil justified his actions by accusing the Armenians of being a threat to the Ottoman Empire. He wrote:

The Armenian nation, because it tried to erase my country from history as prisoners of the enemy in the most horrible and painful days of my homeland, which I had tried to annihilate to the last member of, the Armenian nation, which I want to restore its peace and luxury, because today it takes shelter under the virtue of the Turkish nation. If you remain loyal to the Turkish homeland, I'll do every good thing that I can. If you hook on several senseless Komitadjis again, and try to betray Turks and the Turkish homeland, I will order my forces which surround all your country and I won't leave even a single breathing Armenian all over the earth. Come to your senses.

Kut was permitted to return to Turkey after the declaration of the Republic of Turkey in 1923. He died in 1957 in Istanbul. His last wish was to have rakı (an alcoholic drink) poured on his grave, which became a source of controversy among conservatives in Turkey.

== See also ==
- Witnesses and testimonies of the Armenian genocide

== Sources ==
- Biographical note - Khalil Pasha - downloaded from FirstWorldWar.com, January 13, 2006.
- Gaunt, David (2006). Massacres, resistance, protectors: muslim-christian relations in Eastern Anatolia during world war I (1st Gorgias Press ed.). Piscataway, NJ: Gorgias. ISBN 1-59333-301-3.
- Kiernan, Ben (2008). Blood and Soil: Modern Genocide 1500–2000. Melbourne University Publishing. ISBN 978-0-522-85477-0.
- Winter, J. M. (2003). America and the Armenian genocide of 1915. Cambridge University Press. ISBN 978-0-511-16382-1.
