= Affair of Duqma =

Military battle during the Mesopotamian campaign of World War I

Affair of Duqma Battle of the Marl Plain
- Part of the Samarra offensive during the Mesopotamian campaign of World War I
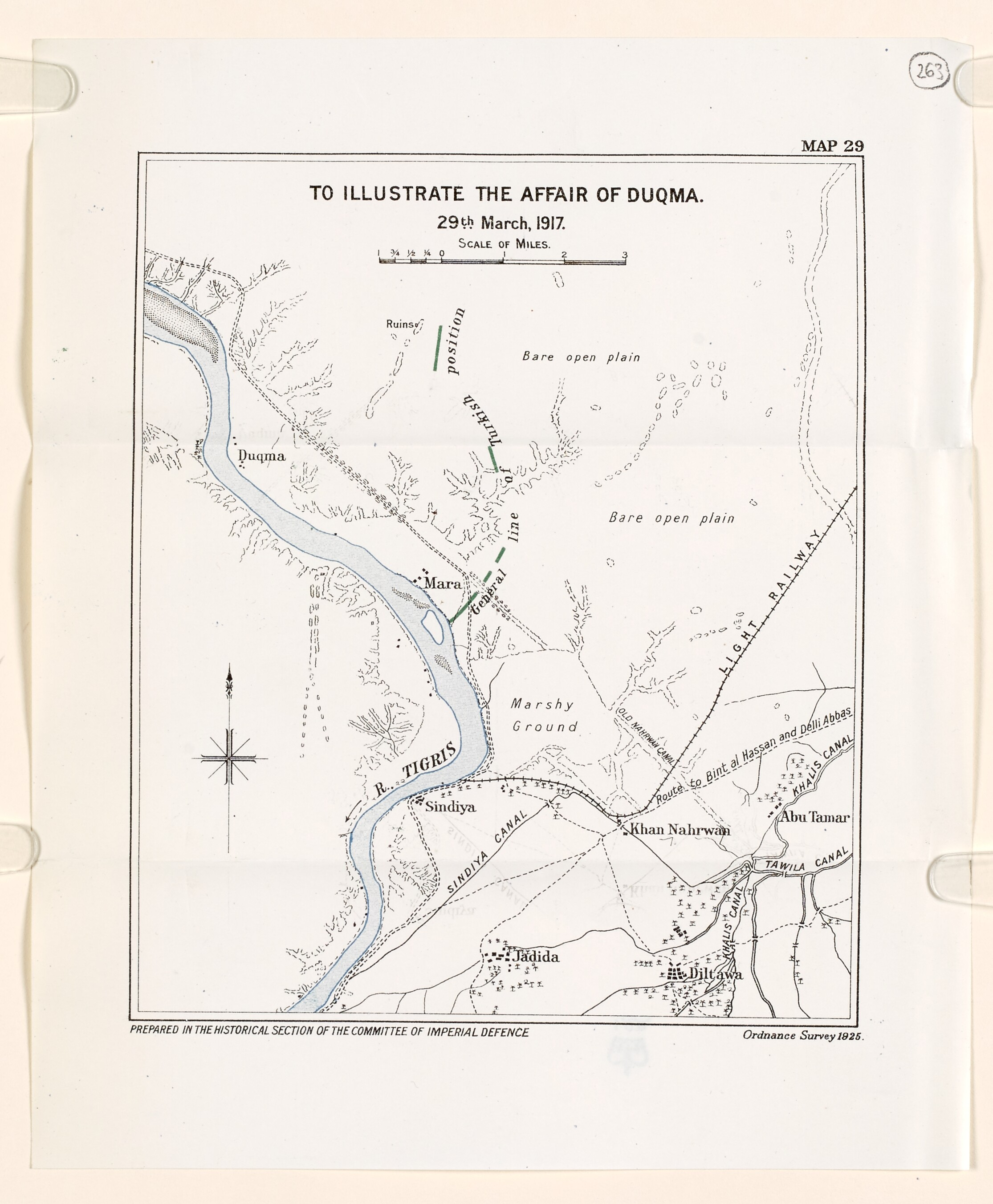
- Map illustrating the Affair of Duqma
Date	29 March 1917
Location	Mara, 4 miles south-east of Duqma (Note: Although it is referred to as the "Affair of Duqma" after a nearby village about four miles north-west of Mara, the British nevertheless attacked Ottoman forces in the village of Mara during the engagement.)
Result	British victory

Belligerents
(United Kingdom) British Empire	Ottoman Empire

Commanders and leaders
(United Kingdom) Walter de Sausmarez Cayley	(Ottoman Empire) Şevket Galatalı

Units involved
13th Division; 40th Brigade; 5th Wiltshires; 4th South Wales Borderers; 39th Brigade; 9th Royal Warwicks; 7th Glosters; 7th North Staffords	Sixth Army; XVIII Corps; 52nd Division

Strength
Unknown	5,500; 5,000 infantry; 500 cavalry

Casualties and losses
514	200 dead 180 prisoners

The Affair of Duqma, (Note: Turkish: Deame Muharebesi; Arabic: معركة الدوجمة) also known as the Battle of the Marl Plain, was a military engagement fought on 29 March 1917 during the Mesopotamian campaign of World War I between British and Ottoman forces.

As the 13th Corps slipped across the Diyala and Ali Ihsan made vigorous attempts to join the 18th Corps on the Tigris, the latter force entrenched a position at Duqma on a flat plain south of the Shatt el-Adhaim. On 29 March, the 39th and 40th Brigades attacked the position and threw the Turks back to the Adhaim, while cavalry and artillery held off the 13th Corps at Delli Abbas. Two days later, Duqma was occupied, and the Turks fell back to the Jebel Hamrin and withdrew from the west of the Diyala. As a result, on 2 April the 13th Lancers were able to join hands at Kizil Robat with a squadron of Cossacks.

== Background ==
On 11 March, the British army victoriously marched into Baghdad. The Turks were defeated, but not broken. Ali Ihsan's force was far from being crippled. He was now aiming for the Marl Plain, and the route he had chosen followed the Khalis Canal via Delli Abbas. To assist him, Halil transferred Shefket's Corps across the Tigris to the Shatt El Adhaim. While the Battle of Mount Hamrin was being fought, a force of about 5,000 infantry and 500 cavalry was moving toward Sindiya to secure Ali Ihsan's flank.

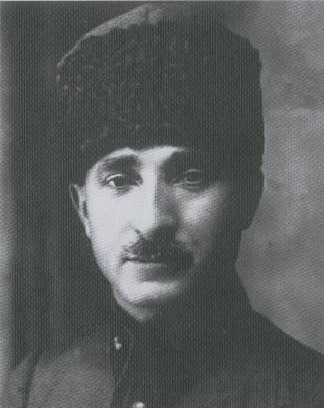
Ali İhsan

Maude realized what was taking place and, determined to prevent Shefket and Ali Ihsan from joining forces, set two simultaneous operations in motion. The 7th Cavalry Brigade, already with Keary's column at Baquba, was reinforced by the rest of the Cavalry Division, and Leslie Jones, the divisional commander, was ordered to stop Ali Ihsan from moving beyond Delli Abbas. At the same time, Caley's 13th Division was sent up the Tigris to deal with Shefket's column near Sindiya. Finding the Turks entrenched near Duqma, Caley attacked, and what became known as the "Battle of the Marl Plain" followed.

== Battle ==
=== The 40th Brigade's Assault on the Turkish Forward Rifle Pits ===
At daybreak, the 40th Brigade was about 5,000 yards from the Turkish advanced line, which consisted of rifle pits less than 1,000 yards in front of the main position. Caley's intention had been that only the 39th Brigade would make a frontal attack; this would serve to hold the Turks while the other brigade swung around and enveloped the Turks left flank. However, finding that this flank extended far beyond expectations, The 5th Wiltshires, the strongest battalion in the brigade, was selected to lead the assault. At 7 a.m., they advanced. They moved forward under artillery and rifle fire and took the forward rifle pits, driving out the defenders. Of the roughly 500 men engaged, more than 195, including seven officers, were killed before reaching the first Turkish forward line.

They were later joined by half of the South Wales Borderers advancing on their left rear. The combined force dug in while artillery moved forward to closer positions for support. As the exact location of the main Turkish line was uncertain and casualties were heavy, they were ordered to hold position until the 39th Brigade's attack developed.

=== The 39th Brigade's Advance and Assault ===
Meanwhile, the 39th Brigade was advancing, comprising the 9th Royal Warwicks, the 7th Glosters, and the 7th North Staffords. Covered by the Yeomanry and motor battery on their right, the Warwicks and the Gloucestershire advanced abreast to within about 3,000 yards of the hostile position over open ground. It was 10.30 a.m. and the heat and mirage were increasing. A halt was made for three hours to allow the heat to pass and to provide time for further reconnaissance.

The artillery came up to close range, and at about 2 p.m. the advance was resumed. All three battalions advanced in line, supported by their guns. During this advance, bands of Arabs threatened the rear of the column and on several occasions cut the cable. The situation was addressed by brigade headquarters. All available personnel, including cooks and orderlies, armed themselves and repelled the attackers, without delaying the advance or diverting troops from the main attack.

The advance was carried out despite the heat, and it was not until 2.30 p.m. that the assault on the main line was delivered. The three battalions present in the brigade, the 9th Royal Warwicks, the 7th Glosters, and the 7th North Staffords, were all committed. After hard fighting, the position was taken, and the three battalions achieved their objectives, capturing 130 prisoners. The Ottoman troops withdrew to the north, and a battery narrowly escaped capture.

=== Turkish Retreat ===
Gunfire could still be heard from the main Turkish position four miles to the south. The Turkish forces were still in position. However, they were almost surrounded. While this was happening, the 40th Brigade was preparing to launch the main attack. This attack was never launched. The mirage hindered the artillery and it could not suppress the Turkish guns; and the only action taken when the 39th Brigade advanced was to send forward strong patrols. These patrols encountered concentrated enemy fire and failed to locate the hostile position exactly. All plans for an attack, even under cover of darkness, were eventually abandoned.

At 4.30, two battalions of the 38th Brigade were ordered to join the 39th Brigade, while the reserve was reinforced by a battalion of the 14th Division. It was decided to carry out the postponed attack the following morning. The 39th Brigade chose to remain where they were and began digging in, holding a semicircular position for the night, as the column considered itself isolated. The night passed quietly, and at dawn it was found that the Turkish troops had withdrawn during the night, falling back on the Shatt-el-Adhaim. The desired result of the battle—the prevention of the junction of the 13th Army Corps with the 18th—was attained.

== Aftermath ==
=== Casualties ===
The Turks are considered to have suffered considerable casualties, as nearly 200 bodies were buried and about 180 prisoners were taken. They had fought well, but their prisoners stated that the attack from the east had taken them by surprise because of the mirage.

The British casualties totalled 514, of which 255 were in the 39th Brigade and 245 in the 40th Brigade. The units that suffered the heaviest losses were the Wiltshire, which had 197 casualties out of a strength of about 500, and the Warwickshire (strength unknown), with 147 casualties.

=== Consequences ===
Following the defeat of the Turkish Tigris force, the division at Delli Abbas withdrew to the hills and joined the remainder of the Turkish forces from Persia. British forces occupied the village at dawn on 31 March. On the same morning, the Turks evacuated Mount Hamrin on the left bank of the Diyala. The crossing of the Diyala had been completed. After running into the Cavalry's block at Deli Abbas, Ali Ihsan was assumed to be retiring along the Kifri Road toward Mosul.

Halil had failed in his attempt to unite the two Corps of the Sixth Army west of the Hamrin Mountains. He then aimed to achieve the same objective farther back. Reinforcements consisting of two divisions were on their way to him, along with some German airplanes. However, by this time, he was short of ammunition, supplies were running low, and the morale of Shefket's Corps was very weak.

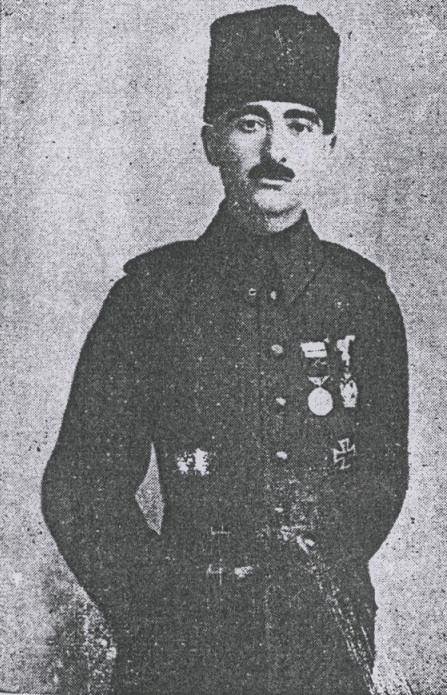
Halil Pasha

Maude understood these conditions from Intelligence reports. He wanted to take advantage of them and was also eager for the Russians to act strongly in support of his operations. In a message sent to Whitehall and passed on to Alekseyev, who had replaced the Grand Duke Michael as Commander-in-Chief of the Russian Army, Maude explained that he could not operate against both Shefket and Ali Ihsan in two different directions at the same time because he did not have enough transport. He suggested that the Russians should deal with Ali Ihsan, while he focused on Shefket's forces.

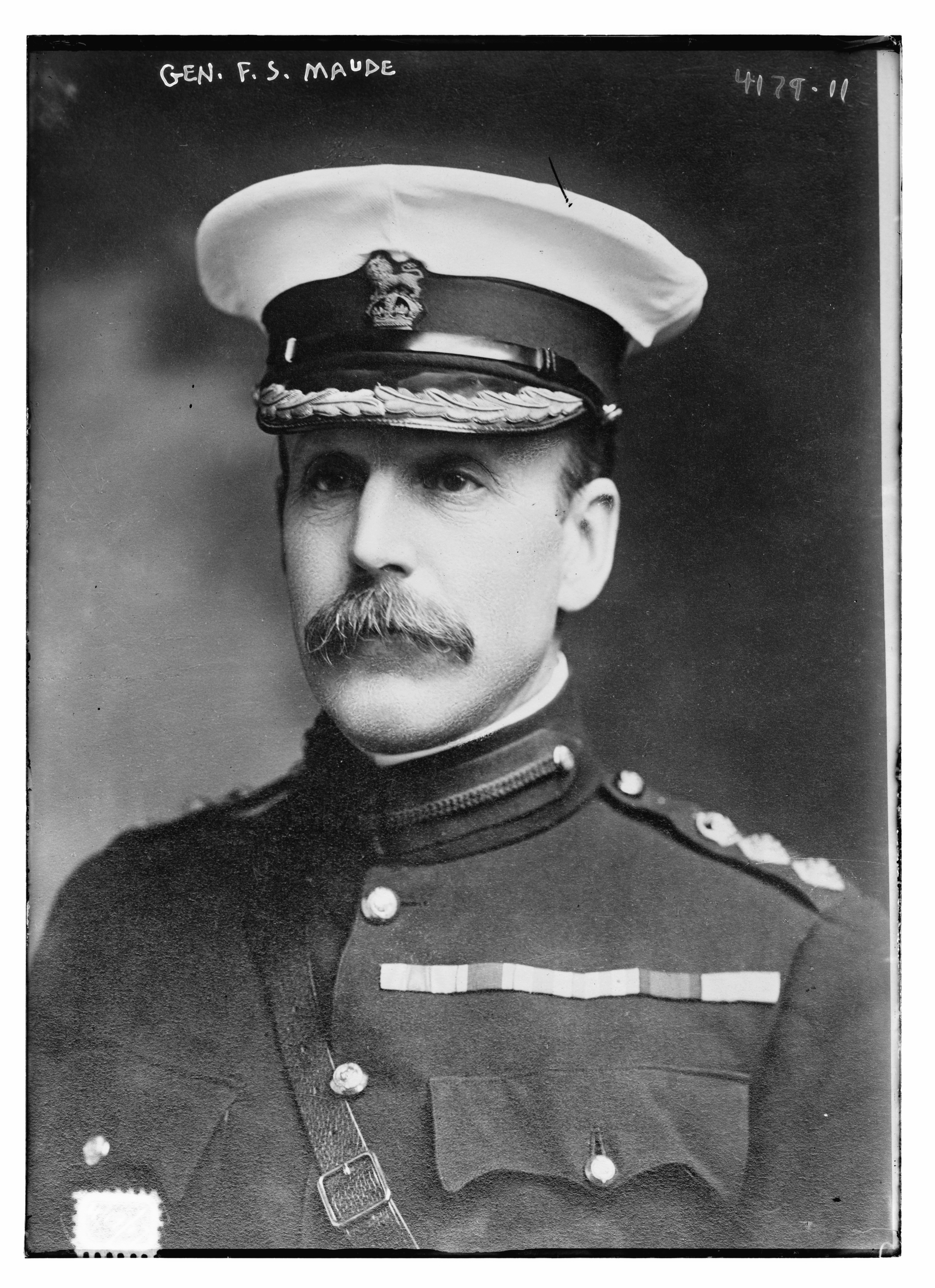
Gen. F.S. Maude

== Bibliography ==
- Burne, A. H. (1936). Mesopotamia, the Last Phase. Gale & Polden, Ltd.
- Candler, Edmund (1919). The Long Road to Baghdad. United Kingdom: Cassel.
- Barker, A. J. (1967). The Neglected War: Mesopotamia, 1914–1918. United Kingdom: Faber.
- Majd, M. G. (2006). Iraq in World War I: From Ottoman Rule to British Conquest. University Press of America.
- Moberly, F. J. (1925). The Campaign in Mesopotamia, 1914–1918. Vol. 3. London: H.M. Stationery Office.
- Rawlinson, H. G. (1929). Napier's Rifles: The History of the 5th Battalion, 6th Rajputana Rifles. United Kingdom: Oxford University Press.
