= 7th (Service) Battalion, Gloucestershire Regiment =

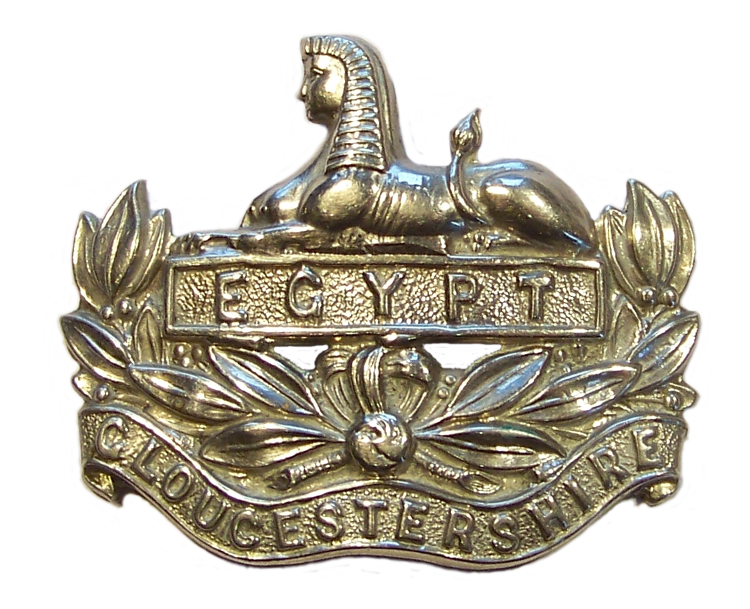
- Cap badge of the Gloucestershire Regiment
- Active: 19 August 1914–17 October 1919
- Country: United Kingdom
- Branch: New Army
- Type: Infantry
- Size: Battalion
- Part of: 13th (Western) Division; North Persia Force
- Garrison/HQ: Horfield Barracks, Bristol
- Anniversaries: Back Badge Day (21 March)
- Engagements: Battle of Chunuk Bair; Second Battle of Kut; Capture of Baghdad; Samarra offensive North Persia

Insignia
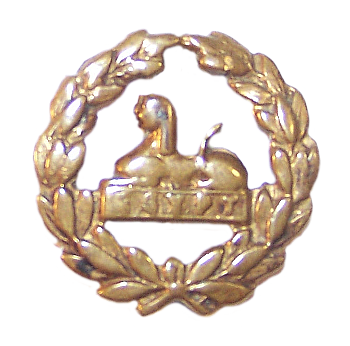
- The Glosters' 'Back Badge'

The 7th (Service) Battalion of the Gloucestershire Regiment (the 'Glosters') was a unit of 'Kitchener's Army' raised immediately after the outbreak of World War I. After a short period of training it fought in the Gallipoli Campaign, distinguishing itself at the Battle of Chunuk Bair. Afterwards it served in Mesopotamia, including the capture of Baghdad. It ended the war with the North Persia Force at Baku on the Caspian Sea.

Alfred Leete's recruitment poster for Kitchener's Army.

== Recruitment and training ==
On 6 August 1914, less than 48 hours after Britain's declaration of war, Parliament sanctioned an increase of 500,000 men for the Regular British Army, and the newly-appointed Secretary of State for War, Earl Kitchener of Khartoum issued his famous call to arms: 'Your King and Country Need You', urging the first 100,000 volunteers to come forward. This group of six divisions with supporting arms became known as Kitchener's First New Army, or 'K1'.

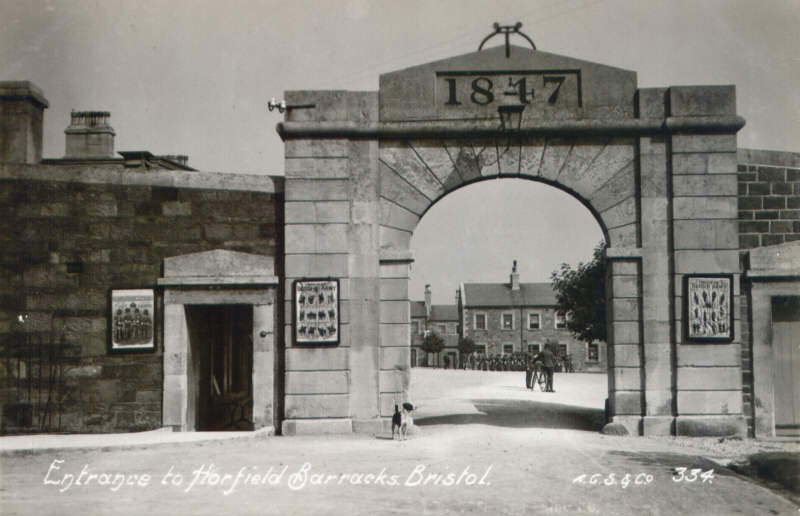
Horfield Barracks, Bristol, just before World War I: the Service battalions of the Glosters assembled here.

A flood of volunteers poured into the recruiting offices and were formed into 'Service' battalions at the regimental depots: the Gloucestershire Regiment formed its 7th Battalion on 19 August at Horfield Barracks, Bristol, enlisting men from the city and across South West England. The regimental historian described the 7th as 'a battalion of men who had joined the colours immediately war broke out, many of whom should have been officers'. The commanding officer (CO) was Lieutenant-Colonel Richard Price Jordan, who had won a Distinguished Service Order (DSO) with the Gloucesters during the Second Boer War.

The new battalion came under the command of 39th Brigade in 13th (Western) Division, forming at Tidworth Camp on Salisbury Plain. The brigade moved to billets in Basingstoke in January 1915. By the end of February the arms and equipment of 13th (Western) Division were practically complete and the division concentrated at Blackdown Camp, near Aldershot for its final intensive training.

== Service ==
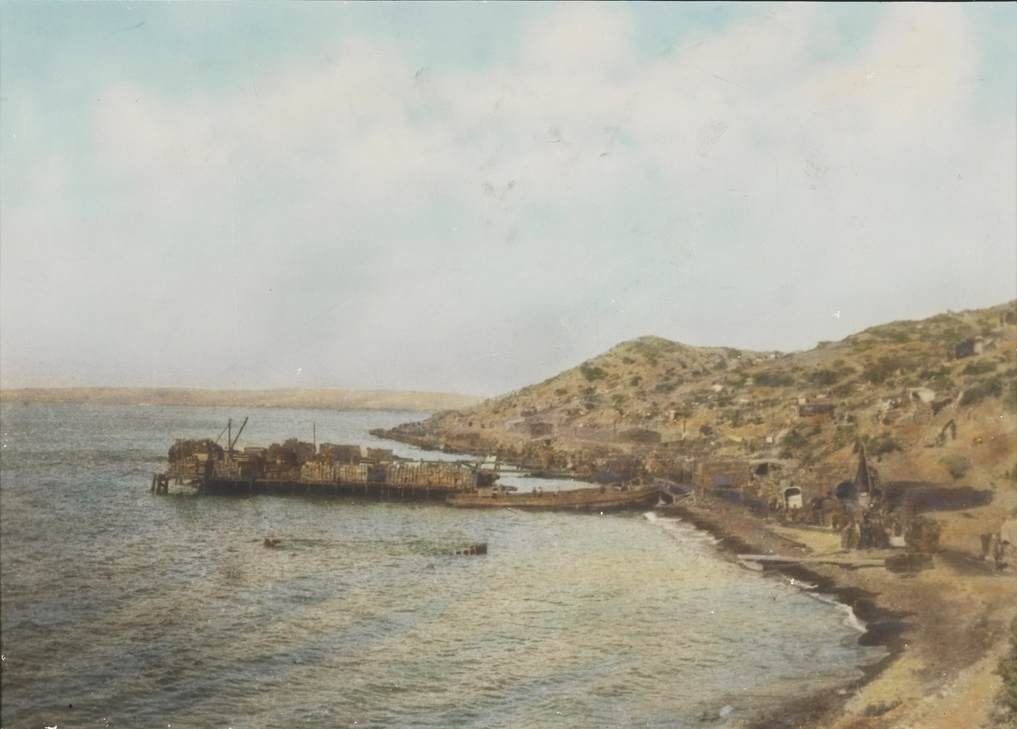
Anzac Cove in 1915.

On 7 June, 13th (Western) Division received warning orders for service in the Mediterranean theatre, where the Allies had landed at Gallipoli the previous month. Embarkation orders followed on 10 June and the battalion sailed from Avonmouth Docks on 19 June. The troopships went via Alexandria to Mudros, and on 11 July the battalion landed on Y Beach at Cape Helles. The division was to relieve Regular Army units of the 29th Division holding the left of the line. 7th Gloucesters was in reserve, then on 16–17 July B and C Companies went into the firing line attached to 9th Bn Worcestershire Regiment. The whole battalion relieved 9th Worcesters on 18 July, and were relieved in turn by 9th Worcesters on 21 July to go into Brigade Reserve. C and D Companies were in support of 7th Bn North Staffordshire Regiment, and on 23 July C Company moved into the firing line and assisted 7th North Staffords in forcing back a Turkish attack. After another rotation with 9th Worcesters the battalion embarked from Gully Beach and returned to Mudros on 29 July. Its casualties so far had been 29 wounded.

=== Chunuk Bair ===
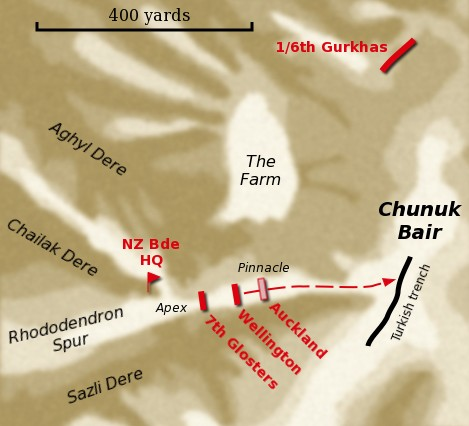
The attack on Chunuk Bair.

After this introduction to Trench warfare 13th (W) Division was landed in secrecy at Anzac Cove between 3 and 5 August. For the coming Battle of Sari Bair, the division was assigned to support the attack on Chunuk Bair by the New Zealand and Australian Division beginning on the night of 6/7 August. The New Zealand Brigade fell behind schedule and made little progress on 7 August, while 39th Brigade got lost in broad daylight. 7th Gloucesters spent the night on Rhodedendron Spur, half-way to Chunuk Bair. The attack was renewed at 03.00 on 8 August, the Wellington Battalion leading, with 7th Gloucesters moving off on their left at 04.15 with B and D Companies in the first line, A and C in the second. They found the Chunuk Bair hilltop virtually undefended after a naval bombardment, but were subjected to enfilade fire from the neighbouring Hill Q, which was still resisting capture, and the leading platoons of 7th Gloucesters were 'practically wiped out'. Those who reached the top glimpsed the Dardanelles narrows – the goal of the campaign – in the distance, but Chunuk Bair was hard to defend. The Wellingtons' commander, Lt-Col William Malone, made the error of digging in on the reverse slope, which allowed Turkish counter-attacks to get within 20 yards of the position without being seen. (Note: Reverse slope trenches were normal practice on the Western Front to avoid observed artillery fire, but in the Gallipoli hills clear forward observation and fields of fire were crucial.) These counter-attackers could throw grenades into the position without exposing themselves, and casualties mounted while only small parties of reinforcements got through. Lieutenant-Colonel Jordan was wounded in the leg, but got himself propped up and continued firing as a sniper until he was hit again in the face. The battalion held out on Chunuk Bair, but 350 men and all the frontline officers and warrant officers become casualties. (Note: Total casualties were three officers killed and eight wounded, approximately 45 other ranks killed, 115 wounded and 119 missing.) The commander-in-chief, Sir Ian Hamilton, noted that the 7th Gloucesters had been unable to dig trenches deeper than 6 inches (15 cm), but had fought on until nightfall in small parties under the leadership of junior non-commissioned officers (NCOs) and privates. After being relieved on the hilltop, it took the survivors three days to get back to the battalion's new position at Overton Gully. (Chunuk Bair was lost next day to a massive counter-attack led by the future Turkish president Mustafa Kemal Pasha.)

=== Gallipoli ===
The battalion dug in at Overton Gully, still under fire (it lost a further seven killed and 14 wounded from sniper fire on 12 August), before being relieved on 14 August. 7th Gloucesters was temporarily amalgamated with 9th Worcesters between 15 and 23 August while the division was peripherally engaged in the Battle of Scimitar Hill. At the end of the month 13th (W) Division was transferred from Anzac to the Suvla Bay sector, where its units took their turns in the front line. On 1 September the effective strength of 7th Gloucesters was eight officers and 263 other ranks; the arrival of reinforcement drafts brought this back up to 25 officers and 676 other ranks by 28 October. However, sickness was now causing more casualties than Turkish action, and by 1 December the battalion's effective strength had dwindled again to 10 officers and 250 other ranks.

7th Gloucesters continued to serve spells in the front line as conditions deteriorated. On 26 November the peninsula was affected by flash floods and the battalion lost much of its equipment. Lieutenant-Colonel Roger Wilkinson, who had succeeded Lt-Col Jordan in command, was invalided on 27 November. Captain Aubrey Clarke took temporary command but was himself invalided two days later. The battalion was heavily shelled on 29 November losing six killed and 15 wounded, while men were beginning to die of exposure. However, returning sick and wounded brought the strength up to 13 officers and 365 other ranks by 5 December.

By now the decision had been made to abandon the Suvla sector, and on 15 December the battalion embarked for Mudros, the rearguard of two officers and 45 other ranks arriving on 24 December. On 27 December 7th Gloucesters sailed once more for Helles, landing on V Beach on 27 December, the left half of the battalion relieving 1/4th Bn East Lancashire Regiment at Fusilier Bluff and the right half taking over the support line. The last Turkish attacks at Helles were repulsed on 7 January 1916, when the commanding officer of 7th North Staffords was killed and Major Harry Bull of 7th Gloucesters had to take over temporary command of both battalions. On the night of 8/9 January Helles was also evacuated, with 7th Gloucesters sailing from W Beach aboard the troopship HMS Ermine back to Mudros.

=== Mesopotamia ===
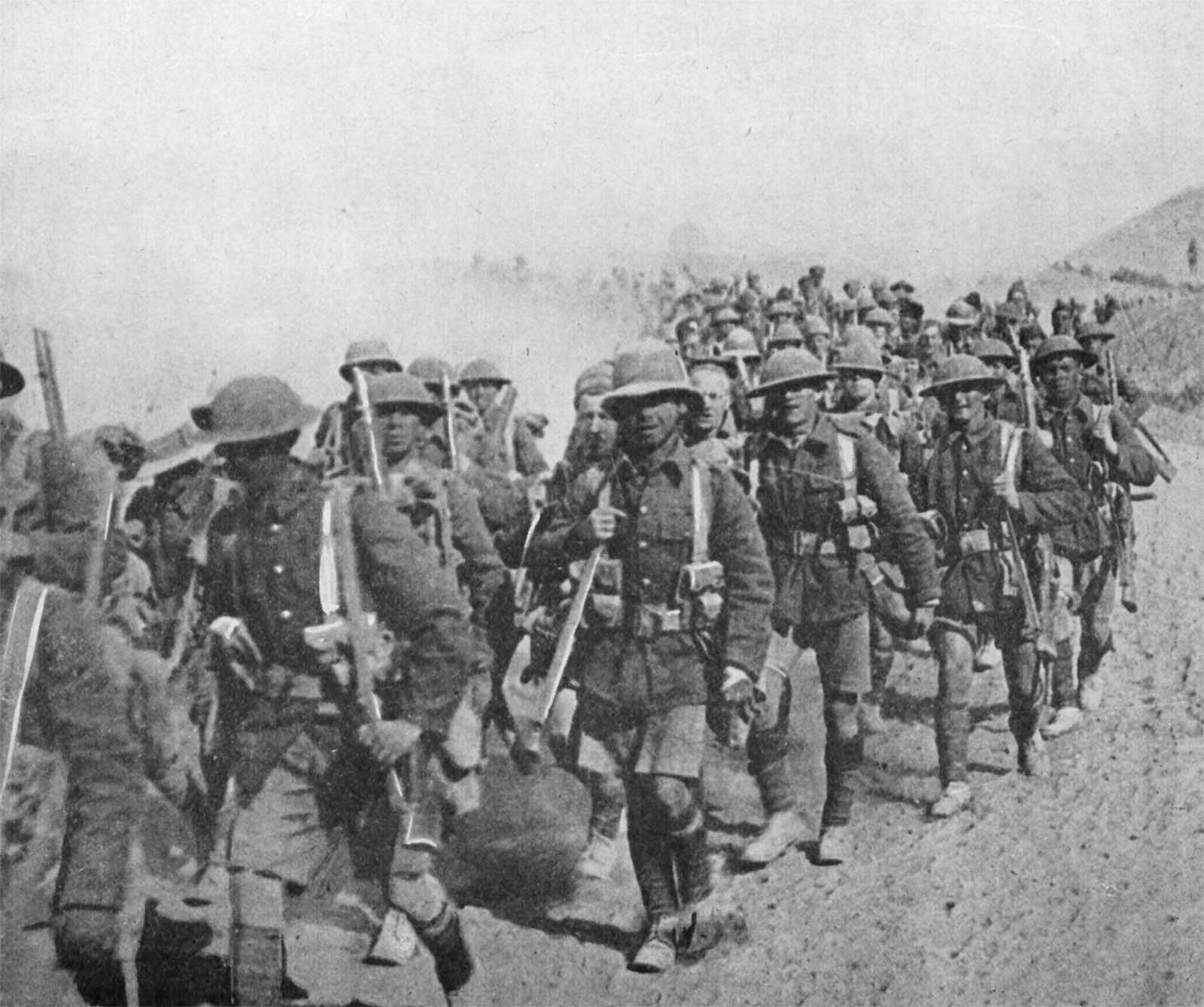
7th Gloucesters on the march in Mesopotamia.

On 18 January 1916 13th (W) Division began embarking for Egypt and by the end of the month it had concentrated at Port Said. Lieutenant-Colonel Harold Younghusband, DSO, was promoted from adjutant of 1/5th Bn Bedfordshire Regiment to command 7th Gloucesters on 24 January. The division took up posts in the Suez Canal defences, but on 8 February it was ordered to the Mesopotamian Front. Handing over its posts on 12 February the first troops went by rail to Suez where they embarked on the SS Simla for Basra, arriving on 27 February. Here there was an outbreak of fever amongst 7th Gloucesters and the battalion was left behind when the rest of the division moved up the Tigris in March. It therefore missed the first series of attempts to relieve the besieged garrison of Kut Al Amara, only travelling up the Tigris by riverboat to rejoin the division on 18 April in time for a renewed attack.

On 19 April, 39th Brigade including 7th Gloucesters attacked Turkish positions at Beit Aiessa across flooded land under a hail of machine gun fire. Well-aimed Turkish Shrapnel shells caused casualties even before the attacking troops moved off. 7th Gloucesters, in the second line, sent up C Company to support the leading battalions (9th Royal Warwickshire Regiment and 9th Worcesters) losing a lot of men in the process. Two days later A and D Companies attacked but were driven back after they crossed the first line of Turkish trenches. Lieutenant-Colonel Younghusband was killed, together with both company commanders; the Staff Captain of 39th Brigade, George Fleming, DSO, was promoted to take over command. After the failure of these attacks, the garrison of Kut was forced to surrender. 7th Gloucesters had suffered 149 casualties, 79 of them fatal, in this short campaign, and many of the men were still suffering from fever.

=== Capture of Baghdad ===
The British began a new offensive in Mesopotamia in December 1916. For 7th Gloucesters the advance had begun on 30 November, with the battalion acting as rearguard for No 3 Column. It had been reinforced to a strength of 24 officers and 768 other ranks. The battalion crossed the Tigris and on 14 December began moving upriver to clear the bank, crossing back to rejoin the brigade at the end of the day. Next day the brigade was ordered to advance, covering 1,000 yards (910 m) under some shrapnel fire. At 15.00 a second advance was ordered, and another 1000 yds was covered under shrapnel, machine gun and rifle fire before digging in. The battalion's casualties amounted to 110, of whom 20 died. They included the chaplain, Rev Reginald Hardwick, killed while out with the stretcher-bearers, and the medical officer, Capt Colin Geddie, Royal Army Medical Corps, wounded by shrapnel.

Lt-Col Jordan, recovered from his wounds at Chunuk Bair, returned to command the battalion in January 1917. The offensive up the Tigris proceeded slowly in the New Year. Advancing during the night of 2/3 February 1917, 39th Brigade encountered strong Turkish resistance while establishing posts close to the river, and two platoons of C Company suffered considerable casualties (three officers and 16 other ranks killed, four officers and 44 other ranks wounded) in reaching its designated position. After holding its position all day, the brigade was withdrawn the following night, apparently to encourage the Turks to remain in a bend in the River Tigris where they could be destroyed. The force continued to work its way towards Sannaiyat. 39th Brigade was so spread out that on 10 February it could only provide A Company of 7th Gloucesters, supported by four guns, to attack some Turkish entrenchments that had been found. As the Gloucesters advanced a dust storm blew up, preventing the artillery and machine gunners from seeing their targets, and the company lost direction. Nevertheless, it continued to advance until within 50 yards (46 m) of the trenches, where the men were forced to dig in. They withdrew after dark, having suffered 119 casualties. (Note: The battalion only reported 73 casualties, of which 49 were fatal, possibly after some missing and lightly wounded had returned to the ranks.)

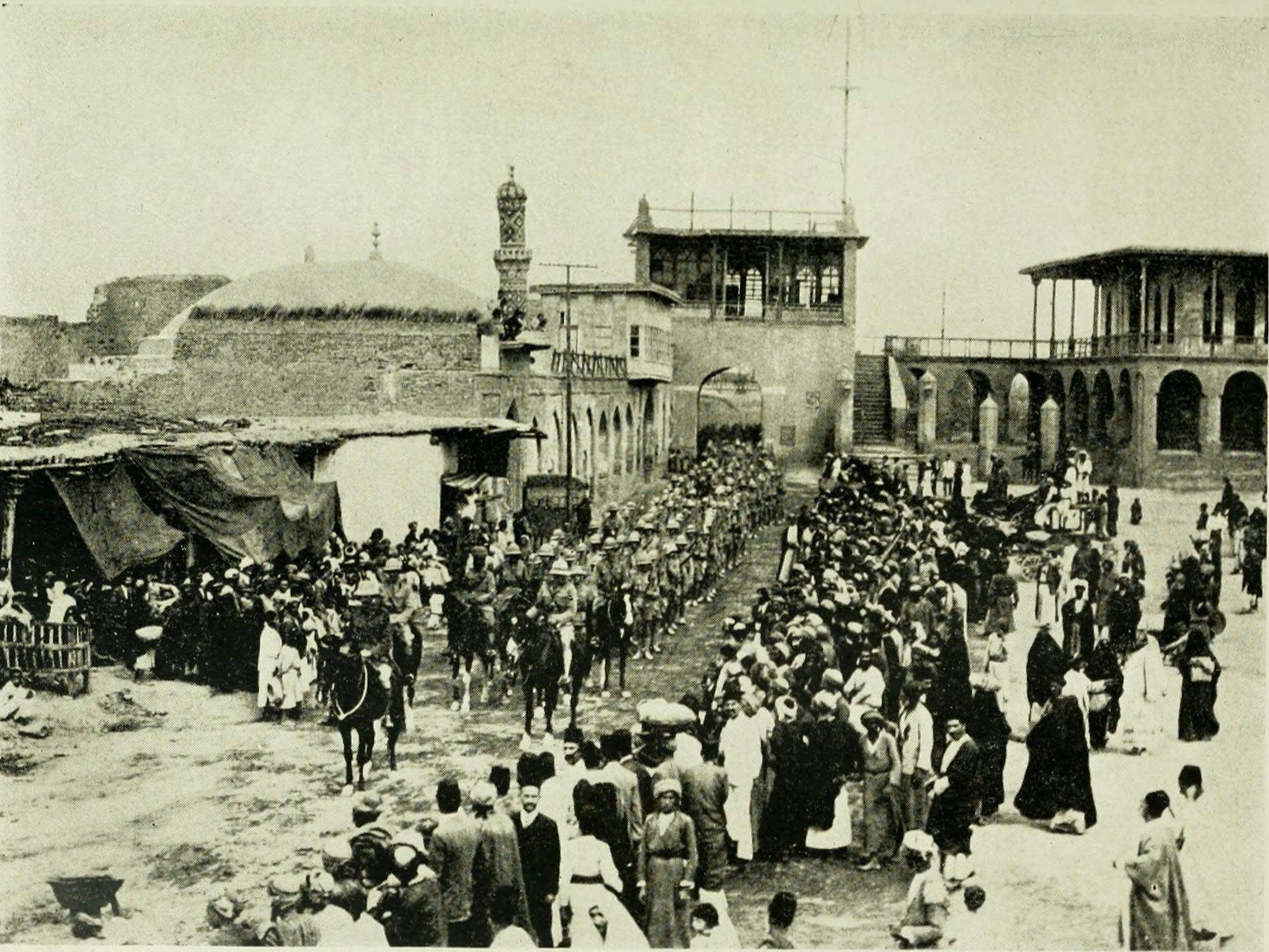
General Sir Stanley Maude's entry into Baghdad, 11 March 1917.

By 15 February Turkish resistance in the river bend collapsed. The British force then forced a crossing over the Tigris (the Second Battle of Kut, 23 February) and by 24 February the Turks were in full retreat towards Baghdad. 13th (W) Division followed up and next day came up to a Turkish position along a series of canals. 39th Brigade was sent round the Turkish flank, with 7th Gloucesters advancing in the centre of the line, and pushed on to take the second line. The Gloucesters met some opposition, but carried on to the third canal line, though here a counter-attack came in and forced back a company until the position was consolidated. The battalion was among the hardest-hit units, losing 111 men during the day. There was no opposition to 13th (W) Division's advance the following day, and although the pursuit was slowed by shortage of supplies, British troops made their entry into Baghdad without a fight on 11 March.

=== Samarrah Offensive ===
British forces were then sent forward to screen Baghdad from counter-attack (the Samarra offensive). 13th (W) Division closed up to the Turkish front on 28 March and established an outpost line. During the night 39th Brigade moved to outflank the Turkish line, with 7th Gloucesters in its first line, and advanced in the morning. The men were rested in the middle of the day while the Turkish positions were reconnoitred, then the brigade continued the advance in the afternoon with 7th Gloucesters in the centre. The attack was carried out over the completely open Marl Plain and drove the Turks out of some ancient ruins, where the tired and thirsty men were ordered to dig in. This battle was known as the 'Affair of Duqma', in which the battalion lost 47 casualties, of whom 11 died. Further actions took place during April to consolidate the Baghdad position.

After the fall of Baghdad the Mesopotamian Front became a backwater as far as the British were concerned, and 13th (W) Division settled down at Sindiya outside the city. Later in 1917 the division was engaged in actions at Jabal Hamrin in October and December. By the end of the year the battalion had returned to full strength, thanks to drafts and returning sick and wounded. On 21 March 1918 the battalion celebrated the Glosters' 'Back Badge Day' (commemorating the Battle of Alexandria in 1801).

In April 1918 a fresh operation was mounted against Turkish forces at Abu Ghraib and Taza Khurmatu, employing a number of converging columns. The 7th Gloucesters reinforced 40th Brigade in Column B2 under the divisional HQ. The columns advanced on 26 April and during the night of 28/29 April prepared to attack. The 7th Gloucesters were ordered up from divisional HQ to reinforce Column B1 (38th Brigade) and caught up with it by daybreak; it remained as reserve during the successful attack that morning. In order to divert Turkish troops away from the Caucasus Front, the British force continued its advance in May to Kirkuk. This time 7th Gloucesters reinforced 38th Brigade in Column B. The Turks evacuated Kirkuk and 7th Gloucesters formed part of the garrison, but the British supply lines were overstretched and having made this demonstration the force withdrew to Dawalib at the end of the month. 7th Gloucesters went into summer quarters at Abu Saida.

=== Baku ===
Most of 13th (W) Division stayed at Dawalib until the end of the war, but on 1 July 1918 orders were received to send 39th Brigade with supporting troops to join the North Persia Force. The brigade group began its move north on 4 July, proceeding via Khanaqin, Kermanshah and Hamadan. The brigade's advanced guards then pushed to Enzeli on the Caspian Sea, where they embarked and reached Baku on 5 August. Here they joined the British Military Mission ('Dunsterforce') that was training Armenian nationalist and White Russian troops to defend the Baku oilfields against seizure by the Germans and Turks. However, 39th Brigade was still badly spread out, 7th Gloucesters only having begun its move on 18 August, first by train, then by motor lorry, reaching Hamadan on 25 August. The main Turkish attack on Baku began on 26 August, and on 14 September Dunsterforce was evacuated back to Enzeli, the other battalions of 39th Brigade (Warwicks, Worcesters and North Staffords) who had been present having suffered serious casualties.

Dunsterforce was now absorbed into the North Persia Force, tasked with preventing Bolsheviks entering Persia as much as fighting the Turks who were threatening Hamadan. By 30 September 7th Gloucesters was distributed on the Zanjan–Bijar line, where it was hit by the Spanish flu outbreak. On 31 October, when the Turks signed the Armistice of Mudros, the battalion was concentrated at Qazvin. On 15 November it reached Enzeli, where the battalion (less one company) embarked with 39th Brigade HQ to re-occupy Baku; the remaining company followed on 9 December.

== Demobilisation ==
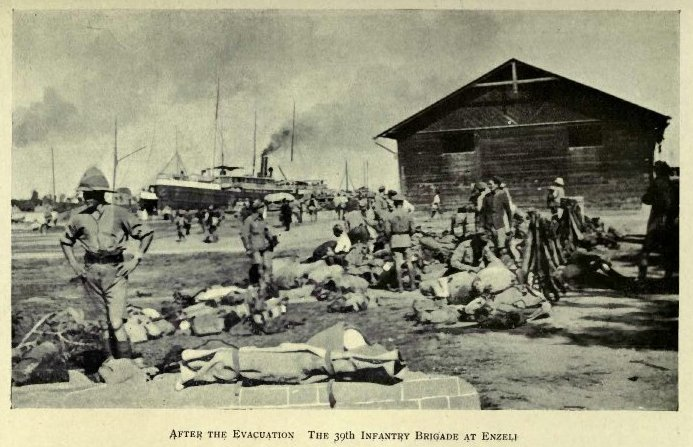
Troops of 39th Brigade at Enzeli after their evacuation from Baku.

7th Gloucesters remained at Baku during the winter of 1918–19 while the complex postwar political situation in the area played out. Demobilisation began slowly, with parties leaving at intervals for the UK. It was not until 13 August 1919 that orders were issued to evacuate Baku. The troops moved by train to Batum on the Black Sea, where they embarked for Constantinople. The 7th Gloucesters reached Haydarpaşa at Constantinople on 2 September and demobilisation parties continued to leave for the UK. On 17 October the remaining personnel of the battalion were absorbed into 8th Oxfordshire and Buckinghamshire Light Infantry of 26th Division in Turkey.

The regimental history estimated that in five years of active service 20 officers and 692 other ranks of the battalion died. More recent research puts the figures at 28 officers (probably including attached officers such as Lt-Col Younghusband and Rev Hardwick) and 707 other ranks.

A new 7th Battalion, Gloucestershire Regiment, was formed in the Territorial Army just before the outbreak of World War II. It served as a home defence and training unit until 1946.

== Commanding Officers ==
The following officers commanded the battalion:

- Lt-Col Richard Jordan from 19 August 1914, wounded 8 August 1915
- Lt-Col Roger Wilkinson from 8 August, invalided 27 November 1915
- Capt Aubrey Clarke acting from 27 November, invalided 29 November 1915
- Maj Harry Bull acting from 30 November 1915 to 28 January 1916
- Lt-Col Harold Younghusband from 28 January, killed in action 21 April 1916
- Lt-Col George Fleming from 22 April 1916 to 14 January 1917
- Lt-Col Richard Jordan returned 15 January to 14 June 1917
- Maj Eric Barnard acting from 14 June to 20 September 1917
- Lt-Col Richard Jordan returned 20 September to 15 November 1917
- Maj Eric Barnard acting from 15 November to 4 December 1917
- Lt-Col Richard Jordan returned 4 December 1917 to 1 June 1918
- Capt Giles Squire acting from 1 June to 15 July 1918
- Maj Eric Barnard acting from 15 July to 28 September 1918
- Lt-Col Richard Jordan returned 28 September 1918 to demobilisation

== Insignia ==
The battalion wore the Wolseley helmet on service, with a cloth diamond, divided horizontally red-over-blue, on the left side of the pagri. However, 'the real distinctive mark of the regiment', according to Lt-Col Jordan, was the Glosters' famous 'back badge' also worn on the back of the helmet.

The formation sign for 13th (W) Division was a black horseshoe with points upwards, but this was only used for signage, transport etc, and not worn on the uniform.

== Battle Honours ==
The 7th Gloucesters were awarded the following Battle Honours:

- Suvla
- **Sari Bair**
- Scimitar Hill
- Gallipoli 1915-16
- Egypt 1916
- Tigris 1916
- Kut al Amara 1917
- **Baghdad**
- Mesopotamia 1916–18
- Persia 1918

Those honours in Bold were chosen to appear on the King's Colour of the Glosters.
