= James Fynn =

Recipient of the Victoria Cross

James Henry Finn
- Born: James Henry Finn; 24 November 1893; St Clement, Truro, Cornwall, United Kingdom
- Died: 30 March 1917 (aged 23); Mesopotamia
- Burial place: Basra Memorial (no known grave)
- Military career
- Allegiance: United Kingdom
- Branch: British Army
- Service years: 1914–1917 †
- Rank: Private
- Nicknames: Jimmy; Little Finn
- Service number: 11220
- Units: South Wales Borderers
- Known for: Recipient of the Victoria Cross
- Conflicts: World War I; Western Front 1915; Battle of Aubers; Gallipoli campaign; Mesopotamian campaign; Battle of the Marl Plain †
- Awards: Victoria Cross; Order of the Star of Karageorge; Mentioned in Despatches

Private James Henry Finn (sometimes Fynn) VC (24 November 1893 – 30 March 1917) was a British Army soldier and an English recipient of the Victoria Cross, the highest and most prestigious award for gallantry in the face of the enemy that can be awarded to British and Commonwealth forces.

The son of a long-serving reservist, serving in the militia, he briefly served in the Territorial Force, and was discharged when he moved away. He did not resume any military reserve service during peacetime, but instead was involved with the Salvation Army in his spare time. As an Economic migrant, he found work in the coal fields of South Wales. and had resided here for the two years prior the First World War. It is for these reasons that this Cornishman ended up enlisting in a Welsh infantry regiment in August 1914. Army bureaucracy recorded his surname as Flynn, then as Fynn.

Finn was awarded the Victoria Cross for gallantry in Mesopotamia in April 1916. He continued to serve with the battalion. Given that he died a year later in that theatre of war, he never had the opportunity to return to his home town, to the fanfare that would accompany the homecoming of a recipient of the Victoria Cross.

== Early life ==
Finn was born in St Clement near Truro, Cornwall. He was the second of eleven children to Frederick John Finn and Mary Baxter Finn (née Uglow). By the time of the birth of the third child, Florence Jane, in 1895, the family had relocated to Bodmin, where they were to remain. His youngest sister and brother were born in 1913 and 1916 respectively.

His father, John Finn, was a self-employed cutlery grinder who served in the Duke of Cornwall's Light Infantry (DCLI) as a militiaman, and saw combat in the Boer War. He served again as a reservist in the regiment, albeit under Territorial Force terms of service, with the 4th (TF) Battalion in India, during the First World War. (Note: Mr. Finn has also had an interesting career in the Army. He joined the old Militia in 1889 and served with the 2nd Battalion of the D.C.L.I. in the South African War. He served two years and eight months in South Africa, being in the Battle of Spion Kop. In 1908 when the Militia was disbanded he joined the Special Reserve, [was awarded the Special Reserve Long Service and Good Conduct Medal in 1909,] and was discharged in 1913 because of his age [of 40]. When war broke out he re-enlisted (in September 1914) and served for a further five years and eight months. He then had the distinction of being the oldest serving soldier in the regiment.) (Note: F J Finn. His service number was 1227, and he held the rank of Private, when he was Embodied in September 1914. In 1917 he was renumbered as 201575. He was Disembodied on 1 April 1919, with the rank of Sergeant. He was awarded a British War Medal and Territorial Force War Medal. He was renumbered on 9 August 1920, 5432036, and was awarded the Territorial Force Efficiency Medal in 1922.)

James Finn had served as a Territorial Force soldier with the 5th Battalion, DCLI before moving to the South Wales Valleys looking for work. He eventually found employment at the colliery at Cwmtillery near Abertillery in 1912. He struck up a friendship with his colleague Willie Townsend, and lived with the Townsend family for the two years prior to the war. The family resided at 8 Winifred Terrace, Cwmtillery, which has been mis-transcribed as Frederick Street in a newspaper article, yet no such named street ever existed.

Whilst living in Monmouthshire, Finn was involved with the Salvation Army, following the creation of its Scout-like youth organisation, known as the Life Saving Scouts. He joined the Abertillery Troop, and advanced to become a Patrol Leader. In a letter to a friend in Abertillery dated Sunday 28 November 1915, written whilst in transit to Gallipoli, he mentions the presence of eight fellow Salvationists on the troopship Olympic, and three open air meetings held on deck that day. His name is on the Abertillery Salvation Army Roll of Honour. His appearance at a Sunday School in Bodmin, whilst recuperating from being wounded in France in 1915, was recounted in his eulogy conducted in September 1918 at Bodmin Guildhall.

== Military service ==
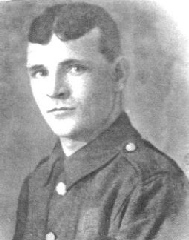
Photograph of James Finn (Fynn) VC

On the outbreak of war in August 1914, he immediately enlisted with the local regiment, the South Wales Borderers. (Note: 'Pte James Henry Fynn, V.C,, South Wales Borderers, of Bodmin, Cornwall, has died from wounds received in action. He was one of the last to join the old 24th Foot before the new armies were raised. Both [Frederick senior] his father — an old soldier with 28 years service - and his elder brother [Frederick junior] are on [active] service [with the British Army].... Private Fynn was awarded the Victoria Cross in September last.') On enlistment, his surname was incorrectly recorded as "Fynn". His surname has been erroneously transcribed as Flynn on both campaign medal rolls.

Whilst his service record has not survived, the campaign medal rolls tell us that he was posted to France on 4 January 1915, to join 1st Battalion. After disembarking HT Kingstonian at Le Havre, then proceeding to the Infantry Base Depot, the draft joined the Battalion on 13 January 1915. Contemporary newspaper articles mention that, during the Battle of Aubers, he was recommended for honourable mention for risking his life on 9 May 1915 in retrieving his company officer, who had been left injured in no-man's land and died of his wounds later that day, a deed with parallels to his actions eleven months later. He was later attached to 170th Tunnelling Company, Royal Engineers. (Several other men of the regiment were also attached to this unit. (Note: One of his contemporaries, who has a surviving service record, was 1/11867 Richard James Jenkins. He was part of the same draft of reinforcements as Fynn. He too was attached, to 170 Tunnelling Coy., from 20 May to 24 June 1915.)) Fynn was wounded in the knee and chest, and invalided back to Britain. (Note: Unearthed by the late Don Bearcroft (1943-2021), curator, Abertillery & District Museum, and reported in an article in the South Wales Argus dated 6 January 2015.) He was recorded in a casualty list, dated 28 June 1915, as being wounded with 1st Battalion. He was admitted to Seaforth Military Hospital, near Liverpool and was discharged in September 1915. (Note: 'When in Abertillery, he resided at the home of [26282] Sergt. Arthur Townsend, 18th Welsh Regiment, 8 Frederick Street[sic], Cwmtillery. It appears that in 1912 Sergt. Townsend's son Willie, who was working underground with Pte. Fynn in the Cwmtillery Colliery, struck up a friendship with him, with the result that Fynn later went to live at his chum's home, where he had been residing two years when war was declared. Pte. Fynn did not wait for asking, but at once enlisted... He served with the forces in France and about twelve months ago was sent home wounded and lay for some time in the Seaforth Military Hospital, near Liverpool. On his discharge from hospital in September 1915, he visited his friends at Cwmtillery, and on completely recovering he was sent to the Mediterranean.') For part of his convalescence, he was a guest of Lieutenant Turner's mother, at her home in North Wales, to repay him for rescuing Turner from the battlefield several months previously.

After recovering from wounds, Fynn was sent in the autumn of 1915 to the Mediterranean with a draft of reinforcements, to the 4th (Service) Battalion, the last unit on his medal roll entry. The draft, commanded by Captain Cahusac, of two more officers, and 135 other ranks including Fynn, embarked RMS Olympic on 14 November at Liverpool, and set sail the following day. He wrote a letter to a friend in Abertillery, dated Sunday 28 November 1915, written whilst in transit to Gallipoli, on the troopship Olympic. They arrived at Gallipoli at the start of December. After the withdrawal from Gallipoli, the battalion was evacuated to Egypt. An eyewitness account states that Fynn worked in the Officers' Mess at Port Said in January 1916. The battalion redeployed to Mesopotamia, disembarking at Basra on 4 March 1916. He acted as orderly to the battalion's commanding officer, Lieutenant Colonel C. E. Kitchin. Fynn kept a diary during 1916. It has survived, and was handed over to the town in 1966. It is currently in the custody of Bodmin Town Museum.

It was on 9 April 1916 at Sanna-i-Yat, during the Mesopotamian campaign (in Iraq), that 22-year-old Private Fynn earned the Victoria Cross for his bravery.

No. 1/11220 (Note: Given that regimental service numbers were not unique, it was decreed that a prefix, being the battalion number in which a soldier was serving, was to be added, effective May 1915. This differentiated him from 11220 Frederick Gunter, 3rd (Reserve) Battalion, South Wales Borderers.) Pte. James Henry Fynn, S. Wales Bord. For most conspicuous bravery. After a night attack he was one of a small party which dug-in in front of our advanced line and about 300 yards from the enemy's trenches. Seeing several wounded men lying out in front he went out and bandaged them all under heavy fire, making several journeys in order to do so. He then went back to our advanced trench for a stretcher and, being unable to get one, he himself carried on his back a badly wounded man into safety. He then returned and, aided by another man who was wounded during the act, carried in another badly wounded man. He was under continuous fire while performing this gallant work.

— The London Gazette, 26 September 1916.

Fynn was decorated with the ribbon of the VC by Lt Gen Sir Frederick Stanley Maude at Amara on 5 November 1916. On 29 March 1917 he was wounded in the leg in an engagement at Marl Plain, 50 miles north of Baghdad. He was taken by stretcher to the field ambulance the next day, but on the way he was struck in the side by another bullet, which proved fatal.

The VC was presented to his father at a public investiture in Hyde Park on 2 June 1917 by King George V.

Fynn was also mentioned in despatches (London Gazette, 19 October 1916). He was awarded the Serbian Cross of the Karageorge (1st Class) with swords (London Gazette, 15 February 1917).

== Legacy ==
His memorial at Basra, Iraq, can be found at panel numbers 16 and 32 on the Basra Memorial which was originally sited within Basra War Cemetery. Whilst his body was never returned to Cornwall he is remembered on his father's headstone in Bodmin Cemetery.

In 1966, Fynn was also remembered at his home town of Bodmin when a housing estate, built over the family home at Downing Street was named "Finn VC Estate" in his honour. A plaque commemorating the event was unveiled, and can be seen opposite the old library in Bodmin. His VC was donated to the town council on 16 February 1954 but is not on public display. As of 2005 his VC was securely stored in a bank vault, and there was a replica of it on display in Bodmin Town Museum.

As part of the WW1 centenary, a new plaque was unveiled in Bodmin in August 2014. In March 2016, a commemorative paving stone was unveiled at Mount Folly in Bodmin.

There are memorials also at Havard Chapel, Brecon Cathedral; St Michael's Church, Abertillery; Town War Memorial, Abertillery.

There is a painting of the action which was published in The Sphere, Tatler, and also The Times Illustrated History of the Great War. The original artwork was by Ugo Matania and is held at the Wellcome Library, London.

== Notes and citations ==
Notes

Citations

== Bibliography ==
=== Primary Sources ===
- Dempsey, James Arthur Dermot. "OC Troops RMS Olympic (1915 Nov - Dec)". War Diaries (Part III - Gallipoli and Dardanelles), 1914-1916. Subfolder within Lines of Communication Troops, archive reference WO 95/4359, compiled by Captain Dempsey as adjutant to the Lt. Col., O.C. Troops, 14 November to 3 December 1915 – via Ancestry.
- "1st Battalion South Wales Borderers". War Diaries (Part I - France, Belgium and Germany), 1914-1920. typed by Lt Charles Knowles Steward, Bn. Adjutant. images 103 to 125, January to June 1915, archive reference WO 95/1280/3 – via Ancestry.
- "4th Battalion South Wales Borderers". War Diaries (Part III - Gallipoli and Dardanelles), 1914-1916. images 36 to 44, December 1915 to January 1916, archive reference WO 95/4303 – via Ancestry.

=== Secondary Sources ===
- Acović, Dragomir (2013). Slava i čast: Odlikovanja među Srbima, Srbi među odlikovanjima (in Serbo-Croatian). Belgrade: Službeni Glasnik. ISBN 978-8-65-191750-2.
- Atkinson, Capt. C.T. (2014) [1931]. The History of the South Wales Borderers 1914 - 1918. Naval & Military Press. ISBN 978-1-78331-077-7.
- Gliddon, Gerald (2005). The Sideshows. VCs of the First World War. Sutton Publishing. ISBN 978-0-7509-2084-1.
