= Anthony Hugh Baldwin =

British Army officer

Brigadier-General Anthony Hugh Baldwin
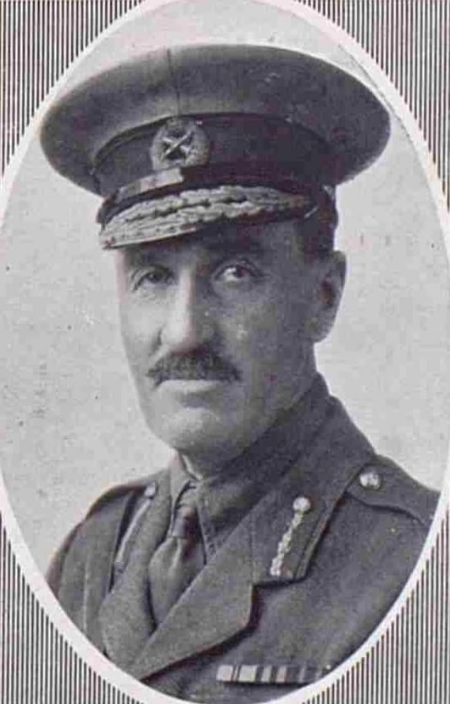
- Born: 30 September 1863; Stratford-upon-Avon, Warwickshire, England
- Died: 10 August 1915 (aged 51) Chunuk Bair, Gallipoli, Ottoman Empire

Brigadier-General Anthony Hugh Baldwin (30 September 1863 – 10 August 1915) was a British Army officer. He was killed in action, with his entire staff, during the Battle of Chunuk Bair in 1915, while in command of the 38th Infantry Brigade. He served for 30 years with the Manchester Regiment.

== Early life and military career ==
Baldwin was born in Stratford-upon-Avon in September 1863 and "was educated at Clitheroe Grammar School and Giggleswick".

His military career began in March 1882 when he was commissioned as a lieutenant into the 3rd (Militia) Battalion, East Lancashire Regiment. He transferred to the Manchester Regiment in May 1884.

He served in India from 1888 to 1895 and first saw active service as an adjutant of the 4th Battalion, Manchester Regiment, in November 1898 and was promoted to major on augmentation in December 1900.

In June 1910 he was promoted to lieutenant colonel, with seniority dated back to February 1908. He commanded a battalion of the Manchesters from then until June 1914 when he was placed on half-pay. He was also promoted to colonel on 1 June 1914 buy with seniority dating back to October 1911.

== First World War ==
He was promoted to temporary brigadier general in August 1914 and took command of the 13th (Western) Division's 38th Infantry Brigade the following month, "which he trained and took to Gallipoli".

He led his brigade during an assault on an objective known as Chunuk Blair on 9 August 1915. It was on 10 August where Baldwin lost his life, as the 38th Brigade's war diary states:

At 3 am. on this date we were heavily attacked by the enemy and subjected to severe rifle fire. This attack, however, was beaten back. At 5 am. the enemy delivered another attack and succeeded in driving our troops back on our right flank for a short distance. However, the position they took rendered it impossible for us to hold the hill above "The Farm" and we were forced to retire. Just before returning Brigadier-General Baldwin was killed.

All of his brigade staff also became casualties. Baldwin "has no known grave; his name is commemorated on the Helles Memorial, Gallipoli".

== Bibliography ==
- Davies, Frank; Maddocks, Graham (2014) [1995]. Bloody Red Tabs: General Officer Casualties of the Great War 1914–1918. Pen and Sword Books. ISBN 978-1-78346-237-7.
