= 13th (Western) Division =

- Active: 21 August 1914 – March 1919
- Country: United Kingdom
- Branch: British Army
- Type: Infantry
- Nickname: Iron Division
- Engagements: First World War Battle of Gallipoli Battle of Sari Bair Battle of Chunuk Bair Mesopotamian Campaign

The 13th (Western) Division was one of the Kitchener's Army divisions in the First World War, raised from volunteers by Lord Kitchener. It fought at Gallipoli, in Mesopotamia (including the capture of Baghdad) and Persia.

== War service 1914–1915 ==
=== 1914 ===
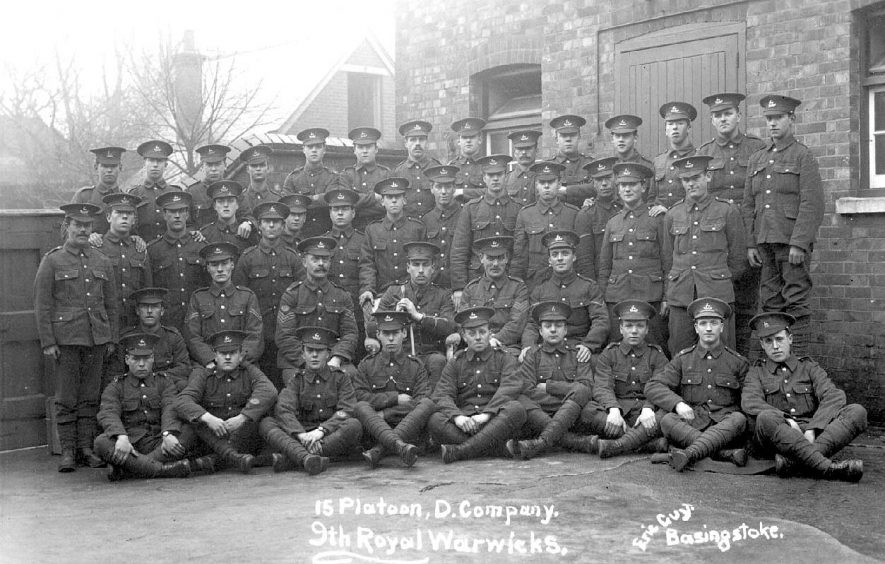
Men of No. 15 Platoon, D Company, 9th (Service) Battalion, Royal Warwickshire Regiment, pictured here at Basingstoke, presumably during 1915.

The 13th (Western) Division was formed as part of Field Marshal Lord Kitchener's First New Army at Salisbury Plain in August 1914. During the formation of the division, Major General Robert Kekewich was appointed as its first general officer commanding (GOC). On 5 November 1914, while on sick leave, he committed suicide. Although meant for service on the Western Front, with most of the rest of Kitchener Armies, it was sent to the Mediterranean to reinforce the Anglo-French in the Gallipoli campaign.

=== Gallipoli 1915 ===
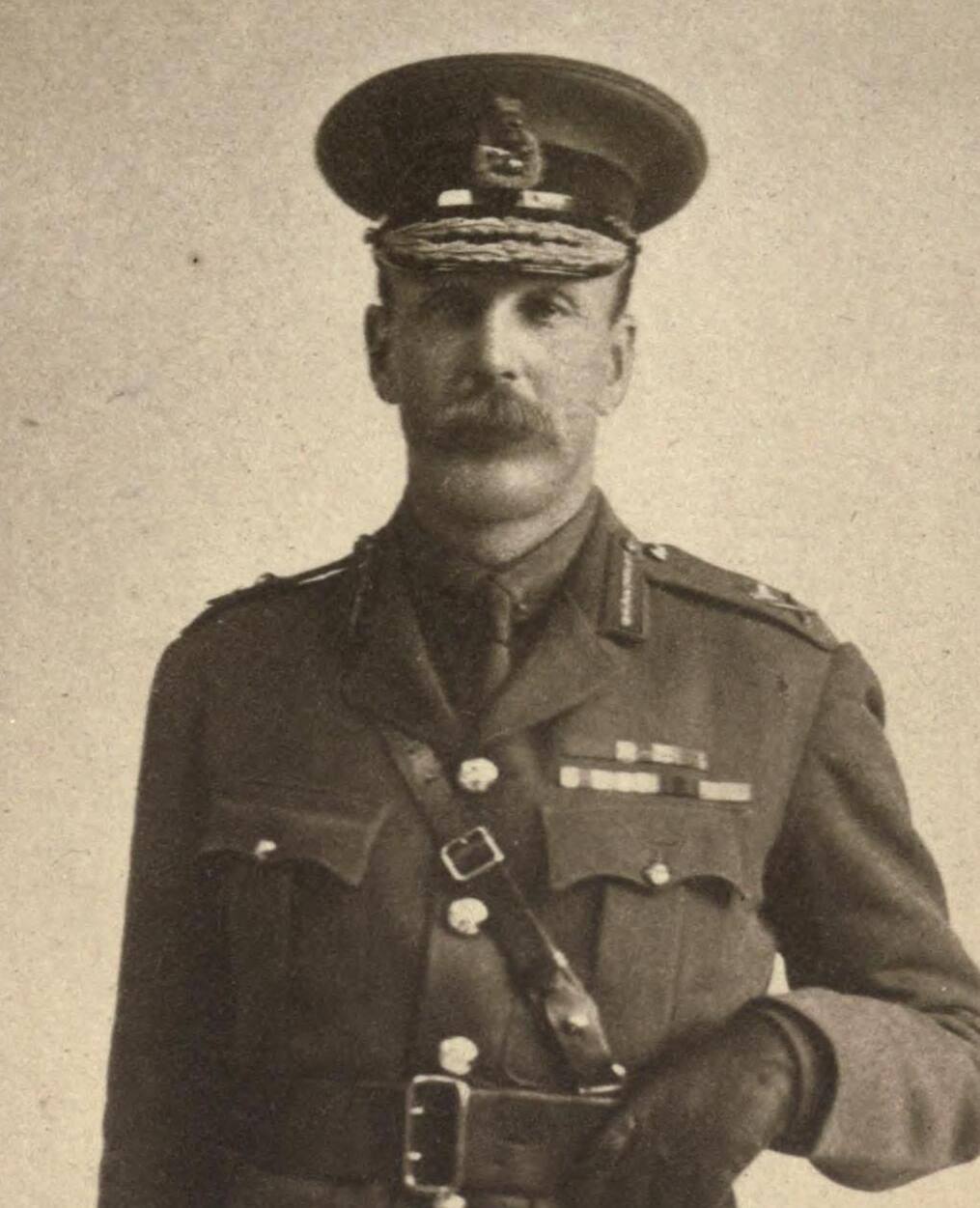
Lieutenant General Sir Stanley Maude, who commanded the 13th Division at Gallipoli and the unsuccessful attempt to relieve Kut in Mesopotamia.

The 13th (Western) Division, now commanded by Major General Frederick Shaw, an experienced infantry brigade commander, landed at Anzac Cove on the Gallipoli peninsula in July 1915 in preparation for the Battle of Sari Bair (The August Offensive) beginning on 6 August. Although all of its component infantry battalions arrived, the divisional artillery did not arrive for some months. Initially in reserve to the main break-out from Anzac by units of the New Zealand and Australian Division, the 38th and 39th Infantry brigades were sent in as reinforcements as the attack stalled.

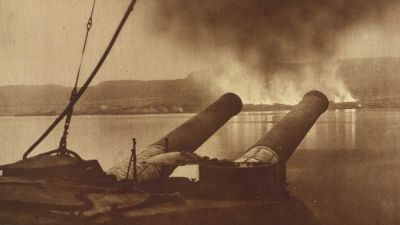
View of Gallipoli from the battleship HMS Cornwallis. The smoke is coming from stores being burned during the evacuation.

The 7th Gloucesters and the 8th Royal Welch Fusiliers were sent to support the Wellington battalion of the New Zealand Infantry Brigade when it made the attack on Chunuk Bair on the morning of 8 August. Battalions of the division formed the core of the force (known as Baldwin's Brigade after the commander, Brigadier General Anthony Baldwin) to capture Hill Q on 9 August but were not in position in time and so spent the day encamped on a small plateau beneath Chunuk Bair known as The Farm. When the Ottomans counter-attacked on the morning of 10 August the 13th (Western) Division troops on Chunuk Bair and at The Farm, suffered many casualties.

On 23 August, Major General Stanley Maude, another experienced commander, took over the shattered 13th Division, Shaw having been invalided home. By September, the division had suffered nearly 5,500 killed, wounded or missing out of its original strength of 10,500 men. Of the thirteen battalion commanders in the division, ten had become casualties. At the beginning of October the division was moved from Anzac Bay to Suvla Bay. Even though the division was once again in reserve, it suffered casualties from Ottoman artillery. The senior Allied commanders at Gallipoli knew by now that the Dardanelles Campaign was a lost cause. To Maude fell the task of making sure that his division slipped away in the night during the evacuation of the Suvla Bay positions. Maude, a methodical commander, recorded,

I do not think we left behind us £200 worth of stuff worth having. I got away all my guns and ammunition and we even destroyed the sandbags which we had to leave in the parapets by ripping them with bayonets or clasp knives to make them useless. The withdrawal was apparently a complete surprise for the Turks, for nothing happened on either night beyond the usual sniping and firing. In a way I could not help feeling a little sorry that they did not find us out, for my division had two strongly prepared lines, each with an excellent field of fire to fall back upon, and if they had only come on we should have given them a real good dressing.

After embarking from Suvla, the division was ordered in December to reinforce the British forces at Cape Helles. No sooner than the division had arrived through W Beach, than the decision was made to evacuate this last foothold. As the division was preparing to fall back to the beaches, it was attacked by Ottoman units in the late afternoon and evening of 7 January 1916. The main thrust of the attack, the first action under the division's new commander, fell on the 39th Brigade, in particular, the 7th North Staffords, defending Fusilier Bluff, who drove off the attackers.

The British evacuation from Helles occurred on the night of 8/9 January 1916. The 13th Division, fresh from its defensive success began to fall back to Gully Beach at 5:00 p.m. By 1:15 a.m. the last detachments holding the divisional trenches were on the beach waiting to be loaded onto transports. At 2:30 a.m., Maude was informed that there were not enough transports coming to Gully Beach to carry off the division. Maude and his headquarters staff, as well as the pickets that had been covering the beach site, had to make the 2 mi (3.2 km) run in the dark to W Beach to be transported out of Helles. Lieutenant General Sir William Birdwood wrote that he considered the 13th (Western) Division was the best division in the Dardanelles Army. Following its withdrawal, the division was sent to Egypt, where it was reunited with its artillery, much of which had been stationed in Egypt.

== War service 1916–1918 ==
=== Mesopotamia (Kut) March–April 1916 ===
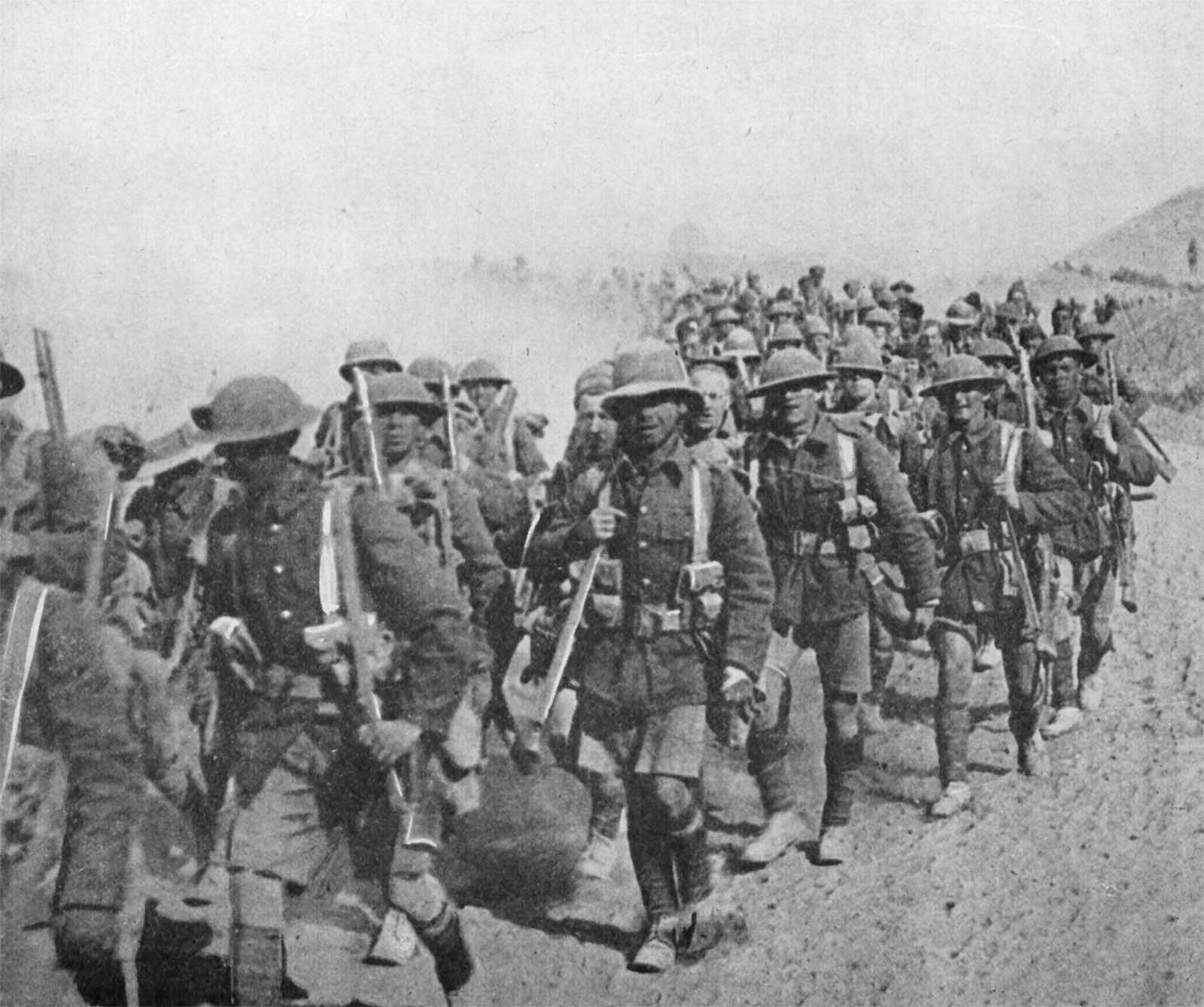
Tommies of the 7th (Service) Battalion, Gloucestershire Regiment, on the march in Mesopotamia. In February 1916, the 13th (Western) Division was sent to Mesopotamia (now Iraq) to reinforce the Tigris Corps. The picture was possibly taken in 1917 because of the prevalence of steel helmets.

After a brief refit in Egypt where the infantry battalions were brought up to strength, the division was dispatched to Mesopotamia (now Iraq) as reinforcements for Anglo-Indian forces attempting to raise the siege of Kut. It took until the end of March for the division to make the journey from Egypt to Basra and then from Basra up to the Tigris to join the rest of the Tigris Corps. The 13th (Western) Division discovered that the supply situation in Mesopotamia was very difficult, port facilities at Basra were inadequate and lacking good roads or a railway, river transport was necessary to move supplies into the hinterland. There was a lack of boats to keep the Anglo-Indian force, which the 13th (Western) Division was joining, adequately supplied.

The 13th (Western) Division brought with it modern heavy artillery, including howitzers and as the strongest unit available, became the spearhead of the attempt by the Tigris Corps to relieve the Kut garrison, beginning on 6 April 1916. The division fought the Battle of Hanna, Fallahiya, and Sanniyat. After taking the first two places, the 13th (Western) Division was stopped by the Ottoman forces under the command of Khalil Pasha at the Battle of the Sanniyat on 9 April 1916. During the fighting on 5–9 April 1916, four 13th (Western) Division men were awarded the Victoria Cross. The first was Captain Angus Buchanan for his actions on 5 April 1916. On 9 April 1916, Chaplain William Addison, Private James Fynn and Lieutenant Edgar Myles were awarded the Victoria Cross for saving wounded soldiers. In three days of battle, the division was reduced to 5,328 effectives.

Exhausted by its three days of fighting, the division became the reserve for the Tigris Corps during the next phase of the operation. On 16 April 1916, it supported the 3rd (Lahore) Division on the right bank of the Tigris, as it captured the Bait Isa line, part of the Es Sinn defences supporting the Sanniyat position on the opposite bank. Taking the Bait Isa line exposed the flank of the Sanniyat position to enfilading artillery and machine-gun fire. On the night of 16/17 April 1916, Khalil Pasha committed his reserves to a counter-attack to retake Bait Isa. The counter-attack struck as the 13th (Western) Division was preparing to storm the next defensive position. Although the 13th (Western) Division and 3rd (Lahore) Division hung on to their gains, the Ottoman counter-attack had taken the steam out of the Anglo-Indian offensive.

With the 13th (Western) Division so depleted, it was reduced to providing machine-gun and artillery fire for the 7th (Meerut) Division when it made the final push to break the Ottoman lines at the Sanniyat. On 22 April 1916, the divisional artillery and machine-guns were used to support the abortive attack by the 7th (Meerut) Division. On 29 April 1916, following the Tigris Corps' failure to break the Ottoman siege and the sinking of the steamer Julnar as it attempted to steam upriver past the Ottoman defenders, the Kut garrison surrendered. At the end of August 13 (Western) Division was withdrawn to Amara to ease the supply situation.

=== Baghdad, December 1916 – March 1917 ===
Between May and December 1916, the 13th (Western) Division refitted and re-equipped, ready for the drive northward to capture Baghdad. In July, Major-General Maude was elevated to command the expanded and renamed Mesopotamian Expeditionary Force. In his place, Brigadier-General Walter Cayley, formerly the commander of the 39th Brigade, was elevated to command of the division. On 12 December 1916, the division advanced from Sheik Sa'ad on Kut. At the Second Battle of Kut, the division helped drive the Ottoman forces from the town. After a brief pause, the division drove north, crossing the Diyala River, and participated in the capture of Baghdad on 11 March 1917. Following the capture of Baghdad, the 13th (Western) Division fought a number of battles to consolidate British control over the Baghdad vilayet. This included fighting at Dellis Abbas (27–28 March 1917), Duqma (29 March 1917), Nahr Kalis (9–15 April 1917), the passage of the Adhaim (18 April 1917) and the action of the Shatt al 'Adhaim (30 April 1917). Despite the relative inaction of the British to advance further, the division also fought at the Second and Third Action of Jabal Hamrin (16–20 October 1917 and 3–6 December 1917).

=== Mosul, February–October 1918 ===
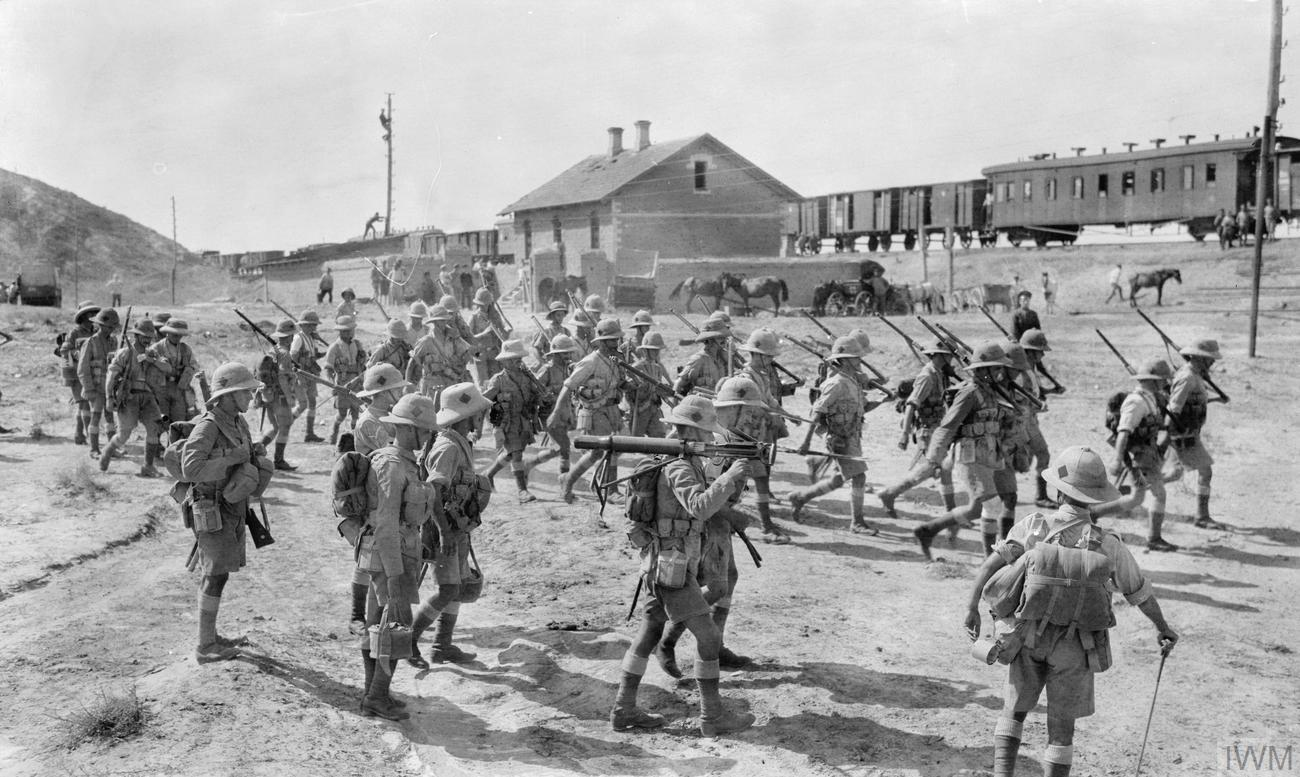
Tommies of the 7th (Service) Battalion, North Staffordshire Regiment, at Baladajar Station in the aftermath of the failed attempt to hold Baku in Persia, 1918.

Along with the rest of the Mesopotamian Expeditionary Force, the 13th (Western) Division remained in the Baghdad vilayet for the rest of 1917 and the early part of 1918. The division fought its last engagement as a division at the action of Tuz Khurmatli on 29 April 1918. In July 1918, the 39th Brigade was detached from the division and be assigned to Dunsterforce (Major General Lionel Dunsterville). The 40th Brigade was detached from the division, along with the divisional artillery, to support the drive to Mosul and further north.

== Occupation and Demobilization ==
With the conclusion of the war, the 13th (Western) Division remained in the Mosul area on occupation duties until evacuated at the end of 1918. In 1919, two of the division's battalions, 6th East Lancashire and 6th Loyal North Lancashire Regiment, were transferred to the Army of Occupation. The rest of the division proceeded to Amara where it was demobilised on 17 March 1919.

== Order of battle ==
Data taken from Moberly 1997 unless indicated. The division consisted of the following brigades (15 July 1916)

- 38th Brigade (G.O.C.: Brigadier-General J. W. O'Dowda)
  - 6th (Service) Battalion, King's Own (Royal Lancaster Regiment)
  - 6th (Service) Battalion, East Lancashire Regiment
  - 6th (Service) Battalion, Prince of Wales's Volunteers (South Lancashire Regiment)
  - 6th (Service) Battalion, Loyal North Lancashire Regiment
    - 38th Machine Gun Company (joined 24 October 1916)
    - 38th Supply & Transport Column Army Service Corps (A.S.C.) (formed January 1917, merged into the Division Train 1 August 1918)
    - 38th Trench Mortar Battery (G Battery joined from 39th Brigade 7 October 1917, renamed 38th Battery February 1918)
- 39th Brigade (G.O.C. Brigadier-General Walter Cayley)

(left the Division between 10 July and 19 August 1918, and attached to North Persia Force)

  - 9th (Service) Battalion, Royal Warwickshire Regiment
  - 7th (Service) Battalion, Gloucestershire Regiment
  - 9th (Service) Battalion, Worcestershire Regiment
  - 7th (Service) Battalion, Prince of Wales's (North Staffordshire Regiment)
    - 39th Machine Gun Company (joined 26 October 1916)
    - 39th Supply & Transport Column A.S.C. (formed January 1917)
    - 39th Trench Mortar Battery
    - G Battery ( joined 13 January 1917, moved to 38th Brigade 7 October 1917)
    - H Battery (transferred from 14th (Indian) Division 8 October 1917 renamed 39th Battery, 18 February 1918)
- 40th Brigade (G.O.C: Brigadier General A. C. Lewin)
  - 8th (Service) Battalion, Cheshire Regiment
  - 8th (Service) Battalion, Royal Welsh Fusiliers
  - 4th (Service) Battalion, South Wales Borderers
  - 8th (Service) Battalion, Welsh Regiment (left January 1915 became divisional pioneers)
  - 5th (Service) Battalion, Duke of Edinburgh's (Wiltshire Regiment) (joined December 1914 from division troops)
    - 40th Machine Gun Company (joined 24 October 1916)
    - 40th Supply & Transport Column A.S.C. (formed January 1917, merged into the Division Train 1 August 1918)
    - 40th Trench Mortar Battery (joined as I Battery 23 September 1917, renamed 40th battery 18 February 1918)
- Divisional Troops:
  - 5th (Service) Battalion, Wiltshire Regiment (left for 40th Brigade December 1914)
  - 8th (Service) Battalion, Welsh Regiment (Pioneers from January 1915)
    - 273rd Company, MGC formed October–November 1917
    - D Squadron, 1/1st Hertfordshire Yeomanry (divisional mounted troops) (joined 8 July 1916, left 20 November 1916, rejoined 3 March 1917, left 3 August 1917)
    - C Squadron, 33rd (Indian) Cavalry (attached briefly in March 1916)
    - 13th (Western) Divisional Cyclist Company, Army Cyclist Corps
    - 13th (Western) Divisional Train A.S.C.
    - 120th, 121st, 122nd, 123rd Companies (left June 1915)
    - 38th and 40th Brigade Transport and Supply Columns, new Divisional Transport and Supply Column (merged and formed 1 August 1918, renamed as 13th (Western) Divisional Train)
    - 24th Mobile Veterinary Section Army Veterinary Corps
    - 10th Field Bakery A.S.C. (joined as first British mobile field bakery, 23 April 1916)
    - 31st Field Butchery A.S.C. (joined 23 April 1916)
- Royal Artillery (Brigadier-General F. E. L. Barker)
  - LXVI Brigade, Royal Field Artillery (R.F.A.)
  - LXVII Brigade, R.F.A. (left October 1915 for 10th (Irish) Division)
  - LXVIII Brigade, R.F.A. (left October 1915 for 10th (Irish) Division)
  - LXIX (Howitzer) Brigade, R.F.A. (broken up May 1916)
  - LV Brigade, R.F.A. (joined January 1916 from 10th (Irish) Division)
  - LVI Brigade, R.F.A. (joined January 1916 from 10th (Irish) Division left July 1916)
    - 13th Heavy Battery, Royal Garrison Artillery (R.G.A.) (left 30 May 1915)
    - 91st Heavy Battery, R.G.A. (joined 7 June 1915, left 1917)
    - 74th Heavy Battery, R.G.A. (joined 24 August 1916, left 23 November 1916)
    - 157th Heavy Battery, R.G.A. (one section attached January–February 1917)
    - 2/104th Heavy Battery, R.G.A. (attached February–March and October–December 1917)
    - 157th Siege Battery, R.G.A. (attached in February 1917)
    - 26th (Jacobs) Mountain Battery, R.G.A. (joined 23 October 1917, left 10 August 1918)
    - 177th Heavy Battery, R.G.A. (joined 25 October 1917, left 29 May 1918)
    - 384th Siege Battery, R.G.A. (joined 25 October 1917, left 1 October 1918)
    - 387th Siege Battery, R.G.A. (joined 25 October 1917, left 24 March 1918)
    - 133rd, 135th, 136th and 137th Trench Howitzer Batteries (joined January–February 1917)
- Royal Engineers
  - 71st Field Company
  - 72nd Field Company (left for North Persia Force with 39th Brigade Group)
  - 88th Field Company
  - 13th (Western) Divisional Signals Company
- Royal Army Medical Corps
  - 39th Field Ambulance
  - 40th Field Ambulance (left for North Persia Force with 39th Brigade Group)
  - 41st Field Ambulance
  - 28th Sanitary Section (joined March 1916)

== General Officers Commanding ==
GOCs
Tenure	Name	Notes
24 August – 26 October 1914	Major-General Robert Kekewich	Died 5 November 1914
26 October 1914 – 15 March 1915	Major-General H. B. Jeffreys	
15 March – 22 August 1915	Major-General Frederick Shaw	Sick 22 August 1915
22–23 August 1915	Brigadier-General J. H. de B. Travers	Acting
23 August 1915 – 10 July 1916	Major-General Stanley Maude	
10 July – 8 August 1916	Brigadier-General Walter Cayley	Temporary
8 August 1916 – 20 May 1918	Major-General Walter Cayley	Seconded to III (Tigris) Corps 20 May 1918; Home on leave 29 June 1918
20 May – 23 December 1918	Brigadier-General J. W. O'Dowda	Acting
23 December 1918 – 17 March 1919	Major-General Sir Walter Cayley	

== Campaigns ==
- Battle of Gallipoli
  - Battle of Sari Bair 6–10 August 1915
    - Battle of Chunuk Bair
    - Russell's Top. 7 August 1915
  - Hill 60. 21 Aug and 27–28 August 1915
  - Evacuation of Suvla. 19–20 December 1915
  - Last Ottoman attack at Helles. 7 January 1916
  - Evacuation of Helles. 7–8 Jan 1916
- Mesopotamian campaign
  - Siege of Kut
    - Capture of Hanna and Fallahiya. 5 April 1916
    - Second attack on Sannaiyat. 9 April 1916
    - Action of Bait 'Isa. 17–18 April 1916
    - Third attack on Sannaiyat. 22 April 1916
  - Fall of Baghdad
    - Capture of the Hai Salient. 25 January – 5 February 1917
    - Capture of the Dahra Bend. 9–16 February 1917
    - Passage of the Diyala. 7–10 Mar 1917
    - Occupation of Baghdad. 11 March 1917
- Dellis Abbas. 27–28 March 1917
- Duqma. 29 March 1917
- Nahr Kalis. 9–15 April 1917
- Passage of the 'Adhaim. 18 April 1917
- Action of the Shatt al 'Adhaim. 30 April 1917
- Second action of Jabal Hamrin. 16–20 October 1917
- Third action of Jabal Hamrin. 3–6 December 1917
- Tuz Khurmatli. 29 April 1918

== See also ==
- List of British divisions in World War I

== Sources ==
- Aspinall-Oglander, C. F. (1992) [1932]. Military Operations: Gallipoli, May 1915 to the Evacuation. History of the Great War Based on Official Documents by Direction of the Committee of Imperial Defence. Vol. II (facs. repr. Imperial War Museum and Battery Press ed.). London: Heinemann. ISBN 0-89839-175-X – via Archive Foundation.
- Baker, C. (2020). "The 13th (Western) Division in 1914–1918". The Long, Long Trail.
- Bean, C. E. W. (1941). The Story of ANZAC: From 4 May 1915 to the Evacuation of The Gallipoli Peninsula. Official history of Australia in the war of 1914–18. Vol. II (11th ed.). Sydney: Angus and Robertson. OCLC 988930216 – via Australian War Memorial.
- Becke, A. F. (1938). Order of Battle of Divisions Part 3A New Army Divisions (9–26). London: HMSO. OCLC 421375028.
- Buchanan, Sir George (1938). The Tragedy of Mesopotamia. London: William Blackwood & Sons. OCLC 1153169819.
- Callwell, C. E. (1920). The Life of Sir Stanley Maude, Lieutenant-General, K.C.B., C.M.G., D.S.O.. London: Constable. OCLC 650459970 – via Archive Foundation.
- Candler, Edmund (1919). The Long Road To Baghdad. CIHM/ICMH Digital series. London and Toronto: Cassell. OCLC 1083476483. 85525-85526 – via Archive Foundation.
- Chappell, Brad (2009). The Regimental Warpath 1914–1918. General Data. ISBN 978-0-98-205410-9.
- Macmunn, George Fletcher; Falls, Cyril Bentham (1996) [1928]. Military Operations: Egypt and Palestine, From the Outbreak of War with Germany to June 1917. History of the Great War based on Official Documents by Direction of the Committee of Imperial Defence. Vol. I (facs. repr. Imperial War Museum and Battery Press, Nashville TN ed.). London: HMSO. ISBN 0-89839-241-1 – via Archive Foundation.
- Moberly, Frederick James (1924). The Campaign in Mesopotamia 1914–1918. History of the Great War Based on Official Documents Compiled at the Request of the Government of India, under the Direction of the Historical Section of the Committee of Imperial Defence. Vol. II (1st ed.). London: HMSO. OCLC 772783874 – via Archive Foundation.
- Moberly, Frederick James (1997) [1925]. The Campaign in Mesopotamia 1914–1918. History of the Great War Based on Official Documents Compiled at the Request of the Government of India, under the Direction of the Historical Section of the Committee of Imperial Defence. Vol. III (facs. repr. Imperial War Museum and Battery Press, Nashville TN ed.). London: HMSO. ISBN 1-901623-05-X – via Archive Foundation.
- Wauchope, Major-General Arthur Grenfell (1925). A History of The Black Watch (Royal Highlanders) in the Great War, 1914–1918 (3 volumes). London: The Medici Society. OCLC 277942489.
