= 39th Infantry Brigade (United Kingdom) =

- Badge of 39th Infantry Brigade
- Active: August 1914–1919; 1951–2007
- Country: United Kingdom
- Branch: British Army
- Type: Infantry
- Size: Brigade
- Part of: 13th (Western) Division; 3rd Division
- Engagements: First World War; Suez Canal; Cyprus; Kenya; Aden; The Troubles

The 39th Infantry Brigade was a military formation of the British Army that was first established during the First World War and reformed in the 1950s.

== History ==
=== First World War ===
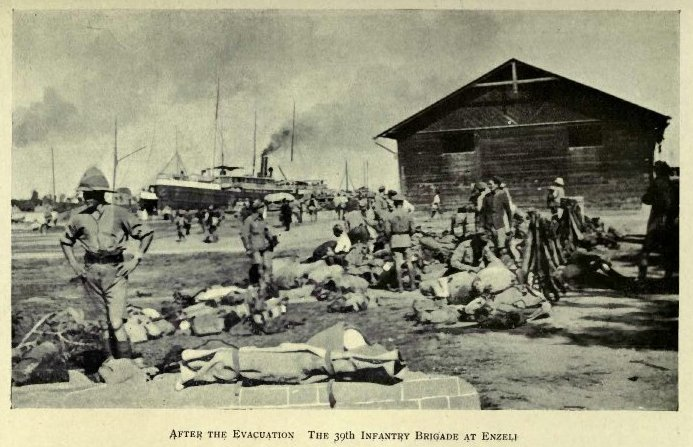
Soldiers of the 39th Brigade at Enzeli after being evacuated from Baku.

The 39th Infantry Brigade was first formed as part of the 13th (Western) Division in World War I, and was with the division in Gallipoli, Mesopotamia, and Persia for the entire war. The brigade was detached from the division on 1 July 1918 and posted to North Persia Force where it remained until 31 August 1919.

The following units served with the brigade:

- 9th (Service) Battalion, Royal Warwickshire Regiment
- 7th (Service) Battalion, Gloucestershire Regiment
- 9th (Service) Battalion, Worcestershire Regiment
- 7th (Service) Battalion, Prince of Wales's (North Staffordshire Regiment)
- 39th Machine Gun Company (joined 25 October 1916)
- 39th Supply and Transport Column, Army Service Corps (joined January 1917)
- 'G' Trench Mortar Battery (joined on 13 January 1917; transferred to 38th Brigade on 7 October 1917)
- 39th Trench Mortar Battery ('H' Battery joined from 36th Indian Brigade, 14th Indian Division on 8 October 1917; renamed 39th Battery on 18 February 1918)
- 39th Small Arms Ammunition Section (joined by March 1918)

=== Second World War ===
The Brigade was not reformed for the Second World War.

=== Post Second World War ===
The Brigade was reformed in the early 1950s in the United Kingdom, and on the reformation of the 3rd Infantry Division on 1 April 1951, the Brigade became part of it, along with the 19th Infantry Brigade and 32nd Guards Brigade. Its first operational summons was in October that year, when it was moved to Cyprus aboard two aircraft carriers, and then on to Egypt. It took up duties in the south of the canal zone with two battalions, the 1st Buffs (Royal East Kent Regiment) and 1st Battalion, Royal Inniskilling Fusiliers. It was joined by 1st Battalion, The Border Regiment, soon afterwards.

In October 1952, it was returned to the UK in order to rebuild the strategic reserve. In February 1953, it was warned for movement to carry out anti-Mau Mau operations with East Africa Command in Kenya. Again at a strength of two battalions, 1st Buffs being joined by 1st Battalion, The Devonshire Regiment, it arrived in April 1953 and was soon deployed in Kenya's Rift Valley, commanded by Brigadier J.W. Tweedie. After over a year of operations, both the Buffs and Devons were withdrawn and relieved in December 1954 and January 1955, respectively. Reliefs were 1st Battalion King's Own Yorkshire Light Infantry and 1st Battalion The Rifle Brigade. The Brigade left Kenya in 1956 for Northern Ireland.

Having been withdrawn from Kenya, the Brigade HQ under Brigadier C.H. ('Monkey') Blacker was dispatched to Aden from Northern Ireland in May 1964, to relieve HQ Aden Garrison in an operational role at Thumier. The Brigade was involved in operations along the Radfan until October, when control was passed to HQ 24th Infantry Brigade.

=== Northern Ireland ===
Back in the UK, the Brigade joined the reforming 5th Infantry Division on its establishment on 1 April 1968. From August 1969, the Brigade, as 39 Airportable Brigade, was involved in The Troubles in Northern Ireland, eventually taking on responsibility, under HQ Northern Ireland, for an area including Belfast and the eastern side of the province, but excluding the South Armagh border region. From September 1970, it was commanded by (then) Brigadier Frank Kitson.

Structure of the 39th Infantry Brigade during 1989:

- HQ 39th Infantry Brigade & 213th Signal Squadron, Royal Signals, Lisburn
  - 1st Bn, The Black Watch (Royal Highland Regiment), Ballykinler
  - 3rd Bn, Queen's Regiment, RAF Aldergrove
  - 3rd Bn, Parachute Regiment, Belfast
  - 1st/9th Bn, Ulster Defence Regiment
  - 3rd Bn, Ulster Defence Regiment
  - 7th/10th Bn, Ulster Defence Regiment
  - 33rd Independent Field Squadron, Royal Engineers, Antrim

The Brigade took on some units from 3 Brigade when that brigade was disbanded on 1 September 2004. The HQ 8 Infantry Brigade based in Shackleton Barracks, Ballykelly, County Londonderry was disbanded and handed over responsibility to HQ 39 Infantry Brigade at Thiepval Barracks in Lisburn on 1 September 2006.

On 1 August 2007, the Brigade was amalgamated with 107 (Ulster) Brigade when the new non-deployable brigade HQ, the 38 (Irish) Brigade, was formed in the province.
