= Capture of Baghdad (1917) =

Battle of the Mesopotamian Campaign of WWI

- Part of the Mesopotamian campaign of World War I
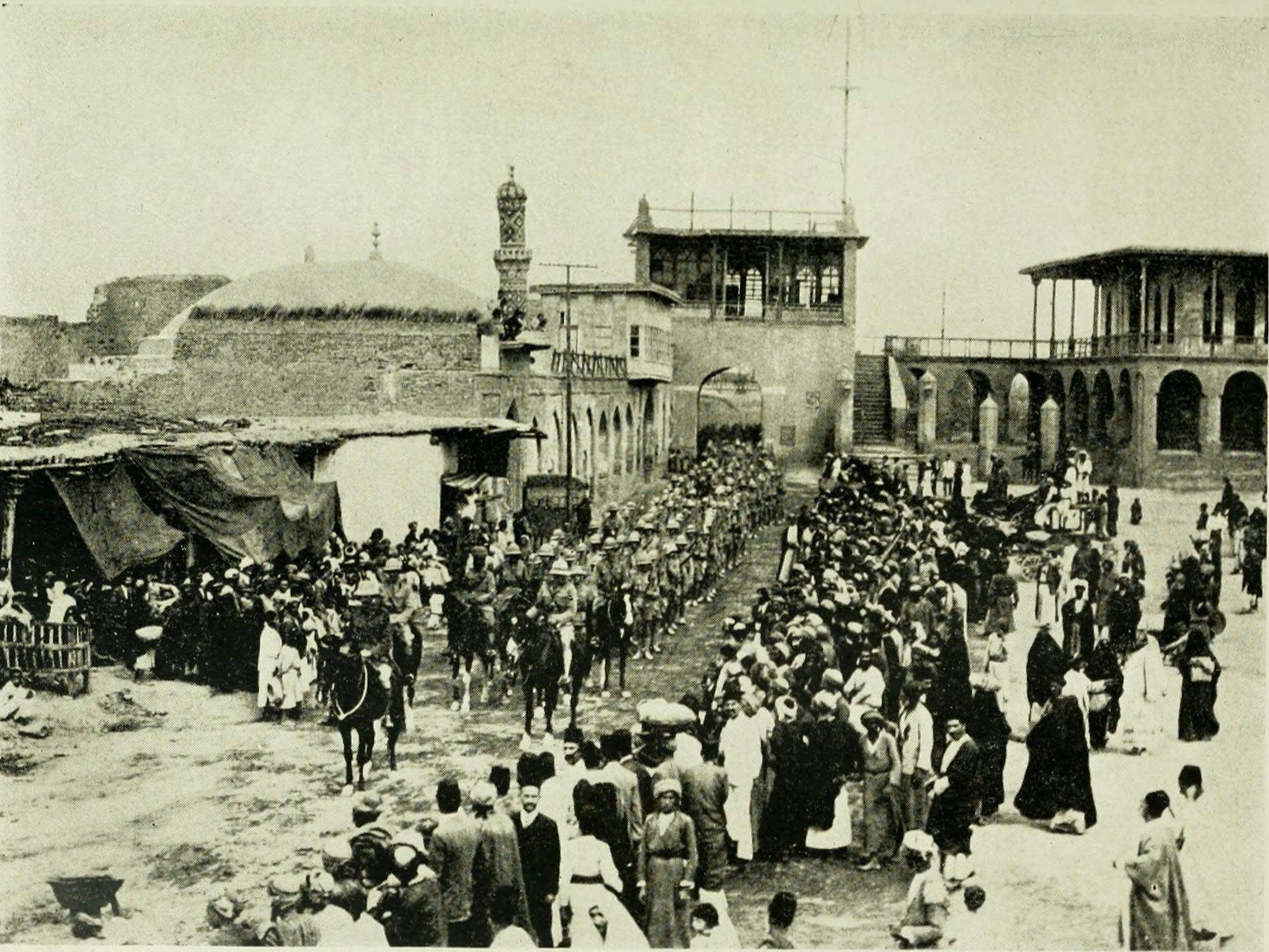
- General Maude's entry into Baghdad, 11 March 1917
Date	8–11 March 1917
Location	Diyala River, just below Baghdad, Ottoman Iraq
Result	British victory
Territorial changes	British capture and occupation of Baghdad

Belligerents
United Kingdom	Ottoman Empire

Commanders and leaders
(United Kingdom) Stanley Maude	(Ottoman Empire) Halil Pasha

Strength
I Corps; III Corps (70,000 men)	Sixth Army (25,000 men)

Casualties and losses
Unknown	9,000+ captured

The capture of Baghdad (11 March 1917) occurred during the Mesopotamian campaign, fought between the forces of the British Empire and the Ottoman Empire in World War I.

== Arrival of General Sir Frederick Stanley Maude ==
After the surrender of the Kut garrison on 29 April 1916, the British Army in Ottoman Iraq underwent a major overhaul. A new commander, Lieutenant General Sir Frederick Stanley Maude, was given the job of restoring Britain's military reputation.

General Maude spent the rest of 1916 rebuilding his army. Most of his troops were recruited in India and then sent by sea to Basra. While these troops were being trained, British military engineers built a field railway from the coast up to Basra and beyond. General Maude also obtained a small force of armed river boats and river supply ships.

The British launched their new campaign on 13 December 1916. The British had some 50,000 well-trained and well-equipped troops: mostly British India troops of the Indian Expeditionary Force D together with the 13th (Western) Division of the British Army forming the Mesopotamia Expeditionary Force. The Indian divisions of the Indian III Corps (also called the Tigris Corps) included British Army units. The Ottoman forces were smaller, perhaps around 25,000 strong under the overall command of General Khalil Pasha.

== March on Baghdad ==
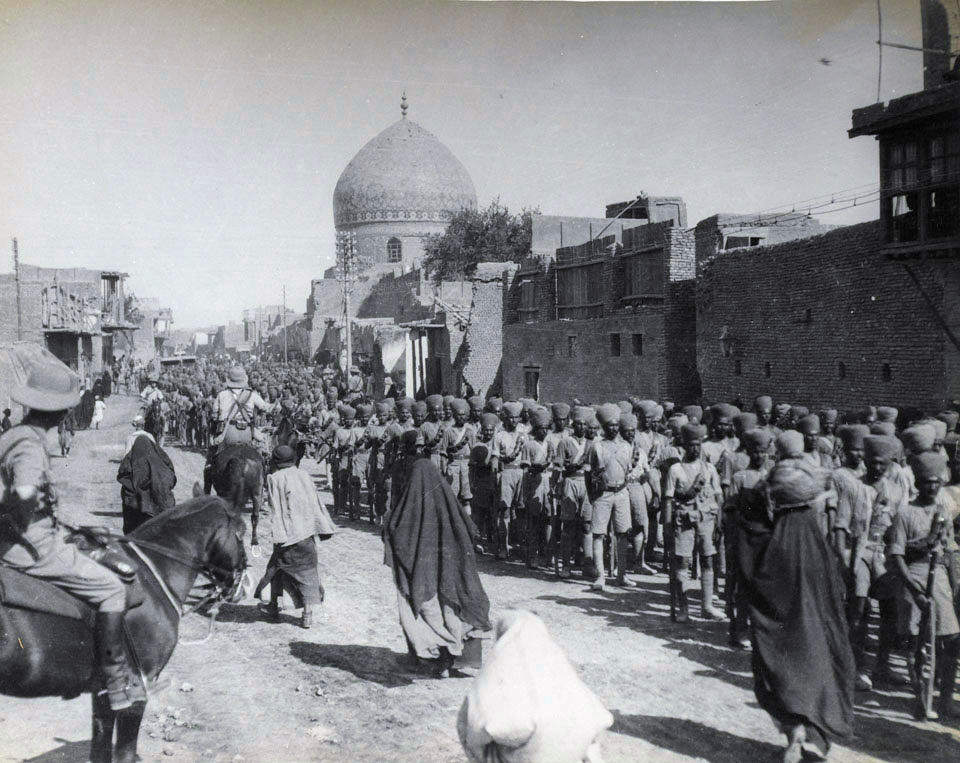
Indian troops march into Baghdad, 11 March 1917

There were no setbacks for the British on this campaign. General Maude proceeded cautiously, advancing on both sides of the Tigris River. He earned his nickname Systematic Joe. The Ottoman forces contested a fortified place called the Khadairi Bend which the British captured after two weeks of siege work (6 January to 19 January 1917). The British then had to force the Ottoman forces out of a strong defensive line along the Hai River. This took them two more weeks (from 25 January till 4 February). Another Ottoman position, called Dahra Bend, was taken on 16 February. Finally, the British re-captured Kut on 24 February 1917 in the Second Battle of Kut.

The local Ottoman commander, Karabekir Bey, did not let his army become trapped in Kut, as General Townshend had been in the First Battle of Kut.

The march on Baghdad resumed on 5 March 1917. Three days later, Maude's corps reached the Diyala River on the outskirts of the city.

Khalil Pasha chose to defend Baghdad at the confluence of the Diyala and the Tigris, some 35 miles south of Baghdad. The Ottoman troops resisted the initial British assault on 9 March. General Maude then shifted the majority of his army north. He believed that he could outflank the Ottoman positions and strike directly for Baghdad. Khalil Pasha responded by shifting his army out of its defensive positions to mirror the move of the British on the other side of the river. A single regiment was left to hold the original Diyala River defences. The British crushed this regiment with a sudden assault on 10 March 1917. This sudden defeat unnerved Khalil Pasha and he ordered his army to retreat north to Baghdad.

The Ottoman authorities ordered the evacuation of Baghdad at 8 p.m. on 10 March, but the situation was rapidly moving beyond Khalil Pasha's control. The British followed close on the heels of the Ottoman troops and captured Baghdad without a fight on 11 March. A week later, General Maude issued the Proclamation of Baghdad, which included the line, "Our armies do not come into your cities and lands as conquerors or enemies, but as liberators". Some 9,000 Ottoman troops were caught in the confusion and became prisoners of the British.

The British were worried that the Ottoman government might try to flood the Tigris plain. As it happened, this fear was unfounded. The Ottoman troops never attempted to flood the area.

== Consequences ==
The result was a decisive victory for the British and yet another defeat for the Ottoman government. The humiliation for the British due to the loss of Kut had been partially rectified. The Ottoman government was forced to end its military operations in Persia and try to build up a new army to prevent the British from moving on to capture Mosul.

The British had captured Basra Vilayet near the start of the war in 1914, and had now taken the provincial capital of Baghdad Vilayet. Although good news for the British forces, this caused a great deal of bureaucratic fighting between the British government in London and the British government in India over how to manage the region.

Once he captured Baghdad, Maude was the de facto Governor of Mesopotamia from Basra to Baghdad. Sir Percy Cox, the Tigris Corps Political Officer, attempted to issue a proclamation stating that the province was under joint British-Indian administration, but London ordered Cox not to issue his proclamation and came out with its own proclamation asking Arab leaders to aid the British administration instead.

At the same time, the Indian colonial government had different ideas. After all, they had been the prime movers behind Mesopotamia in the first place. The British government in India wanted this new area placed under its direct control.

This power struggle led to the creation of the Mesopotamian Administration Committee, under the leadership of Lord Curzon. Its main task was to determine who would govern the Basra and Baghdad provinces. Its ruling was a British, not Anglo-Indian, administration for Basra and an Arab authority for Baghdad. The temporary government here would eventually evolve into the British Mandate for Mesopotamia and Mandatory Iraq.
