= Stanley Maude =

British Army general (1864–1917)

Lieutenant-General Sir Stanley Maude KCB CMG DSO
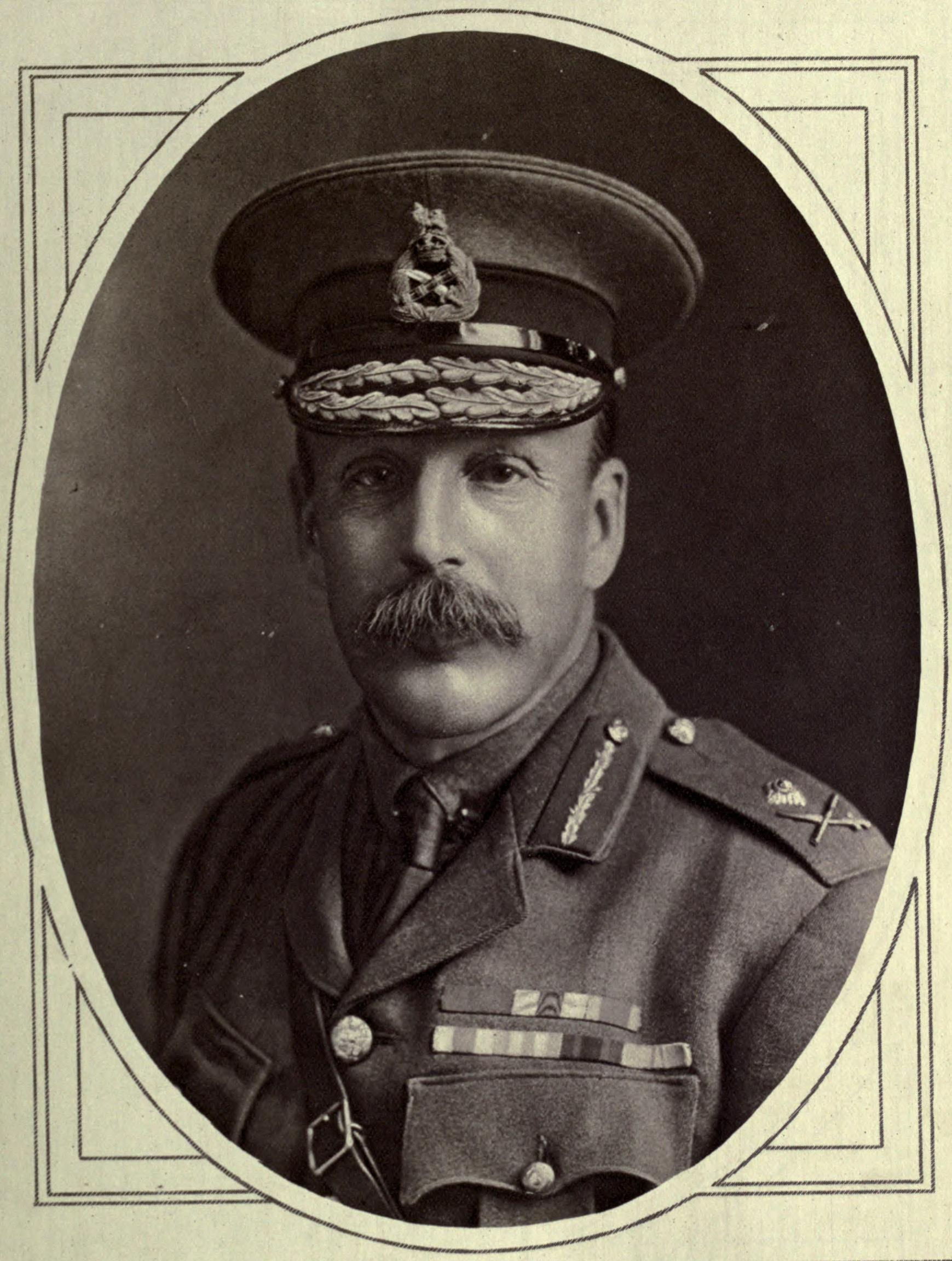
- Born: 25 June 1864; Gibraltar
- Died: 18 November 1917 (aged 53); Baghdad, Ottoman Empire
- Military career
- Allegiance: United Kingdom
- Branch: British Army
- Service years: 1883–1917
- Rank: Lieutenant-General
- Commands: 14th Brigade; 33rd Division; 13th (Western) Division; Tigris Corps
- Conflicts: Second Boer War; First World War: Western Front; Gallipoli campaign; Mesopotamian campaign
- Awards: Knight Commander of the Order of the Bath; Companion of the Order of St Michael and St George; Distinguished Service Order; Mentioned in dispatches

Lieutenant-General Sir Frederick Stanley Maude (24 June 1864 – 18 November 1917) was a British Army officer. He is known for his operations in the Mesopotamian campaign during the First World War and for conquering Baghdad in 1917.

== Early life ==
Maude was born in Gibraltar, the youngest son of General Sir Frederick Francis Maude, who had been awarded the Victoria Cross in 1855 during the Crimean War, and of Catherine Mary, née Bisshopp, daughter of Very Reverend Sir George Bisshopp, 9th Baronet, Dean of Lismore. The Maude family claimed descent from Eustace de Montaut, who came over to England during the Norman Conquest.

Maude attended St Michael's School, Aldis House, Slough, and Eton College, where he was elected to Pop. After attending a crammer, he entered the Royal Military College, Sandhurst. He graduated in 1883 and was commissioned into the Coldstream Guards in February 1884.

== Early service ==
Maude first saw active service in Egypt from March to September 1885, where he was awarded the Egyptian Medal and the Khedive's Egyptian Star. In March 1888 he was appointed an adjutant.

While attending the Staff College, Camberley, where he gained his psc, from 1895 to 1896, he was promoted to captain on 28 August 1895. On 1 January 1897 he became a brigade major. He was promoted again, this time to major, on 5 February 1899.

He next saw service during the Second Boer War, which broke out in October 1899, where he served from January 1900 to March 1901; and for which he was mentioned in dispatches (10 September 1901), was appointed a Companion of the Distinguished Service Order (DSO) and received the Queen's South Africa Medal.

In May 1901, he was appointed military secretary to the Earl of Minto, Governor-General of Canada, in which capacity he accompanied the Duke and Duchess of Cornwall and York (later King George V and Queen Mary) on their Royal Tour of Canada in September and October 1901. During this trip Maude joined the Duke of York and Lord Minto on a duck hunt at Delta Marsh, Manitoba, and for his services administering the tour he was appointed a Companion of the Order of St Michael and St George (CMG) in October 1901. He served on the staff of the Governor-General until Lord Minto stepped down in 1904, when he returned to Britain to become second-in-command at the Coldstream Guards. He then joined the general staff, was promoted to lieutenant colonel in June 1907 and in April 1909 became an assistant director at the War Office, taking over from George Kemball.

Raised to colonel while serving in this role in July 1911, in April 1912 he succeeded Colonel Walter Doran as GSO1 of the 5th Division, a post he held until February 1914 when he returned to the War Office as a GSO1, taking over from Colonel Aylmer Hunter-Weston.

== First World War ==
=== Western Front ===
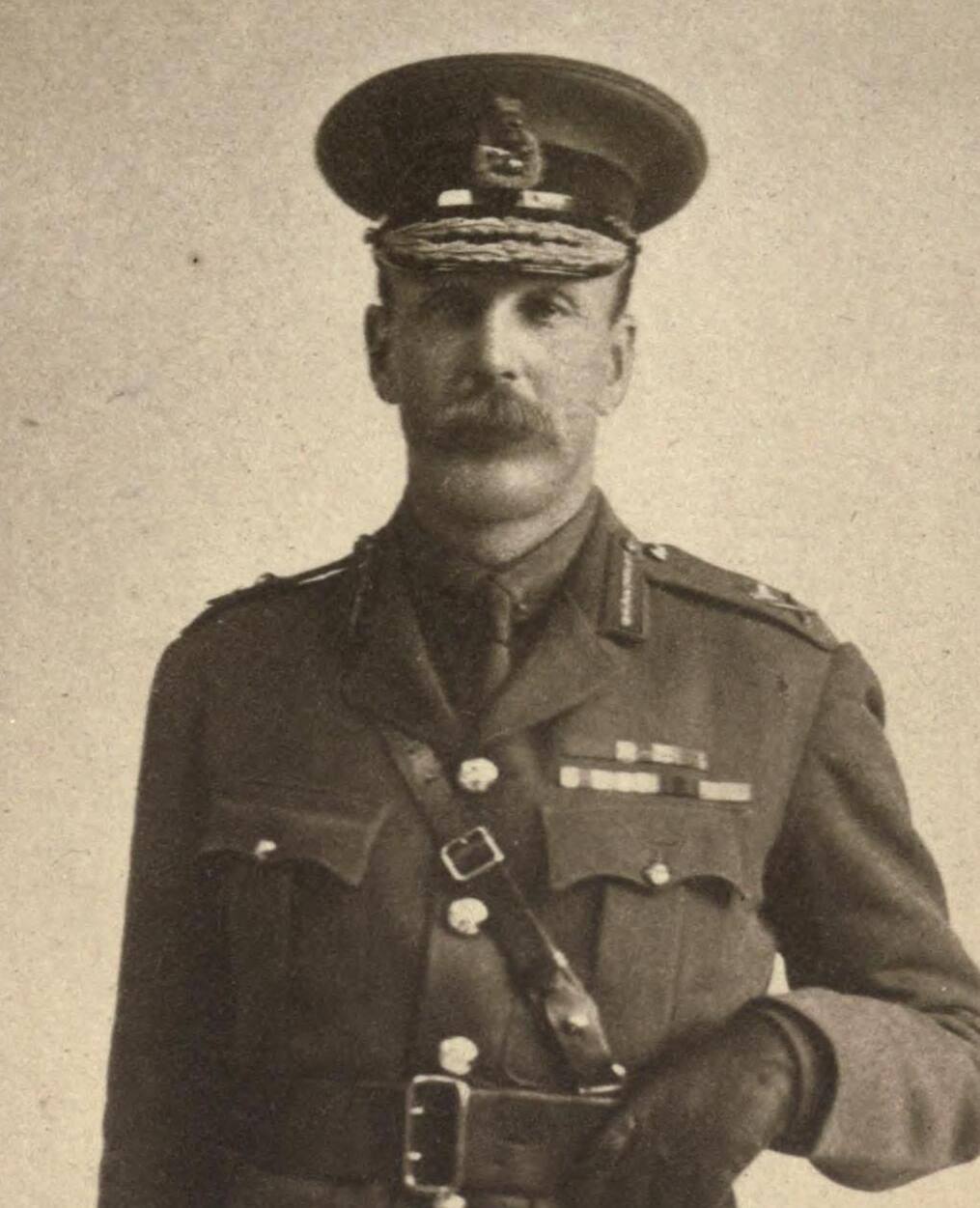
Lieutenant-General Sir Stanley Maude in 1917.

In World War I, Maude first served in France. He was a staff officer with III Corps when, in October 1914, he was promoted to the temporary rank of brigadier general and given command of the 14th Infantry Brigade, part of the 5th Division, in place of Brigadier General Stuart Peter Rolt. He was made a Companion of the Order of the Bath in February 1915 and was wounded in April and returned home to recover.

He returned to France in May and, in June, he was promoted to major general "for distinguished service in the Field" and transferred to command the 33rd Division, a Kitchener's Army formation which was then still in training in Britain.

=== Dardanelles ===
In mid-August, however, Maude was instead given charge of the 13th (Western) Division in Suvla. The 13th suffered heavy casualties retreating from Suvla and landing and later evacuating from Helles before being shifted to Mesopotamia in March 1916. He was the last man evacuated from Suvla Bay.

=== Mesopotamia ===
Maude arrived to catch the end of the British failure at the Siege of Kut where he was promoted to temporary lieutenant general, replacing Lieutenant General G. F. Gorringe as commander of the newly dubbed Tigris Corps (III Indian Army Corps) in July 1916. Despite being instructed to do no more than hold the existing line, Maude set about to re-organising and re-supplying his mixed British and Indian forces. He was made commander of all Allied forces in Mesopotamia in late July 1916, replacing Sir Percy Lake.

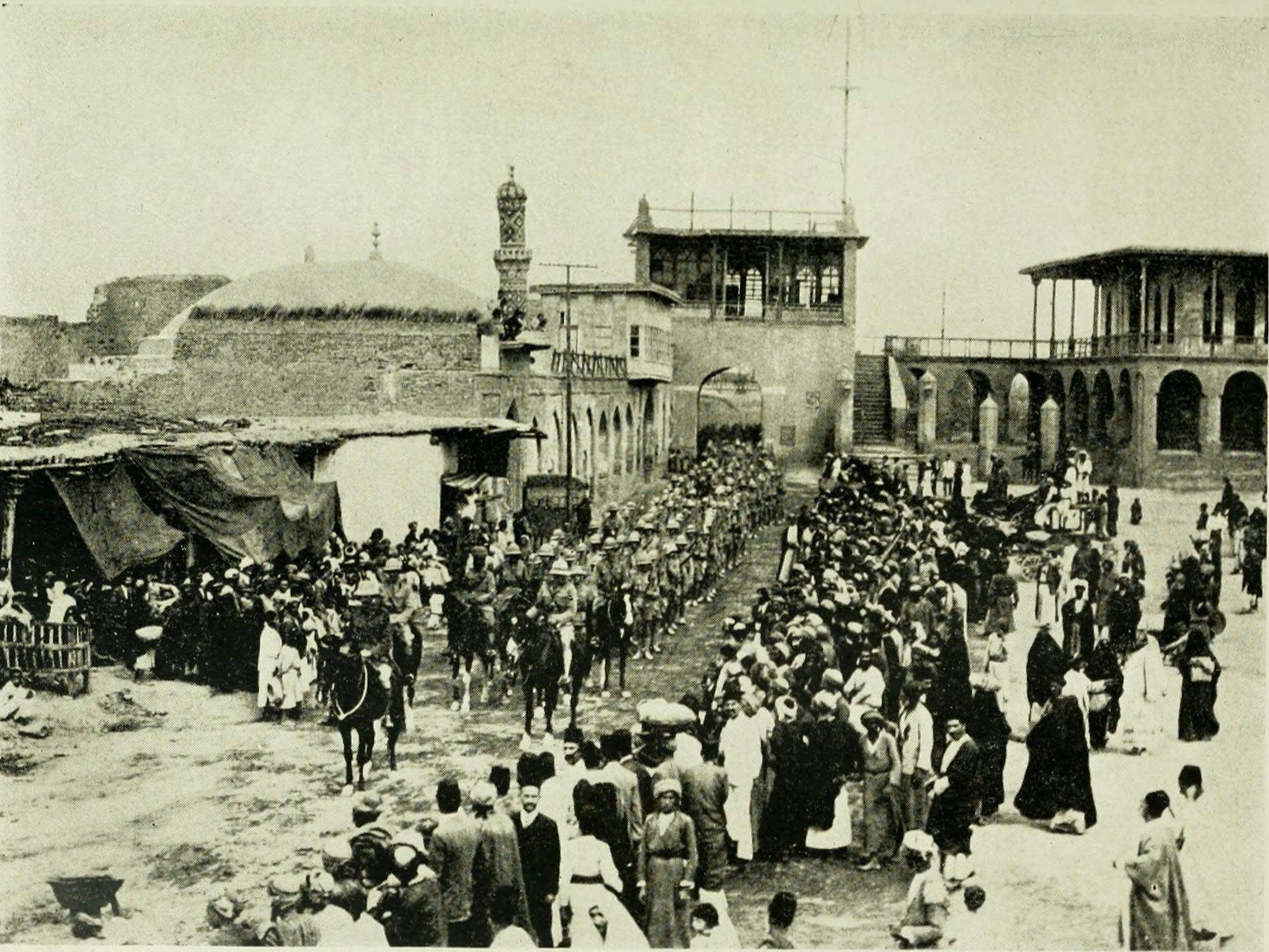
Lieutenant-General Sir Stanley Maude leads Indian troops into Baghdad, March 1917.

Further advances in Mesopotamia were ordered (18 September 1916) by politicians such as Curzon and Chamberlain and against the wishes of the Chief of the Imperial General Staff (CIGS) General "Wully" Robertson. Basil Liddell Hart later argued that Maude clearly "consciously or unconsciously" ignored his secret orders from Robertson not to attempt to take Baghdad. Robertson changed his mind when it seemed that the Russians might advance to Mosul, removing any Turkish threat to Mesopotamia, and authorised Maude to attack in December 1916.

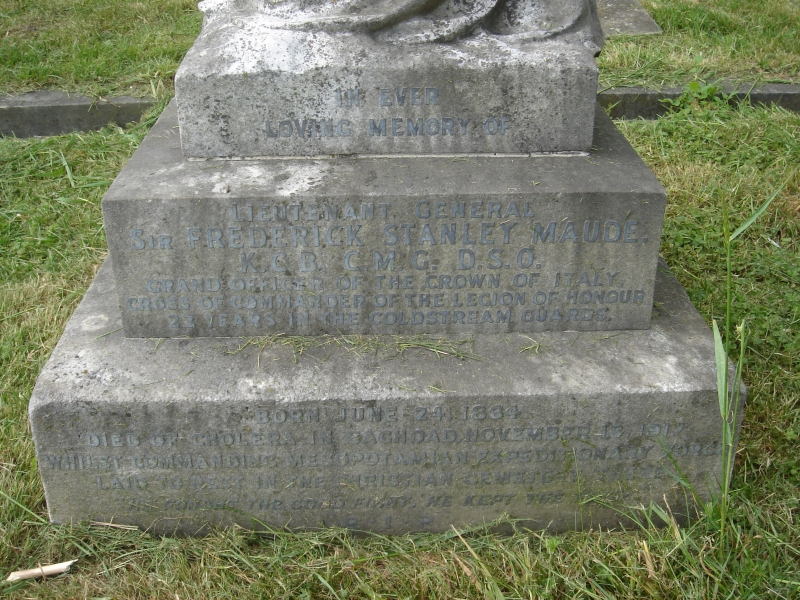
Memorial to Lieutenant-General Sir Stanley Maude at Brompton Cemetery, London.

Given reinforcements and more equipment, Maude directed his force in a steady series of victories. Advancing up the Tigris and winning the battles of Mohammed Abdul Hassan, Hai and Dahra in January 1917, recapturing Kut in February 1917, he took Baghdad on 11 March 1917, shortly after his rank of lieutenant-general had been made permanent, "in recognition of his distinguished service in the field as Commander-in-Chief of the Forces in Mesopotamia". (He issued the Proclamation of Baghdad on 19 March.) From Baghdad, he launched the Samarrah Offensive and extended his operations to the Euphrates and Diyala rivers.

== Death ==
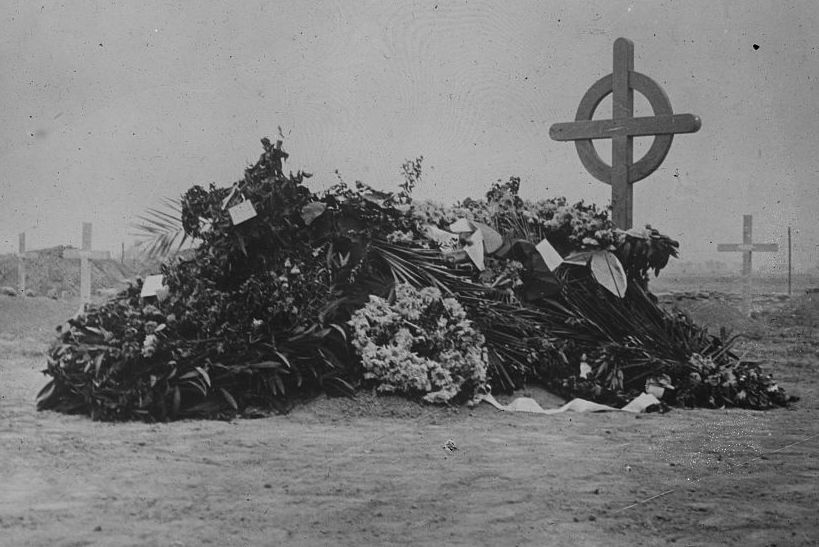
Lieutenant-General Sir Stanley Maude's grave in 1918.

After a lull over the summer, in November 1917, whilst his forces were engaged at Ramadi and Tikrit, Maude contracted cholera (some sources claim it was caught from drinking unboiled milk) and died in the same house as German Field Marshal von der Goltz nineteen months earlier. Lieutenant General Sir William Marshall succeeded him.

His body was buried in Baghdad (North Gate) War Cemetery. His initial grave and marker was replaced by a more elaborate structure and then enclosed in a small mausoleum structure on the walls of which is mounted the standard Commonwealth War Graves Commission headstone. The epitaph on his CWGC gravestone reads:

"'I am the resurrection and the life'. He fought a good fight. He kept the faith."

In March 1918 parliament agreed to a request from the King that he grant the sum of £25,000 to his widow.

== Memorials ==
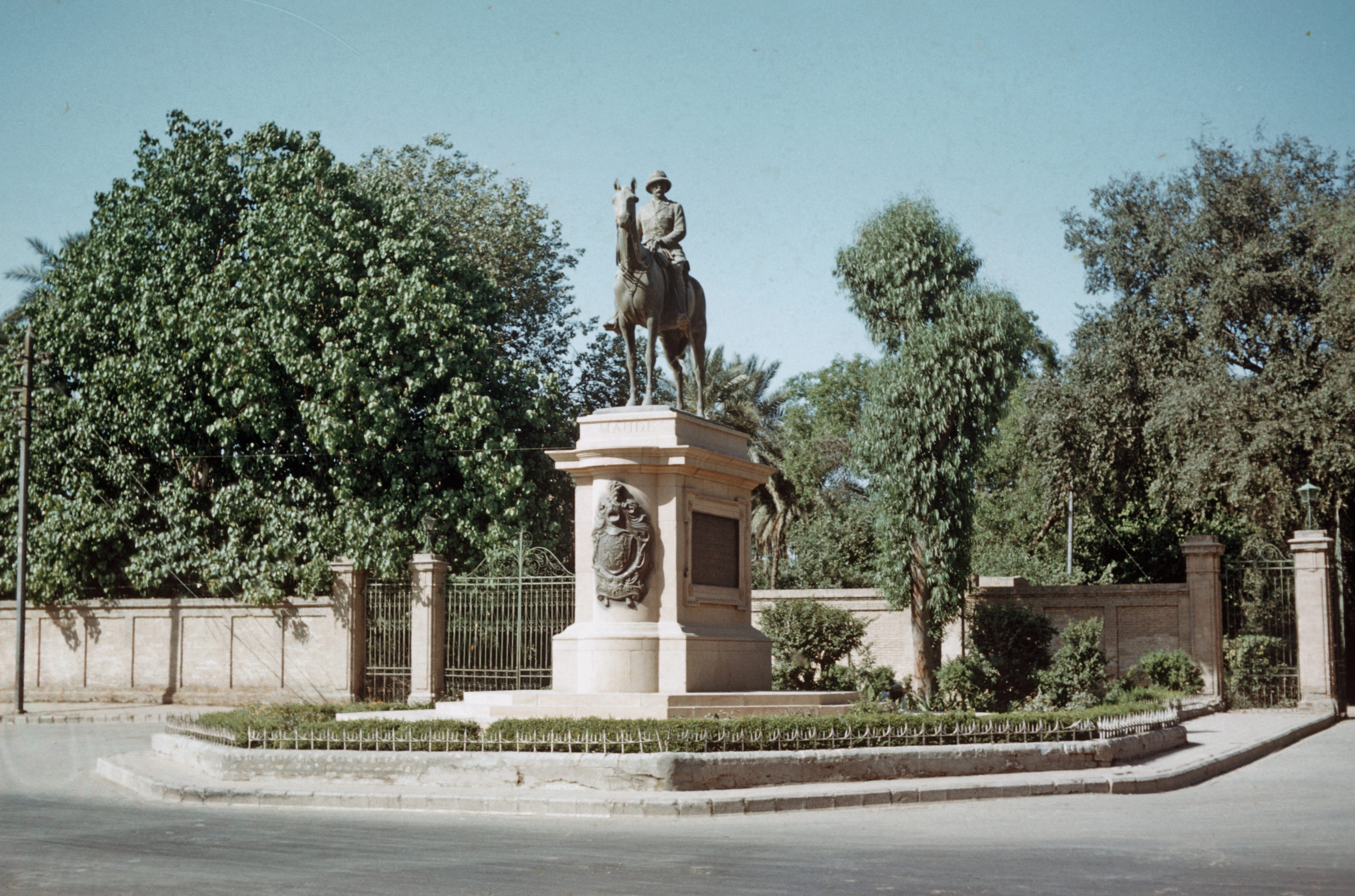
Sir Stanley Maude Memorial in Baghdad in about 1958

Maude has a memorial stone at Brompton Cemetery in London. An equestrian statue of him was unveiled in December 1923 in Baghdad. The statue was by William Goscombe John and the pedestal by Edward Warren. It was unveiled by Sir Henry Dobbs, the High Commissioner to Iraq, in the presence of King Feisal, Air Marshal Sir John Salmond and many others, including the French and American consuls. The statue was attacked and torn down by pro-independence protesters during the Iraqi Republican Revolution of 1958, its subsequent fate is unknown.

Mount Maude, a peak in the Cascade Range, was named for Frederick Maude by Albert H. Sylvester.

== Bibliography ==
- Callwell, Major-General Sir Charles Edward (2024). John Wilson (ed.). The Life of Sir Stanley Maude Lieutenant General K.C.B, C.M.G., D.S.O. Gosling Press. ISBN 978-1874351276.
- Davies, Frank (1997). Bloody Red Tabs: General Officer Casualties of the Great War 1914–1918. London: Pen & Sword Books. ISBN 978-0-85052-463-5.
- Liddell Hart, Basil (1992). History of the First World War. Papermac. ISBN 9780333582619.
- Syk, Andrew, ed. (2012). The Military Papers of Lieutenant-General Sir Frederick Stanley Maude, 1914–1917. History Press for the Army Records Society. ISBN 978-0-752-48619-2.
- Woodward, David R (1998). Field Marshal Sir William Robertson. Westport Connecticut & London: Praeger. ISBN 0-275-95422-6.

Military offices
Preceded by ??	GOC 33rd Division; June–August 1915	Succeeded by George Thesiger
Preceded by Frederick Shaw	GOC 13th (Western) Division; 1915–1916	Succeeded by Walter Cayley
