= 40th Brigade (United Kingdom) =

WWI brigade of the British Army

The 40th Brigade was a formation of the British Army. It was one of the new army or Kitchener's Army brigades, and assigned to the 13th (Western) Division and served in the Gallipoli and the Mesopotamian campaign during the First World War.

== Formation ==
The following units served with the brigade:

- 8th (Service) Battalion, Cheshire Regiment
- 8th (Service) Battalion, Royal Welsh Fusiliers
- 4th (Service) Battalion, South Wales Borderers
- 8th (Service) Battalion, Welsh Regiment (became divisional pioneer battalion in January 1915)
- 5th (Service) Battalion, Duke of Edinburgh's (Wiltshire Regiment) (originally Army Troops, replaced 8th Welsh)
- 40th Machine Gun Company (joined 24 October 1916)
- 40th Supply and Transport Column, Army Service Corps (January 1917 – 1 August 1918)
- 40th Trench Mortar Battery ('I' Battery joined on 23 September 1917; renamed 40th Battery on 18 February 1918)
- 40th Small Arms Ammunition Section (joined by March 1918)
