= 38th Brigade (United Kingdom) =

- Active: August 1914 – March 1919
- Allegiance: United Kingdom
- Branch: British Army
- Type: Infantry
- Size: Brigade
- Part of: 13th (Western) Division
- Engagements: World War I

The 38th Brigade was an infantry brigade formation of the British Army that was active during World War I. It was composed of volunteers of Kitchener's Army and served in the Gallipoli and Mesopotamian campaigns.

== History ==
38th Brigade was organised as part of 13th (Western) Division, which came into existence as a result of Army Order No 324 of 21 August 1914 authorising the formation of six new volunteer infantry divisions (the 'First Kitchener Army' or 'K1'). The division was organised by Western Command and the brigades began to assemble on Salisbury Plain.

== Composition ==
The following units served with the brigade:

- 6th (Service) Battalion, King's Own (Royal Lancaster Regiment)
- 6th (Service) Battalion, East Lancashire Regiment
- 6th (Service) Battalion, Prince of Wales's Volunteers (South Lancashire Regiment)
- 6th (Service) Battalion, Loyal North Lancashire Regiment
- 38th Machine Gun Company (joined 24 October 1916)
- 38th Supply and Transport Column, Army Service Corps (January 1917 – 1 August 1918)
- 38th Trench Mortar Battery ('G' Battery joined from 39th Brigade on 7 October 1917; renamed 38th Battery on 18 February 1918)
- 38th Small Arms Ammunition Section (joined by March 1918)

== Service ==
The brigade sailed from Avonmouth in June 1915 and landed on the Gallipoli Peninsula in July. It was evacuated to Egypt in December 1915. In February 1916 it moved to Mesopotamia and fought in that theatre until the end of the war. It was disbanded in 1919.

== Later formation ==
See main article: British 38th (Irish) Infantry Brigade

In January 1942 38th Brigade was reformed by converting 210th Independent Infantry Brigade (Home) into a frontline formation. It was composed of Irish battalions and was titled 38th (Irish) Brigade. It fought with distinction through the Tunisian and Italian campaigns of World War II.

38 (Irish) Brigade was reformed yet again in 2007 as a component of the present-day British Army.
