= Battle of Hasankale =

World War I battle between Russia and Ottoman Empire

- Part of the Erzurum offensive of the Caucasus campaign
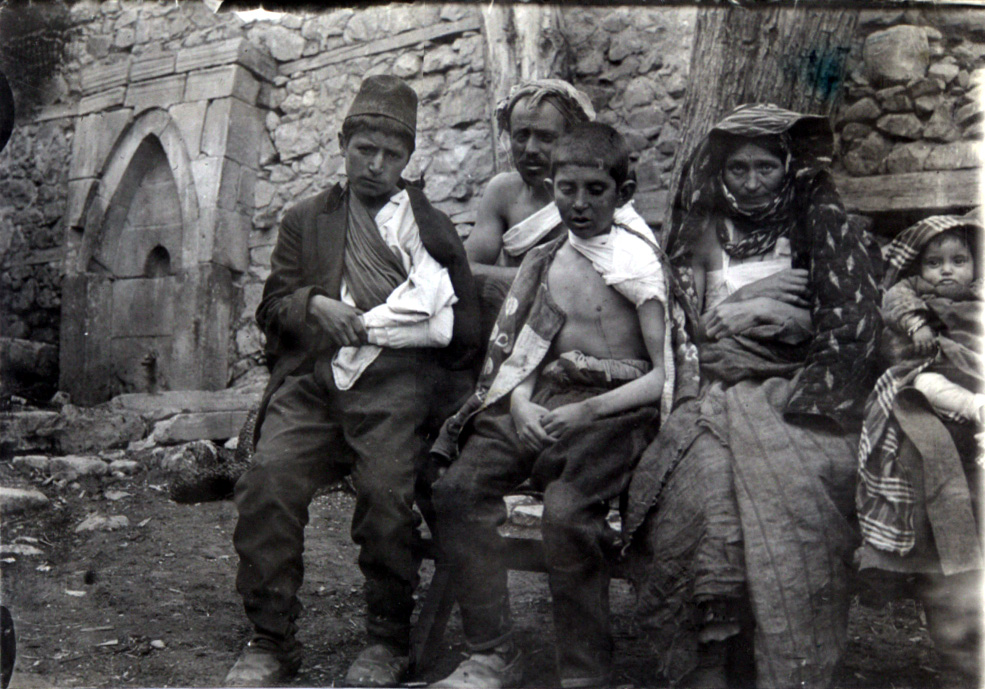
- Wounded muslim refugees during the January 1916 Russian breakthrough.
| Date | January 18–19, 1916 |
| Location | Hasankale, Ottoman Empire |
| Result | Russian victory (Note: "Early on the morning of 19 January, the Siberian Cossacks attacked Hasankale where the Turkish rear-guard of four battalions was completely annihilated. [...] On the road several hundred more prisoners were taken from different regiments of the Turkish 18th and 33rd Divisions of XI Corps; the 17th Division of IX Corps was retiring in the greatest disorder.") |

Belligerents
| Russian Empire | Ottoman Empire |

Commanders and leaders
| Nikolai Yudenich (Note: Army Commander); Pyotr Kalitin (Note: I Caucasian Corps Commander); General Vorobyev | Abdul Kerim Pasha (Note: Third Army Commander) |

Units involved
| Siberian Cossack Brigade; Voloshinov-Petrichenko's column (Note: Infantry support at Timar) | 17th Infantry Division (IX Corps): 4 infantry battalions (Note: Rear-guard engaged in the town); Retreating elements of 18th & 33rd Divisions (XI Corps) |

Strength
| Unknown | 6,000 (Division total); 4 battalions (Rear-guard) |

Casualties and losses
| Unknown | 1,000 KIA (sabred), 1,500 POWs, 4 guns captured |

The Battle of Hasankale was a military engagement fought between January 18 and January 19, 1916, during the opening phase of the Erzurum Offensive in the Caucasus Campaign of World War I. The battle resulted in a decisive victory for the Russian Empire over the Ottoman Empire.

== Background ==
Prior to the engagement, the Russian Caucasian Army under General Nikolai Yudenich launched a surprise winter offensive on January 10, 1916, which completely shattered the frontline Ottoman positions at the Battle of Köprüköy. At the start of the offensive, the Ottoman Third Army's general strategic reserve, the 17th Infantry Division of the IX Corps, numbering roughly 6,000 men, was stationed at Hasankale.

Following the collapse of the Köprüköy front, the commander of the Ottoman Third Army, Abdul Kerim Paşa, ordered a general retreat on the night of January 16–17. The Ottoman forces withdrew westward down the Pasin valley toward the Erzurum fortress system with great speed. Concurrently, Russian flanking columns under Colonel Treskin and General Voloshinov-Petrichenko advanced through the mountains to the north, cutting off the direct lines of communication between the Ottoman X Corps and Hasankale.

== Battle ==
Irate that the Ottoman main body had managed to slip away from his frontline infantry, General Yudenich telegraphed General Pyotr Kalitin, commander of the Russian I Caucasian Corps, ordering him to immediately advance his horse columns to Hasankale to pursue the enemy.

On the morning of January 18, the Russian Siberian Cossack Brigade reached Bekbad and pressed onward toward Hasankale later that afternoon, brushing aside light resistance from Turkish rear-guards. By the same evening, Russian infantry under Voloshinov-Petrichenko reached the village of Timar, five miles northeast of the town.

Early on the morning of January 19, the Siberian Cossacks launched a full-scale assault on the town of Hasankale itself. They encountered a heavily concentrated Ottoman rear-guard consisting of four infantry battalions. In the ensuing clash, the Ottoman rear-guard was completely annihilated by the cavalry charge.

== Aftermath ==
The capture of the town brought an immediate end to the wider operations surrounding the Battle of Köprüköy. Ottoman losses during the final engagement at Hasankale were severe, totaling 1,000 men sabred (killed in action), 1,500 taken prisoner, and 4 artillery pieces captured by the Russians. Surviving elements of the Ottoman 17th Division retreated toward Erzurum in severe disorder.

Following the rout, the Siberian Cossacks continued their pursuit further west to Kuruca on the very same day. From this new vantage point, a Russian horsed artillery battery fired the first shells of the campaign against the outer defenses of Erzurum located on the slopes of the Deve-Boyun Ridge.
