= Capture of Trabzon (1918) =

WWI Ottoman victory in the Caucasus

Trabzon campaign (1918)
- Part of Caucasus campaign
Date	24–25 February 1918
Location	Trabzon, Turkey
Result	Ottoman victory
Territorial changes	Trabzon recaptured by the Ottomans

Belligerents
Ottoman Empire	(Russian Empire) Russian volunteers Pontic Greeks; Armenian fedayi

Commanders and leaders
(Ottoman Empire) Wehib Pasha	Unknown

Units involved
Third Army (Ottoman Empire)	Unknown

Casualties and losses
(Ottoman Empire) 600 killed (Ottoman Empire) 700 wounded	(Russian Empire) 1,050 casualties 250 casualties

The Capture of Trabzon refers to the military operation carried out by the reorganized Ottoman Third Army, under the command of Wehip Pasha, which resulted in the seizure of Trabzon from Russian control on February 24, 1918, during World War I.

== Seizure ==
In the context of the Ottoman front during World War I, the German government had initially opposed Turkish advances into the Caucasus region. However, due to their growing frustration with the actions of Trotsky, the Germans abandoned their previous objections and agreed in the final version of the Brest-Litovsk Treaty to the clearance of Russian troops from the districts of Ardahan, Kars, and Batum.

Taking advantage of this shift in German policy, the reorganized Ottoman Third Army—which incorporated divisions from the disbanded Second Army—undertook an offensive to capture Trabzon led by their commander, Vehip Pasha.

On February 24, 1918, Trabzon was successfully seized by Ottoman forces but not without bloodshed. Approximately 600 individuals lost their lives, and 700 were wounded, primarily due to an explosion at an ammunitions depot. The circumstances surrounding the explosion remain uncertain, as it is unclear whether it was an accident or an intentional act. Casualties included 1,050 Russians and 250 Greeks, highlighting the diverse ethnic composition of the region.

== Books ==
- McMeekin, Sean (2015-10-13). The Ottoman Endgame: War, Revolution and the Making of the Modern Middle East, 1908-1923. Penguin Books Limited. ISBN 978-0-7181-9972-2.
