= Battle of Karakilisa =

Coordinates: 40.8000°N 44.4833°E

- Part of Caucasus campaign
- Armenian Defense of 1918
Date	May 25–28, 1918
Location	Vanadzor, Armenia
Result	Tactical Ottoman victory: Strategic Armenian victory as Ottoman further invasion halted because of heavy losses

Belligerents
Armenia	Ottoman Empire

Commanders and leaders
Tovmas Nazarbekian; Garegin Nzhdeh	Wehib Pasha; Kazim Pasha

Units involved
1st infantry division 8th infantry regiment	5th division 36th division

Strength
6,000; 70 cannons and 20 Machine guns	10,000; 70 Cannons and 40 Machine Guns

Casualties and losses
1,000 dead and captured	Heavy
- 4,000 Armenian civilians massacred

The Battle of Karakilisa (Armenian: Ղարաքիլիսայի ճակատամարտ Gharakilisayi chakatamart, Turkish: Karakilise Muharebesi or Karakilise Muharebeleri) took place during the Caucasus Campaign of World War I in the vicinity of Karakilisa (now Vanadzor), on May 25–28, 1918.

== Background ==
After Russia's withdrawal from the war, the Armenians fell into a very difficult situation, all the Russian conquests returned back to the Turks, these are cities such as Erzurum, Erzincan, Muş, Bitlis, Trabzon and in May 1918 they captured Alexandroupol where 6,000 Armenians were immediately massacred and killed but the Armenian troops took the tactic of "not a step back" and preferred to die than surrender the land.

== Battle ==
One of the advancing Turkish forces moved towards Yerevan, another one to Karakilisa. The latter forces included about 10,000 soldiers, 80 pieces of artillery and 50 machine-guns. The Armenians were leaving their homes moving to the south to Yerevan and Syunik. Garegin Nzhdeh (with his troops) reached Karakilisa and managed to unite the population for the fight. The Armenian forces reached the number of 6,000. After a violent battle of 4 days, on May 25–28, both sides had serious losses. Although the Ottoman army managed to occupy Karakilisa and massacre all its population of 4,000 people, it had no more forces to intrude farther into Armenian territories.

== Aftermath ==
Despite the victory, the Turks experienced difficulties, their troops were drained of blood by the fierce resistance of the Armenians, as well as the scorched earth tactics in Georgia. The Turks reported to the headquarters:

We do not have the strength to defeat the Armenians. The three-day battle in Karakilise shows that as long as their existence is in danger they will prefer to die fighting. We must not bring on a battle with the force that 1,200,000 Armenians can raise. If the Georgians join in the hostilities, it will be impossible to advance... In short, we must come to terms with the Armenians and Georgians.

— Wehib Pasha
