= Trebizond Campaign =

WWI battle

- Part of Caucasus campaign
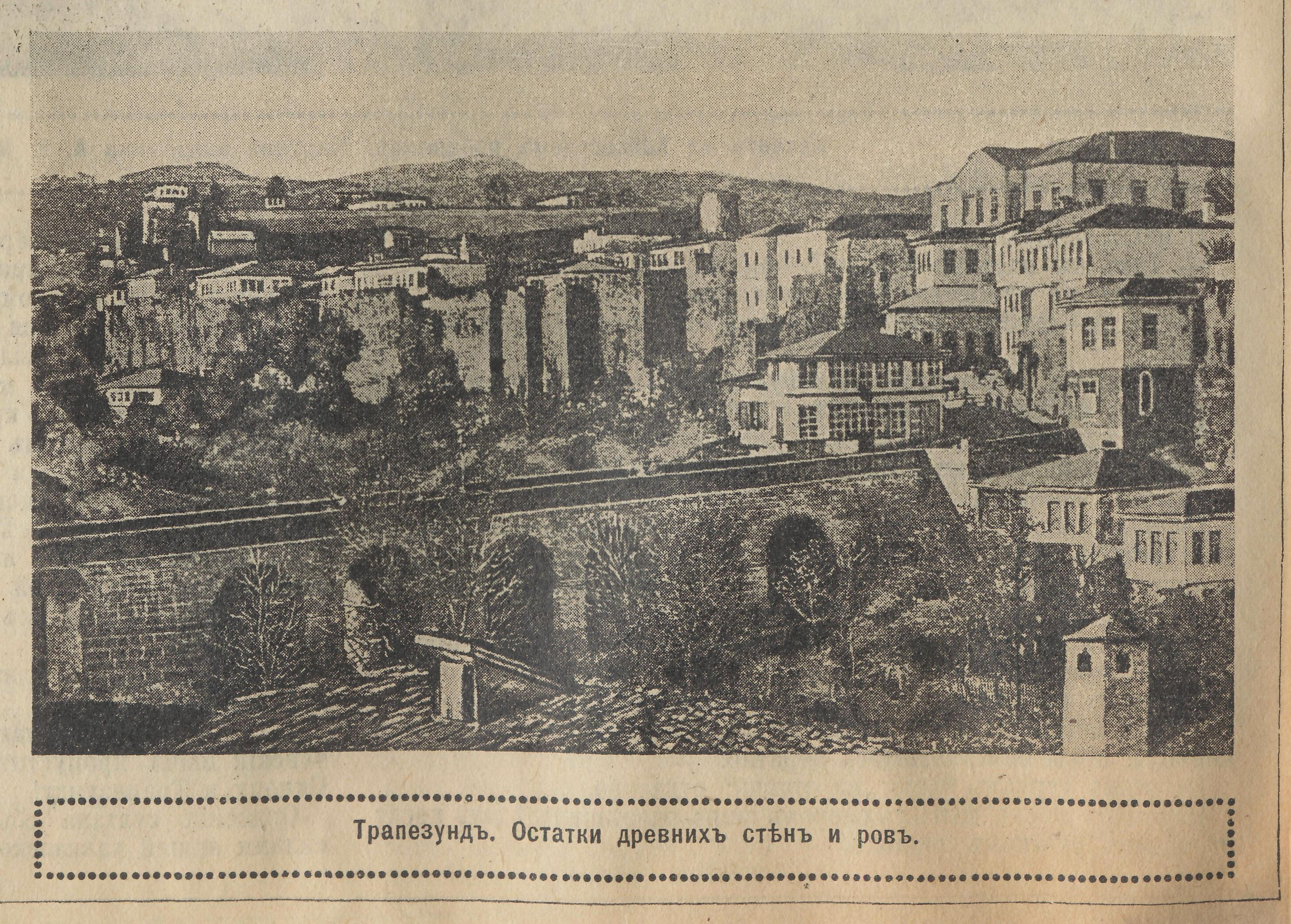
- The city captured by the Russians
Date	February 5 – April 15, 1916
Location	Trabzon, Ottoman Empire
Result	Russian victory
Territorial changes	Russians take control of a large area of the Black Sea coast, including Trabzon and Rize Province

Belligerents
(Russia) Russian Empire	Ottoman Empire

Commanders and leaders
(Russia) Nikolai Yudenich	(Ottoman Empire) Vehip Pasha

Strength
Russian Caucasus Army	Third Army

Casualties and losses
Unknown	Unknown

The Trebizond Campaign, also known as the Battle of Trebizond, was a series of successful Russian naval and land operations that resulted in the capture of Trabzon. It was the logical step after the Erzerum Campaign. Operations began on February 5 and concluded when the Ottoman troops abandoned Trabzon on the night of April 15, 1916.

== Lazistan offensive ==
=== Timeline ===
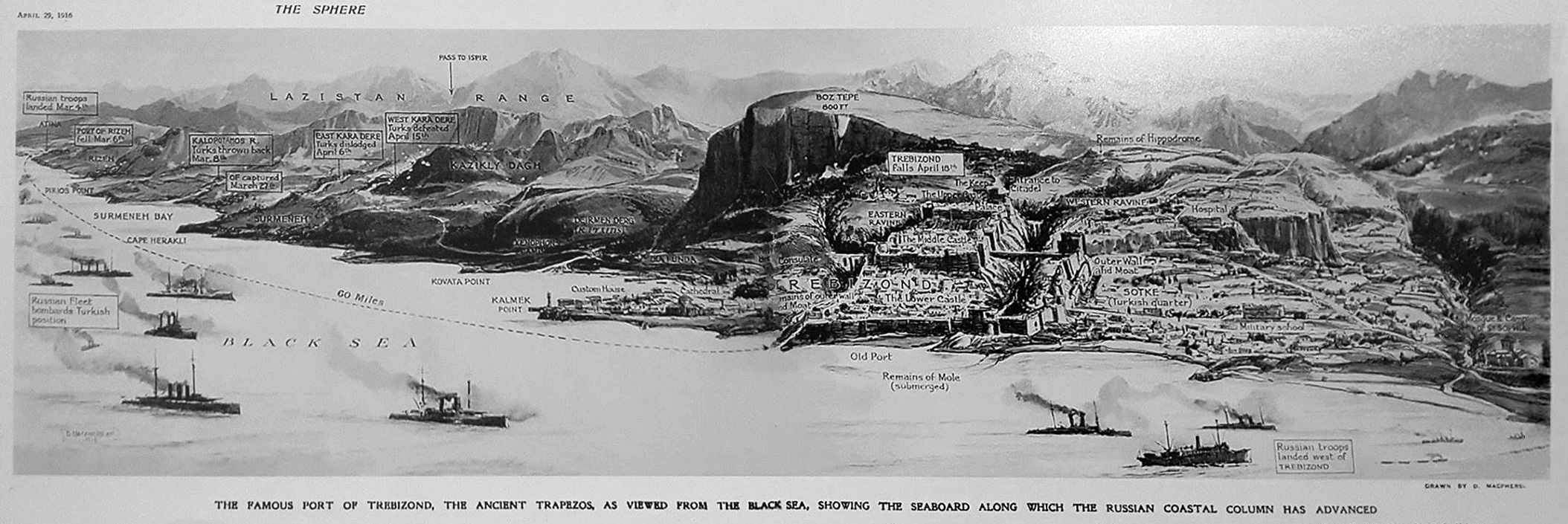
Illustration of the capture of Trabzon by the Russian army. Published by The Sphere on April 29, 1916.

- 1916
  - 2nd half of January; Russians occupied the territory between the Çoruh River and the Russian frontier. Makriali was taken.
  - January 17–20; Russian destroyers crushed a large number of Turkish sailing craft along Lazistan coast that were supplying Turkish army.
  - February; Turkistanski Regiments occupied Hopa.
  - February 5; Russian squadron heavily damaged Turkish trenches beyond the Arhavi river.
  - February 6: Turks abandoned their lines, leaving 500 dead behind.
  - February 15–16: The same sequence of events was repeated at Vitze. Turks retrenched behind the Buyuk-dere river. Several Turkish battalions reinforced Rize from Trebizond. General Lyakhov in conference with naval officers accepted proposal to land infantry (2 battalions with 2 mountain guns) in the rear of the Turkish position.
  - March 4–5; Rostislav and the gunboats Kubanetz and Donetz supported the amphibious landing at Atina. Turks on the Buyuk-dere position fled into the mountains.
  - March 6–7; the landing operation was repeated at Mapavri and met with only slight resistance.
  - March 8; Russians occupied Rize and pushed their patrols forward to the river Kalapotamos to the east of the small town of Of. Here the advance of the Black Sea coast detachment was temporarily halted.

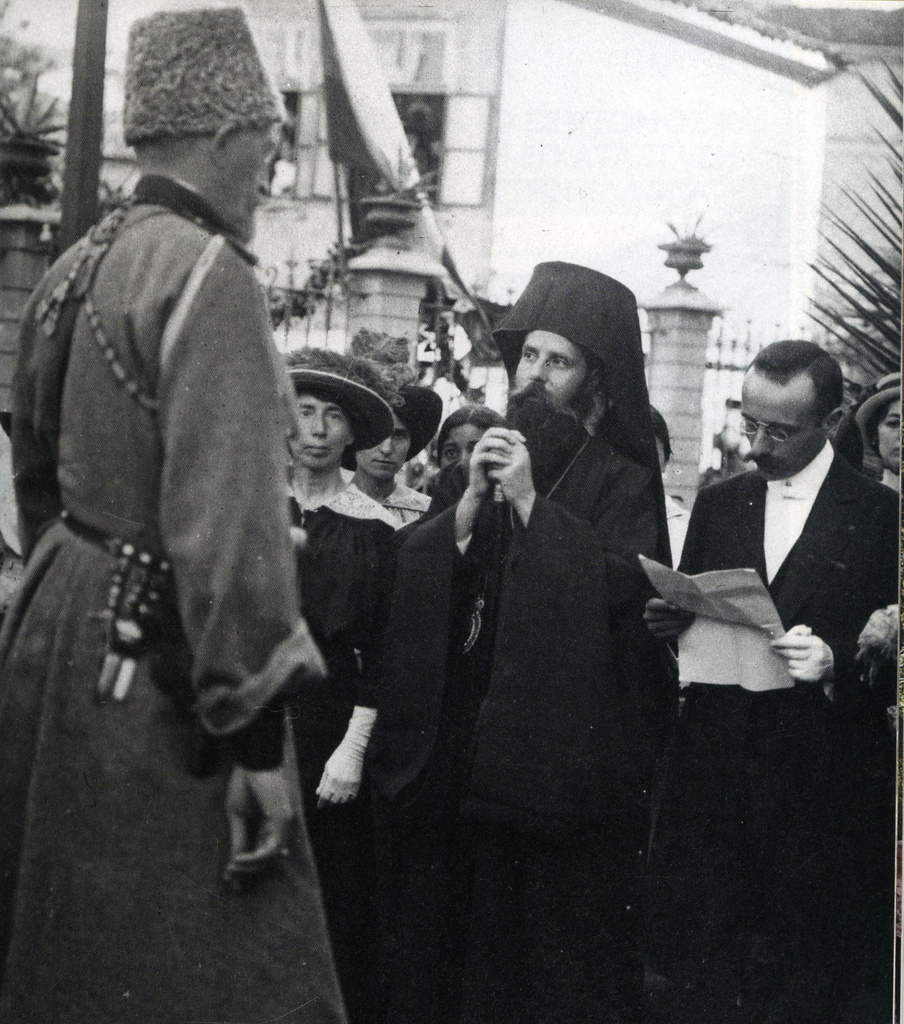
Trabzon Mayor Ioannis Triftanidis & Greek Orthodox metropolitan Chrysanthos welcoming Grand Duke Nikolai Nikolayevich who entered the city with the Russian Caucasus Army (April 1916).

== Effect on Armenians ==
Prior to World War I, the vibrant Armenian community of Trabzon numbered 30,000. In 1915, during the Armenian genocide, they were massacred and deported. After the Russian capture of Trabzon, some 500 surviving Armenians were able to return, as well as Armenian monks of the Kaymakli Monastery.
