= Battle of Erzincan (1916) =

1916 battle of World War I

Battle of Erzincan Эрзинджанское сражение Երզնկայի ճակատամարտ Erzincan Muharebesi
- Part of Caucasus campaign
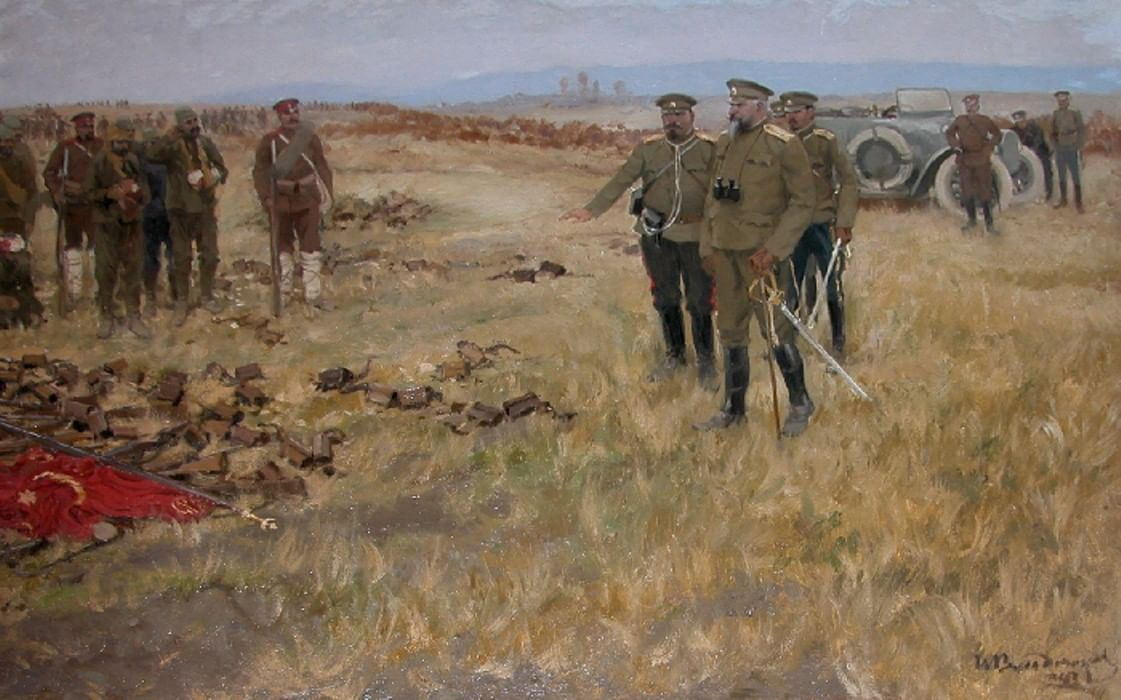
- Surrender of Turkish soldiers
Date	2–25 July 1916
Location	Erzincan, Erzurum Vilayet, Ottoman Empire
Result	Russian victory
Territorial changes	Russians successfully capture Erzincan from the Ottomans

Belligerents
Russian Empire	Ottoman Empire

Commanders and leaders
Nikolai Yudenich	Hasan Izzet Pasha; Topal Osman; Wehib Pasha

Units involved
Russian Caucasus Army; Greek Caucasus Division	Third Army

Casualties and losses
12,000	34,000, of them 17,000 captured

The Battle of Erzincan (Russian: Эрзинджанское сражение, Turkish: Erzincan Muharebesi) was a Russian victory over the Ottoman Empire during the First World War.

In February 1916, Nikolai Yudenich had taken the cities of Erzurum and Trabzon. Trabzon had provided the Russians with a port to receive reinforcements in the Caucasus. Enver Pasha ordered the Third Army, now under Vehip Pasha, to retake Trabzon. Vehip's attack failed and General Yudenich counterattacked on July 2. The Russian attack hit the Turkish communications center of Erzincan forcing Vehip's troops to retreat as well as losing 34,000 men, half taken as POWs. As a result, the Third Army was rendered ineffective for the rest of the year and Erzincan was captured by the Russians.
