= Nikolai Yudenich =

Russian general (1862–1933)

- Николай Николаевич Юденич
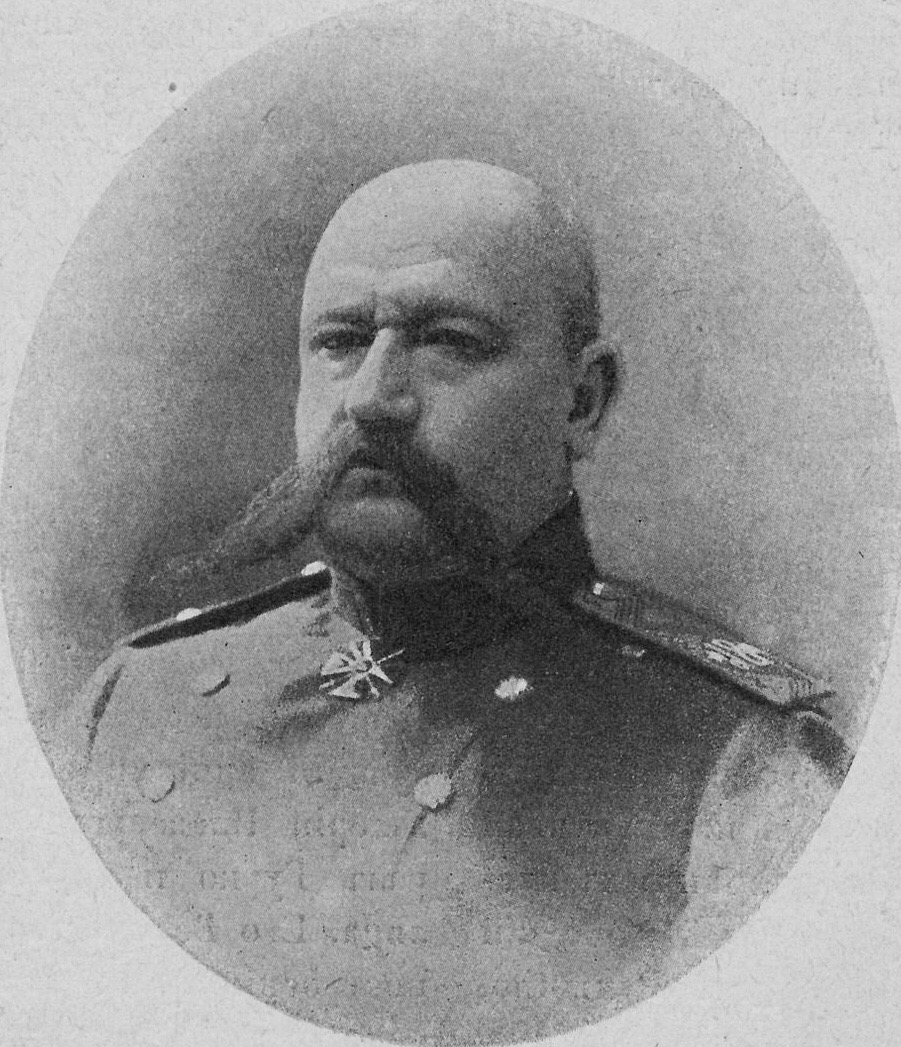
- Yudenich, before 1912.
- Born: 30 July 1862; Moscow, Moskovsky Uyezd, Moscow Governorate, Russian Empire
- Died: 5 October 1933 (aged 71); Saint-Laurent-du-Var, France
- Burial place: Cimetière orthodoxe de Caucade, Nice, France
- Military career
- Allegiance: Russian Empire (1879–1917); Russian Republic (1917); White Movement (1917–1919)
- Branch: (Russian Empire) Imperial Russian Army (Russian Republic) White Army
- Service years: 1879–1919
- Rank: General of the Infantry
- Commands: Russian Caucasus Army
- Conflicts: Russian conquest of Central Asia; Russo-Japanese War; Battle of Sandepu; Persian Constitutional Revolution; World War I; Caucasus Campaign; Köprüköy operation; Battle of Sarikamish; Battle of Manzikert; Battle of Kara Killisse; Battle of Koprukoy; Erzurum offensive; Battle of Trebizond; Battle of Erzincan; Battle of Bitlis; Battle of Muş; Russian Civil War; Estonian War of Independence; Battle of Petrograd
- Awards: See below

Nikolai Nikolayevich Yudenich (Russian: Николай Николаевич Юденич; 30 July [O.S. 18 July] 1862 – 5 October 1933) was a commander of the Russian Imperial Army during World War I. He was a leader of the anti-communist White movement in northwestern Russia during the Civil War.

== Early life ==
Yudenich was born in Moscow, where his father was a minor court official. Yudenich graduated from the Alexandrovsky Military College in 1881 and the General Staff Academy in 1887. He first served with the Life Guards Lithuanian Regiment from November 1889 to December 1890. In January 1892, he was transferred to the Turkestan Military District and was promoted to lieutenant colonel in April 1892. He was a member of the Pamir Expedition in 1894 and was promoted to colonel in 1896. From 20 September 1900, Yudenich served on the staff of the 1st Turkestan Rifle Brigade.

In 1902, Yudenich was appointed commander of the 18th Infantry Regiment, which he continued to command during the Russo-Japanese War of 1904–1905. He was wounded in the arm during the Battle of Sandepu and wounded in the neck during the Battle of Mukden. At the end of the war, he was promoted to major general.

From February 1907, Yudenich served as quartermaster of the General Staff of the Caucasus Military District. He was promoted to lieutenant general in 1912 and served as chief of staff at Kazan, followed by the Caucasus Military District in 1913.

== World War I ==
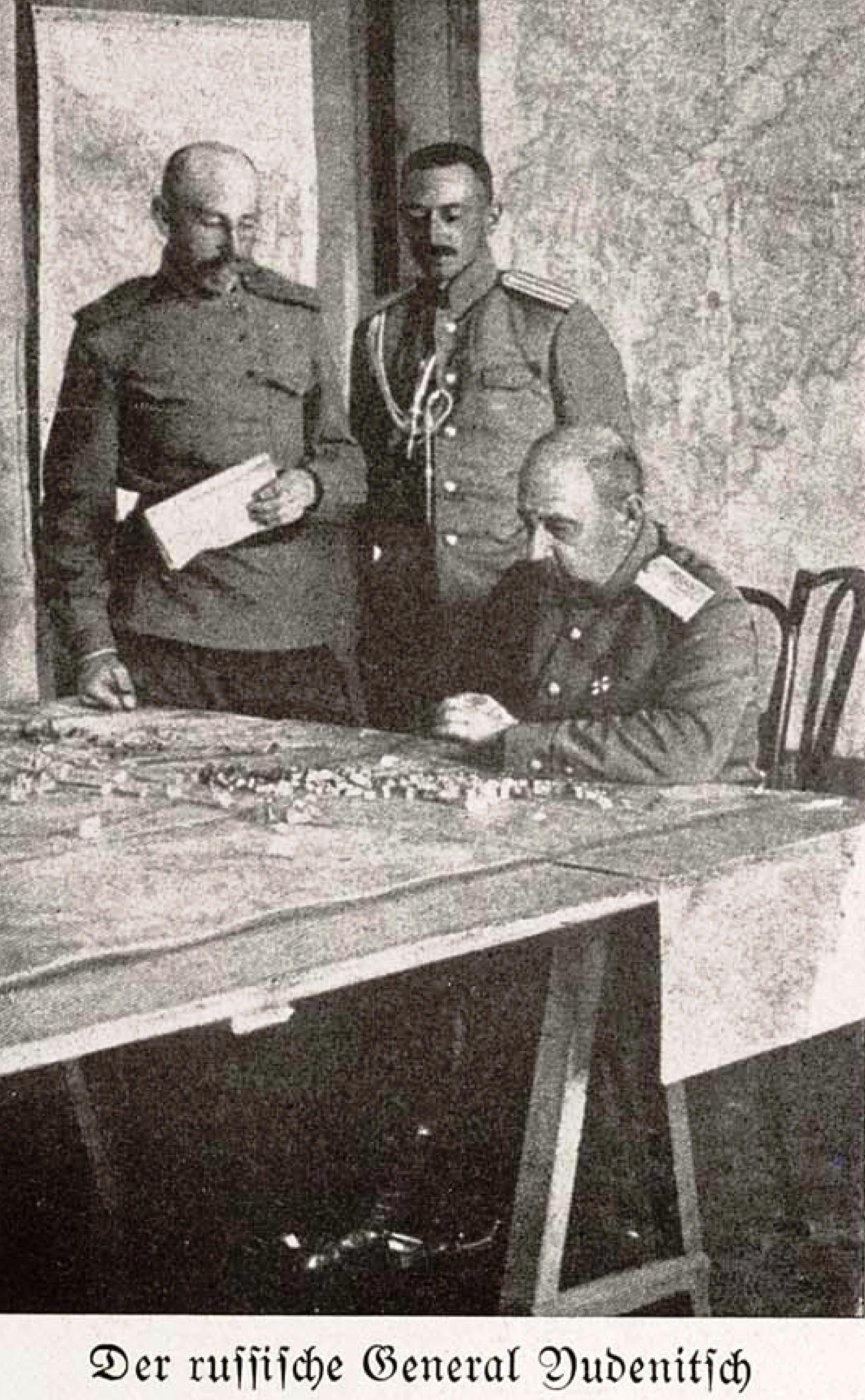
Nikolai Yudenich

At the beginning of World War I, Yudenich was appointed Chief of Staff of the Russian Caucasus Army. Major operations included the Battle of Sarikamish, a victory against Enver Pasha of the Ottoman Empire. In January 1915, Yudenich was promoted to General of Infantry and replaced Count Illarion Ivanovich Vorontsov-Dashkov as commander of the Caucasus Campaign. Yudenich tried to exploit the Ottoman defeat by attacking into Turkish territory, specifically around Lake Van during the Siege of Van. The Russians captured Van in May 1915, but they were forced to withdraw from the city two months later. The Ottoman 3rd Army reoccupied Van in August.

Grand Duke Nicholas, having been removed from command of all of Russia's armies, was then put in charge of the Caucasus. Yudenich was given a free hand by the Grand Duke, and, in September the Russians retook Van and re-established the Administration for Western Armenia in June 1916. Fighting back and forth around the region continued for the next 14 months without a clear victory for either side.

In 1916, Yudenich successfully carried out an offensive, winning the Battle of Erzurum (1916) and the Trebizond Campaign. In the summer of that year, his forces fought off a Turkish counterattack, culminating in the Battle of Erzincan, which included the presence of Ottoman General Mustafa Kemal. During the battle, Yudenich was awarded the Order of St. George (2nd degree), the final time the decoration was awarded in the Russian Empire.

After the February Revolution, Yudenich was appointed commander of the Caucasus Front in 1917, but in May, the Russian Provisional Government removed him from command for insubordination. On direct orders from Alexander Kerensky, he retired from the army. Yudenich then relocated from Tbilisi to Petrograd, where he supported the Kornilov revolt.

== White Army ==
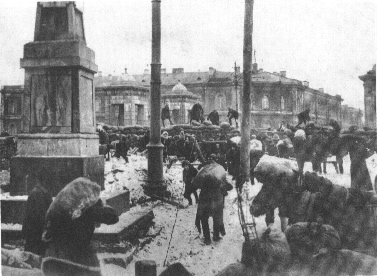
The building of barricades in Petrograd during the offensive of General Yudenich in 1919

After the October Revolution of 1917, Yudenich went into hiding from the Bolsheviks and was sheltered by a former sergeant of the Life Guards of Lithuania, who had served with Yudenich from his time in the Pamirs. He managed to escape to exile in Finland in January 1919. In Helsinki, Yudenich joined the "Russian Committee," which had formed in November 1918 to oppose the Bolsheviks, and he was proclaimed as leader of the White movement in northwestern Russia with absolute powers. In the spring of 1919, Yudenich visited Stockholm, where he met with diplomatic representatives of Britain, France, and the United States and tried with limited success to obtain assistance in developing a Russian volunteer corps to fight the Bolsheviks.

In June 1919, Yudenich made contact with Admiral Aleksandr Kolchak's All-Russian Government based in Omsk, which subsequently acknowledged him as commander-in-chief of all Russian armed forces operating against the Bolsheviks in the Baltic Sea and in northwestern Russia. Kolchak also provided much-needed funds to pay and equip his forces. In June 1919, Yudenich went to Tallinn to meet with General Aleksandr Rodzyanko, the commander of the White Russian Northern Army, attacking Petrograd formally under the Estonian High Command. Yudenich appointed Rodzyanko as his aide.

In August 1919, under pressure from the British government, ad hoc to issue a legally-binding guarantee of the independence of his key ally Estonia, Yudenich was forced to create the counterrevolutionary "Regional Government of Northwest Russia," which included monarchists, Socialist-Revolutionaries, and Mensheviks. Yudenich served as Minister of War and spent the next two months organizing and training his army. By September 1919, he had a fairly well-organized army of approximately 17,000 troops, with 53 guns and six tanks. The six tanks were supplied by Britain, together with their volunteer crews, who were the only British ground troops to fight alongside the Northwestern Army.

In early October 1919, Yudenich launched his army against Petrograd, which was only lightly defended, as the Red Army was actively engaged on several other fronts in fighting Kolchak's forces in Siberia and several Cossack armies in Ukraine. Yudenich's friend from the Imperial Russian Army, General Carl Gustav Emil Mannerheim, asked Finnish President Kaarlo Juho Ståhlberg to join Yudenich's force and to attack Petrograd with help from the Finnish White Guards. Yudenich would have recognized Finland's independence, and the country's pro-Triple Entente relationships would be recognized. As Kolchak, nominally the leader of the White Armies, would not recognize Finland's independence, Stålhberg denied Mannerheim's request. Overall, the Northwestern Army was nationalistic and patriotic and thus rejected ethnic particularism and separatism. The Northwestern Army generally believed in a united multinational Russia and opposed separatists wanting to create nation-states.

On 12 October 1919, the Whites retook Yamburg (now Kingisepp). Two days later, Yudenich was approaching Gatchina. On 19 October 1919 his troops reached the outskirts of Petrograd, but his forces failed to secure the vital Moscow – Saint Petersburg Railway, which allowed the Revolutionary Military Council to send in massive reinforcements to prevent the fall of the city. Yudenich's stalled offensive collapsed in late October, and the 7th and the 15th Red Armies repulsed the White Russian troops back into Estonia in November. Distrustful of the White Russians, the Estonian High Command disarmed and interned the remains of Northwestern Army, which retreated behind Estonian lines. Politically, the Bolsheviks secured a separate armistice with Estonia on 3 January by promising to recognize Estonian independence, an offer contrary to the White Army's and the Kolchak government's position.

During the civil war, like many other generals, Yudenich issued currency to pay his troops. They were reported to be so worthless that a Tallinn chocolate company requested permission to use the banknotes as wrappers for its products.

On 28 January 1920, General Stanisław Bułak-Bałachowicz, together with several Russian officers and the Estonian Police, arrested Yudenich as he tried to escape to Western Europe. Yudenich was later released from prison.

== Later life ==
After his release, Yudenich departed for exile in France. During his remaining 13 years, he played no significant role among White émigré community there.

Yudenich died at Saint-Laurent-du-Var, near Nice, on the French Riviera, on 5 October 1933.

== Honors ==
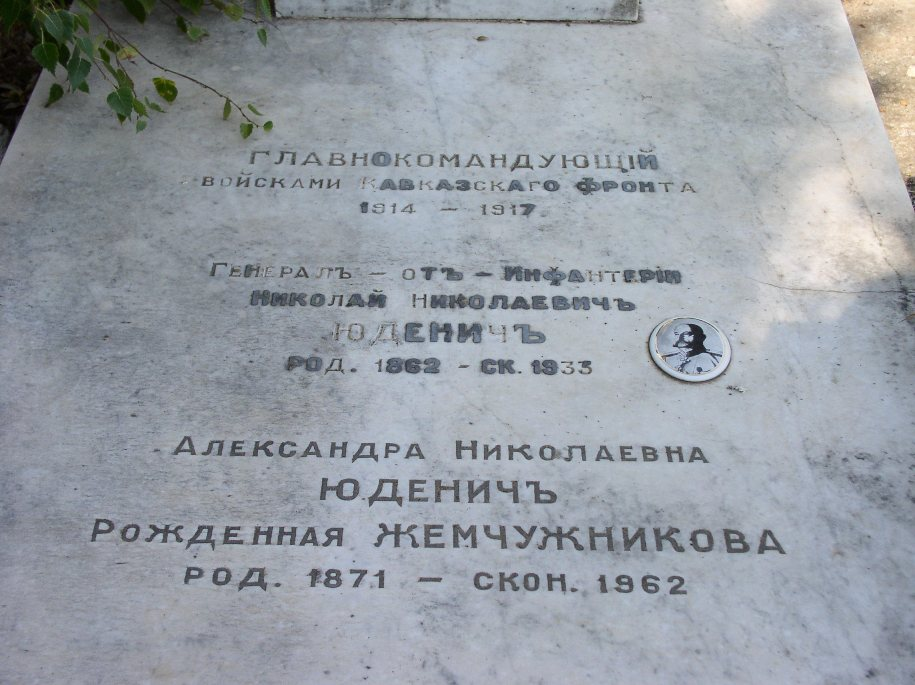
Nikolai Yudenich grave

- Order of St. Stanislaus 3rd degree, 1889
- Order of St. Anne 3rd degree 1893
- Order of St. Stanislaus 2nd degree 1895
- Order of St. Anne 2nd degree 1900
- Order of St Vladimir, 4th degree, 1904
- Order of St Vladimir, 3rd degree with swords, 1906
- Order of St. Stanislaus 1st degree with swords, 1906
- Gold Sword for Bravery, 1906
- Order of St. Anne 1st degree 1909
- Order of St Vladimir, 2nd degree with swords, 1913
- Order of St. George, 4th class, 1916
- Order of St. George, 3rd class, 1916
- Order of St. George, 2nd class, 2 February 1916

== Sources ==
- Biography of Yudenich at First World War.com
