= Caucasus campaign =

Theatre of World War I

- Part of the Middle Eastern theatre of World War I, the Southern Front of the Russian Civil War, and the Russo-Turkish wars
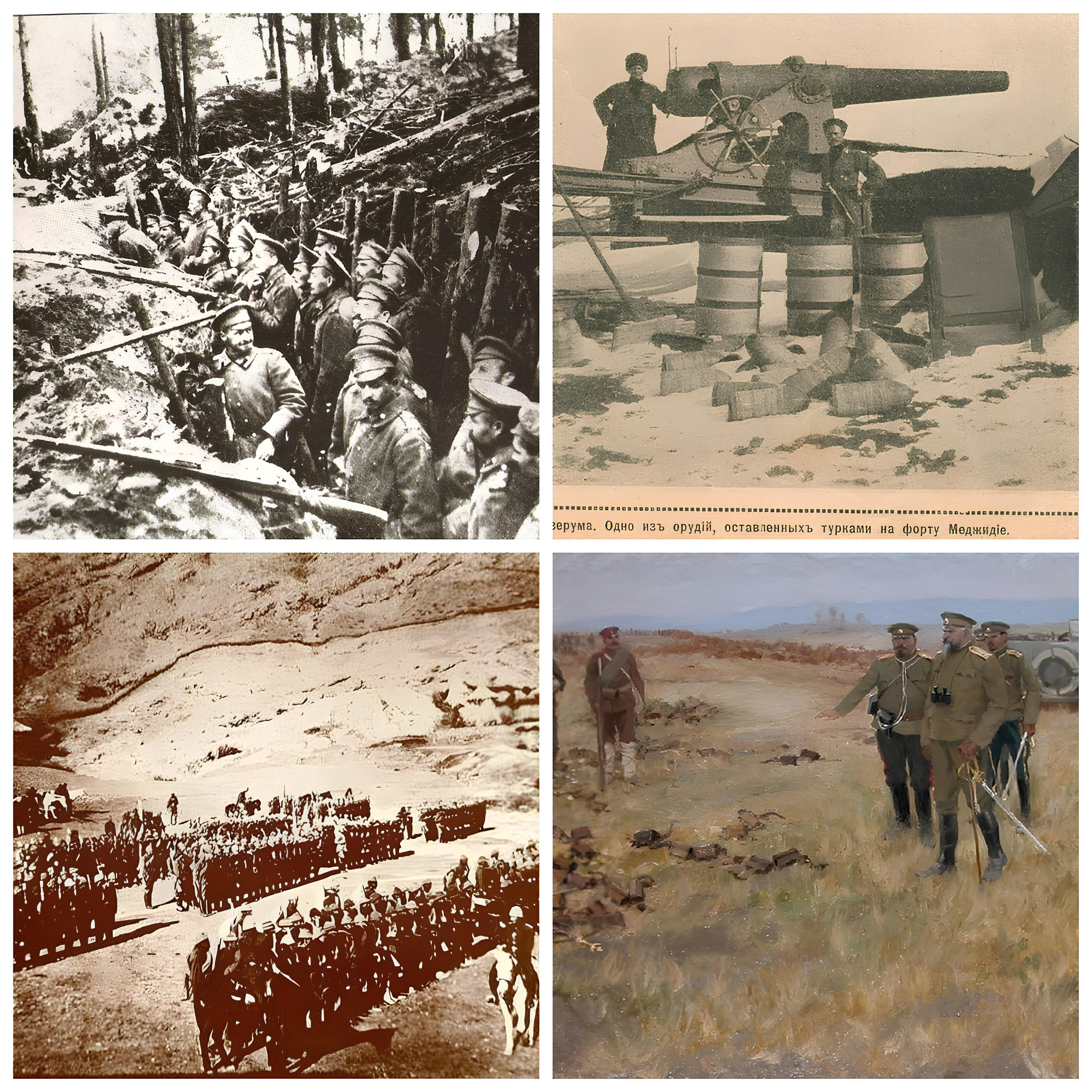
- Clockwise, from top left: The Battle of Sarikamish, The Erzurum Offensive, The Battle of Bitlis, The Battle of Erzincan
Date	October 29, 1914 – October 30, 1918 (4 years and 1 day)
Location	Armenian Highlands, South Caucasus
Result	See § Aftermath
Territorial changes	Independence of Armenia, Azerbaijan, and Georgia

Belligerents
Allied Powers: 1914–1917: Russian Empire; 1917: Russian Provisional Government (Russia) Russian Republic; Russian SFSR; 1917–1918: Transcaucasian DFR; 1918: Armenia; British Empire; Centrocaspian Dictatorship; Baku Commune	Central Powers: Ottoman Empire; 1918: Northern Caucasus (Azerbaijan Democratic Republic) Azerbaijan; Republic of Aras 1918: German Empire (Democratic Republic of Georgia) Georgia

Commanders and leaders
Nicholas II; I. Vorontsov-Dashkov; Grand Duke Nicholas; Nikolai Yudenich (Russian Soviet Federative Socialist Republic) Sergei Kirov; Stepan Shaumian; Andranik Ozanian (Note: Andranik condemned and refuse to fight for the First Republic of Armenia.) (First Republic of Armenia) Tovmas Nazarbekian (First Republic of Armenia) Drastamat Kanayan; Agha Petros (United Kingdom of Great Britain and Ireland) Lionel Dunsterville	(Ottoman Empire) Enver Pasha (Ottoman Empire) Wehib Pasha (Ottoman Empire) Abdul Kerim Pasha (Ottoman Empire) Ahmed İzzet Pasha (Ottoman Empire) Mustafa Kemal Pasha (Ottoman Empire) Nuri Pasha (Ottoman Empire) Faik Pasha † (Azerbaijan Democratic Republic) Ali-Agha Shikhlinski (German Empire) F. K. von Kressenstein (Democratic Republic of Georgia) Giorgi Kvinitadze

Units involved
Caucasus Army (Note: Subsequently reorganised as the Caucasus Front.) (First Republic of Armenia) Armenian Army; Assyrian volunteers (United Kingdom of Great Britain and Ireland) British Armoured Car Expeditionary Force (United Kingdom of Great Britain and Ireland) Dunsterforce	(Ottoman Empire) 3rd Army (Ottoman Empire) 2nd Army (Ottoman Empire) (Azerbaijan Democratic Republic) Islamic Army of the Caucasus (Circassia) Circassian volunteers (Kurdistan Region) Kurdish Tribesmen (German Empire) Caucasus Expedition

Strength
: 1914: 100,000–160,000; 1916: 250,000–702,000 : Early 1918: 25,000–30,000 Total: 350,000–1,000,000	(Ottoman Empire) : December 1914: 150,000–190,000 men 1916: 445 battalions, 159 squadrons and 12,000 Kurds; Early 1918: 100,000 (German Empire) : 1918: 3,000

Casualties and losses
119,000 total or 100,000 (during 1916–1917 winter) (United Kingdom of Great Britain and Ireland) 200+	(Ottoman Empire) 300,000–350,000 (Note: Other estimate: 239,733 casualties (without sick))
- 600,000–1,500,000 Armenian civilians dead 300,000 Greek civilians dead 600,000 Muslim civilians dead

The Caucasus campaign, also known as the Caucasus Front, comprised armed conflicts between the Russian Empire and the Ottoman Empire, later including Armenia, Azerbaijan, Georgia, the Mountainous Republic of the Northern Caucasus, the German Empire, the Central Caspian Dictatorship, and the British Empire, as part of the Middle Eastern theatre during World War I. The Caucasus campaign extended from the South Caucasus to the Armenian Highlands region, reaching as far as Trabzon, Bitlis, Mush and Van. The land warfare was accompanied by naval engagements in the Black Sea.

The Russian military campaign started on 1 November 1914 with the Russian invasion of Turkish Armenia. In February 1917, the Russian advance was halted following the Russian Revolution. The Russian Caucasus Army soon disintegrated and was replaced by the forces of the newly established Transcaucasian state, comprising partly of Armenian volunteer units and irregular units which had previously been part of the Russian Army. During 1918 the region also saw the establishment of the Central Caspian Dictatorship, the Republic of Mountainous Armenia and an Allied intervention force, nicknamed Dunsterforce, composed of troops drawn from the Mesopotamian and Western Fronts.

On March 3, 1918, the campaign had terminated between the Ottoman Empire and Russia with the Treaty of Brest-Litovsk, and on June 4, 1918, the Ottomans signed the Treaty of Batum with Armenia, Azerbaijan, and Georgia gaining independence. However, conflict continued as the Ottoman Empire was still engaged with the Central Caspian Dictatorship, the Republic of Mountainous Armenia, and the Dunsterforce of the British Empire until the Armistice of Mudros was signed on October 30, 1918.

The Turkish genocide of the Armenians began in April 1915 when 250 Armenians were arrested. The official reason was that the Armenians were in league with the Russians and could serve as a potential fifth column. The genocide continued until 1918.

== Background ==
The main objective of the Ottoman Empire was the recovery of territory in the Caucasus, including regions captured by the Russian Empire as a result of the Russo-Turkish War of 1877-78. The strategic goals of the Caucasus campaign for Ottoman forces was to retake Artvin, Ardahan, Kars, and the port of Batum. A success in this region would mean a diversion of Russian forces to this front from the Polish and Galician fronts. A Caucasus campaign would have a distracting effect on Russian forces. The plan found sympathy with Germany. Germany supplied the missing resources and the Ottoman 3rd Army's manpower was used to achieve the desired distraction. War Minister Enver Pasha hoped a success would facilitate opening the route to Tiflis and beyond with a revolt of Caucasian Muslims. The Ottoman strategic goal was to cut Russian access to the hydrocarbon resources around the Caspian Sea.

Russia viewed the Caucasus front as secondary to the Eastern (European) front. The Eastern Front had the most Russian manpower and resources. Russia had taken the city of Kars from the Turks in 1877 and feared an Ottoman advance into the Caucasus aimed at retaking Kars and the port of Batum. In March 1915, the Russian foreign minister Sergey Sazonov stated in a meeting with British ambassador George Buchanan and French ambassador Maurice Paléologue that a lasting postwar settlement demanded full Russian possession of Constantinople (the capital city of the Ottoman Empire), the straits of Bosphorus and Dardanelles, the Sea of Marmara, southern Thrace up to the Enos-Midia line as well as parts of the Black Sea coast of Anatolia between the Bosphorus, the Sakarya River and an undetermined point near the Bay of Izmit. The Russian Tsarist regime planned to replace the Muslim population of Northern Anatolia and Istanbul with more reliable Cossack settlers.

The British worked with Russian revolutionary troops to prevent Enver Pasha's goal of establishing an independent Transcaucasia. The Anglo-Persian Oil Company was in the proposed path of Ottoman ambitions, and owned the exclusive rights to work petroleum deposits throughout the Persian Empire except in the provinces of Azerbaijan, Ghilan, Mazendaran, Asdrabad and Khorasan. In 1914, before the war, the British government had contracted with the company for the supply of oil-fuel for the navy.

== Forces ==
=== Ottoman Empire ===
The Ottomans had one army based in the region, the 3rd Army. In 1916, they sent reinforcements and formed the 2nd Army. At the beginning of the conflict, the combined forces of the Ottomans ranged from 100,000 to 190,000 men. At the beginning of 1916, the Turks sent huge reinforcements to the Caucasus consisting of troops who had previously won the Gallipoli campaign, their total number was 445 battalions, 159 squadrons, as well as about 12,000 Kurds. Many were poorly equipped.

=== Russia ===
Before the war, Russia had the Russian Caucasus Army stationed here, with 100,000 men under the nominal command of the governor-general of the Caucasus Illarion Vorontsov-Dashkov. The real commander was his chief of staff General Nikolai Yudenich. At the onset of the Caucasus campaign, the Russians had to redeploy almost half of their forces to the Prussian front due to the defeats at the Battle of Tannenberg and the Masurian Lakes, leaving behind just 60,000 troops. However, this army had much greater Armenian support with the Armenian generals Nazarbekov, Silikian, and Pirumov who stayed in Caucasia. The Russian Caucasus Army dissipated in 1917 as the regular Russian regiments deserted the front line after the Russian Revolution. By 1917, when the Russian Caucasus Army disintegrated, there were 110,000–120,000 soldiers of Armenian ethnicity. This number approached 150,000 for the total Armenians (including other Allied forces) in the Near East where they opposed the Ottoman forces.

=== Armenia ===
In the summer of 1914, Armenian volunteer units were established under the Russian armed forces. It was initially established as detachment units (rather than part of Russian Caucasus Command) under the Viceroyalty of the Caucasus. These forces were commanded by Andranik Ozanian. Other leaders included Drastamat Kanayan, Hamazasp Srvandztyan, Arshak Gafavian, and Sargis Mehrabyan. An Ottoman representative Karekin Bastermadjian (Armen Karo) was also united to this force. Initially, they had 20,000 men, but throughout the conflicts, it was reported that their number increased. At the turn of 1916, Nikolai Yudenich decided to either merge these units under the Russian Caucasus Army or dismantle them.

The Armenian national liberation movement commanded the Armenian Fedayee (Armenian: Ֆէտայի Fētayi) during these conflicts. These civilian forces generally organized around famous leaders, such as Murad of Sebastia (Armenian: Սեբաստացի Մուրատ Sebastats'i Murat). These were generally referred to as Armenian partisan guerrilla detachments. Boghos Nubar, the president of the Armenian National Assembly, declared at the Paris Peace Conference of 1919 that they accompanied the main Armenian units. The Russian defensive line from Van to Erzincan was organized through these units.

In December 1917, the Dashnaks of the Armenian national liberation movement through the Armenian National Congress established a military force. The corps realigned themselves under the command of General Tovmas Nazarbekian. Drastamat Kanayan was assigned as a civilian commissioner. The frontline had three main divisions: Movses Silikyan, Andranik Ozanian and Mikhail Areshian. Another regular unit was under Colonel Korganian. The line from Van to Erzincan was also organized through these units. It was mentioned that Adrianic had 150,000 men. After the declaration of the First Republic of Armenia Nazarbekian became the first Commander-in-chief of the whole Armenian state.

By the beginning of 1918, the Armenian National Army (made up of 17,000 former troops of the Russian army augmented by 4,000 local volunteers) numbered some 20,000 infantry and 1,000 cavalry, and according to Allen and Muratoff, on 1 January 1918, the Armenian Corps had:

- 2 infantry divisions:
  - 4 regiments (3 battalions in a regiment)
- 3 infantry brigades:
  - 4 battalions in a brigade
- one cavalry brigade:
  - 2 regiments:
    - 4 squadrons in a regiment
- some militia battalions
- 6 artillery batteries:
  - 4 guns in a battery

(N.B. the battalions fluctuated in strength from 400 to 600 men.)

Contrary to initial Turkish opinion, the Armenian force was actually rather well-equipped and trained. The infantry were made up of veteran soldiers of the Druzhiny units which had fought alongside the Russians for almost four years, and they were allowed to—and did—recover the best of the equipment left behind by the decaying Russian Army. Alternative estimates given by the Ottoman Army state that the Armenian army numbered 50,000 men by the beginning of 1918, while post-war Russian sources put Armenia's strength as two veteran rifle divisions, three brigades of volunteers, and one brigade of cavalry.

=== Japan ===
Japan provided support to Russia on the Caucasus Front, although direct participation of Japanese troops in combat operations was limited. As early as November–December 1914, Japan began supplying Russia with a large number of domestically produced rifles (6.5 mm caliber). Some of these weapons were sent to the Caucasian Army. In total, about 300,000 Japanese rifles were supplied to the Caucasus and Northern fronts.

Several Japanese officers were sent to the Caucasus Front:

- In July 1916, artillery captain Tokinori Tsurumatsu became the first foreign officer to receive permission to be with the Caucasian Army.
- Japanese Prince Kan'in-no-miya Kotohito sent General Zenziro Ishizaka to Tiflis to present the Order of the Chrysanthemum to the Commander-in-Chief of the Caucasus Front, Nicholas Nikolaevich.
- Hirata Tomoo, the Japanese consul in Moscow, was sent to the Caucasus Front in the summer of 1917. After the revolution, he remained at the front to participate in the intervention.
- Japanese military observers, Captains Takeda and Obata, operated on the front in the winter of 1916–1917.

In November 1916, at the request of the Russian Naval Department, 12 Japanese divers and technicians led by Captain Tanaka Kotaro were sent to Sevastopol to participate in raising the dreadnought "Empress Maria".

Japanese volunteers also fought in the ranks of the Russian army on the Caucasus Front. Two soldiers are known to have died in battle in January 1916, while another 9 Japanese continued to fight as part of the Caucasian Army. The press raised the question of possibly dispatching Japanese troops to the Caucasus Front, but the government did not pursue this option.

=== Others ===
Lionel Dunsterville was appointed in 1917 to lead an Allied force of under 1,000 Australian, British, Canadian and New Zealand troops, accompanied by armored cars.

Forces engaged at the campaign

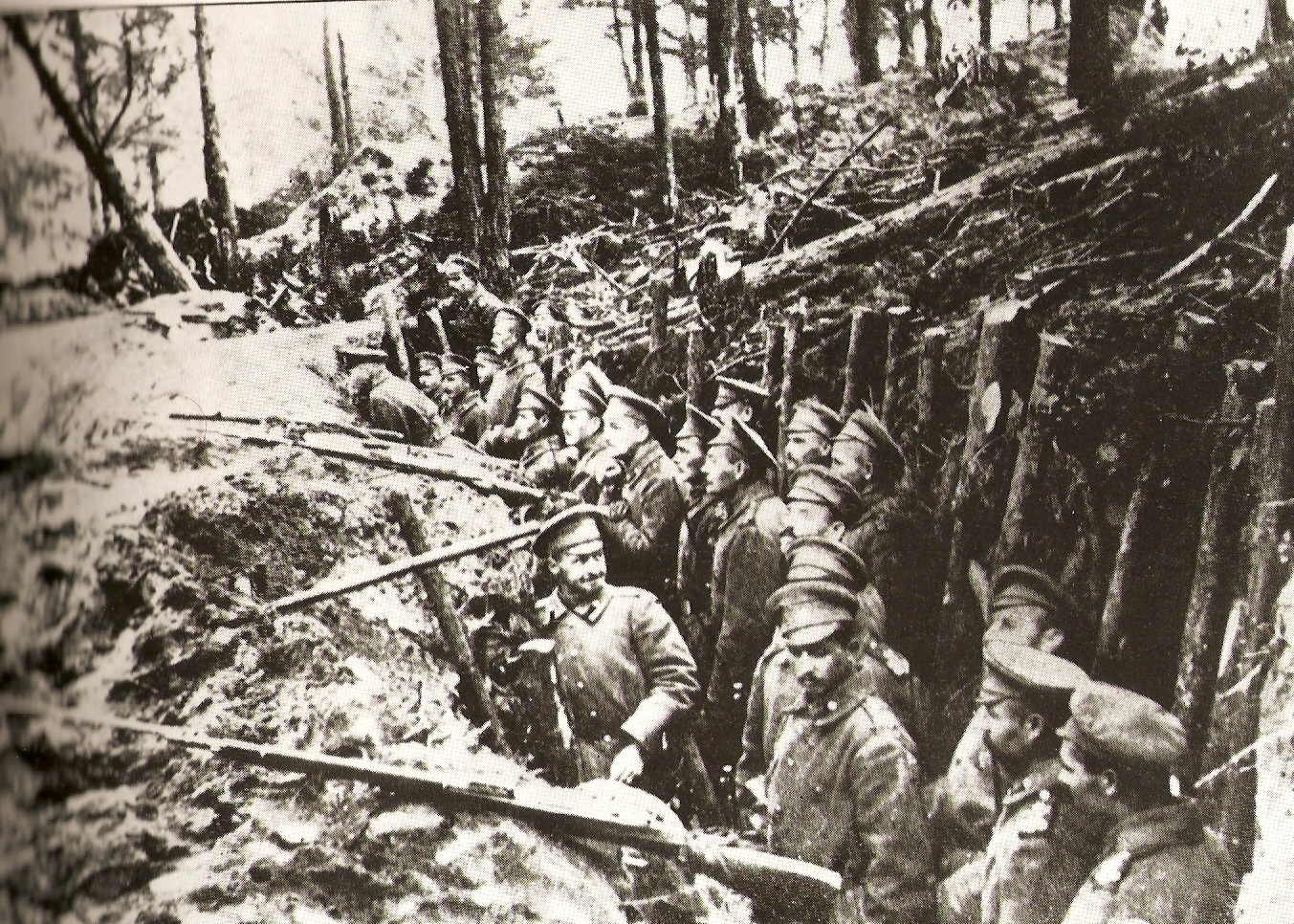
1914, Russian Caucasus Army at Sarikamish

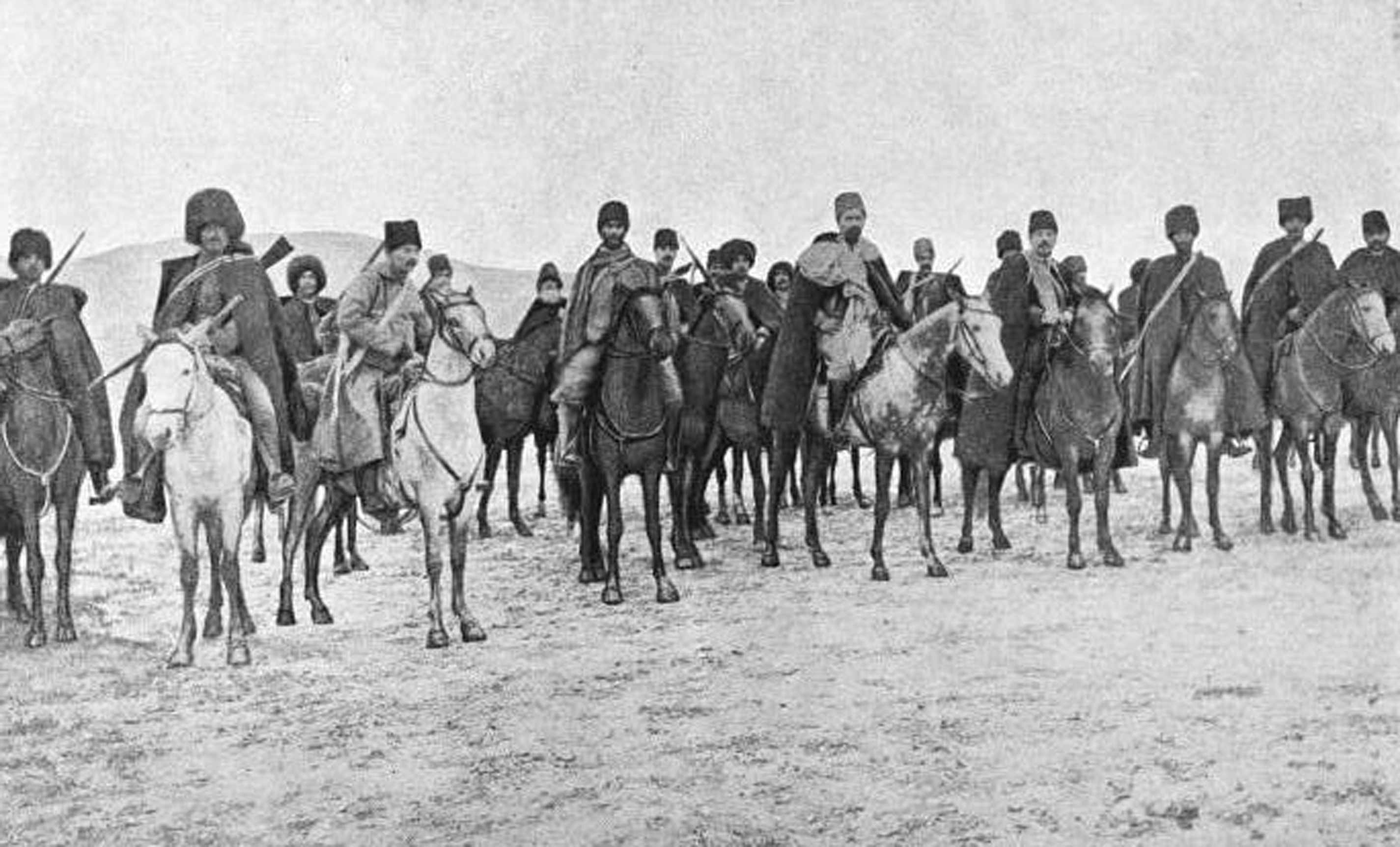
1914, Staff of Armenian volunteers; Khetcho, Dro, and Armen Garo

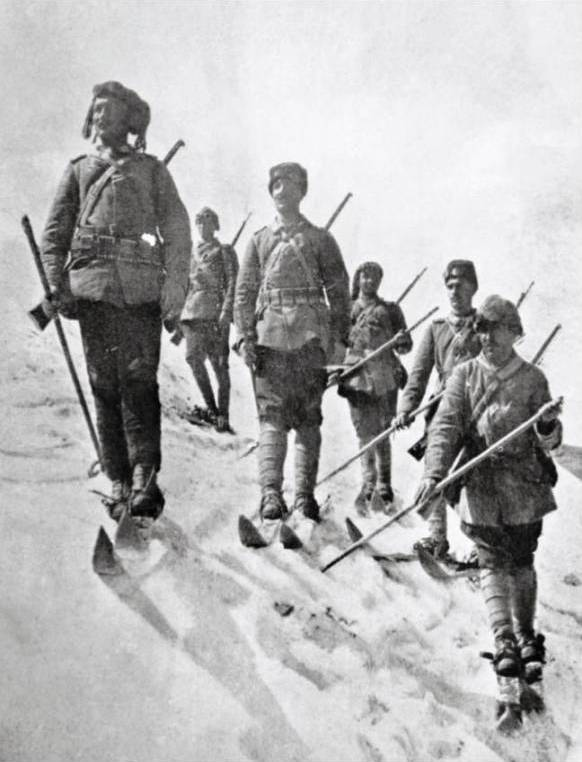
1914, Ottoman 3rd Army with winter gear

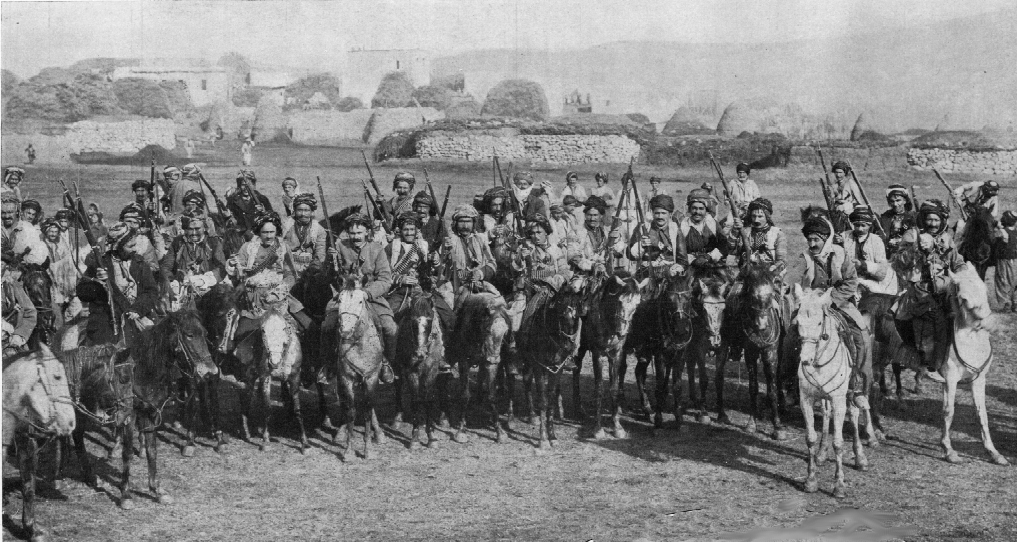
1915, Troops of Kurdish cavalry

== Operations ==
=== 1914 ===
On November 1, in the Bergmann Offensive, Russians crossed the frontier first. They planned to capture Doğubeyazıt and Köprüköy. The official Russian declaration of war on the Ottoman Empire came on November 2. The established force for this goal was 25 infantry battalions, 37 cavalry units and 120 artillery guns. It had two wings. On the right-wing, the Russian I Corps crossed the border and moved from Sarikamish toward the direction of Köprüköy. They reached Köprüköy on November 4. On the left-wing, the Russian IV Corps moved from Yerevan to Pasinler Plains. The commander of 3rd Army, Hasan Izzet was not in favor of an offensive action in the harsh winter conditions. His plan was to remain in defense and launch a counterattack at the right time. This was overridden by the War Minister Enver Pasha. On November 7, the Turkish 3rd Army commenced its offensive with the participation of the XI Corps and all cavalry units. The Russians gained territory after the withdrawal of the 18th and the 30th Divisions. Ottoman forces managed to maintain their positions at Köprüköy. By November 12, the Turkish IX Corps with Ahmet Fevzi Pasha had reinforced the XI Corps on the left flank. The 3rd Army began to push the Russians back with the support of the cavalry. The 3rd Infantry Regiment managed to invade Köprüköy after the Azap Offensive between November 17 and 20. The front had stabilized by the end of November, with the Russians having advanced 25 kilometers into the Ottoman Empire along the Erzurum-Sarikamish axis. There was Russian success along the southern shoulders of the offensive where Armenian volunteers were effective and took Karaköse and Doğubeyazıt. Doğubeyazıt was the northern neighbor of Van Province.

During December, Nicholas II of Russia visited the Caucasus campaign. The head of the Armenian Church, along with the president of the Armenian National Council of Tiflis, Alexander Khatisyan, received him:

From all countries Armenians are hurrying to enter the ranks of the glorious Russian Army, with their blood to serve the victory of the Russian Army... Let the Russian flag wave freely over the Dardanelles and the Bosporus, Let your will the peoples [Armenian] remaining under the Turkish yoke receive freedom. Let the Armenian people of Turkey who have suffered for the faith of Christ receive resurrection for a new free life...

— Nicholas II of Russia

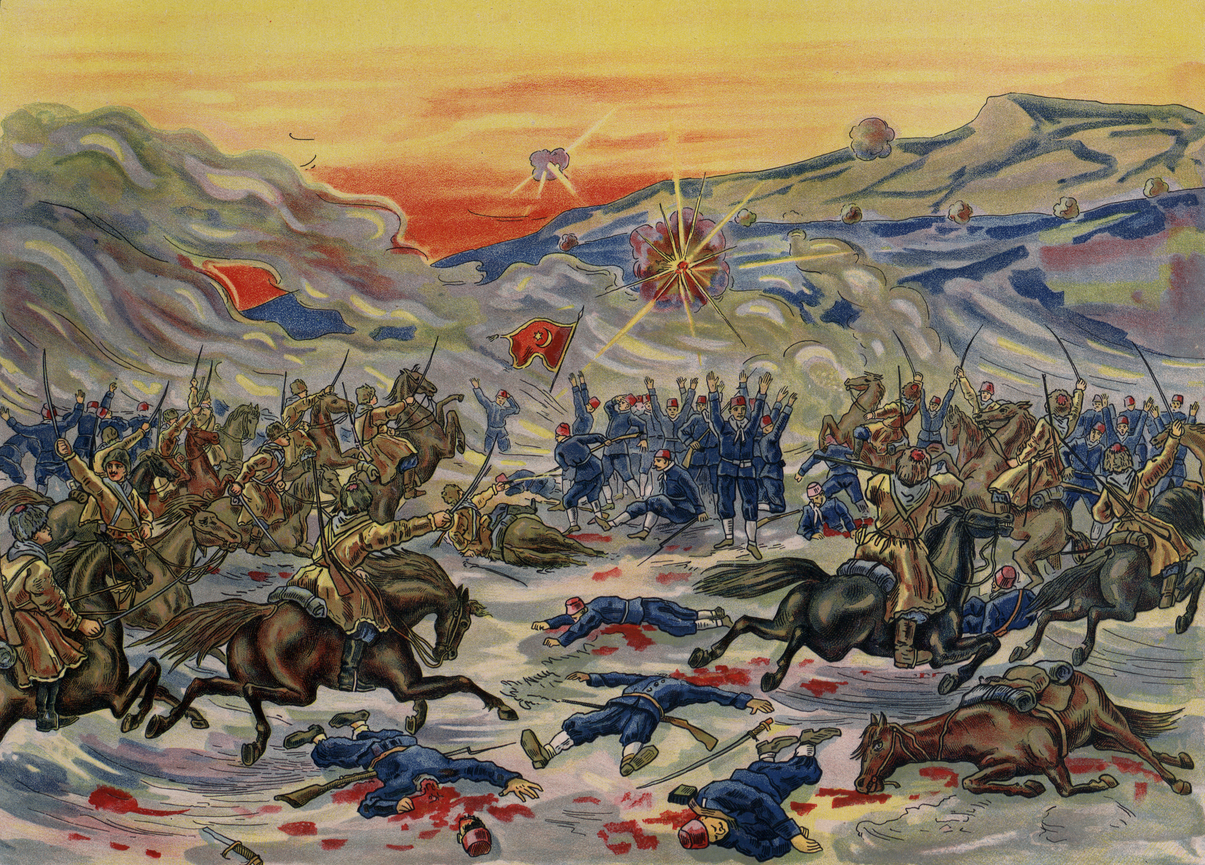
Russian propaganda poster depicting the Russian victory at the Battle of Sarikamish

On December 15, 1914, at the Battle of Ardahan, the city was captured by the Turks. This was an operation commanded by the German Lt. Col. Stange. The mission of Stange Bey Detachment was to conduct highly visible operations to distract and pin down Russian units. Stange Bey's initial mission was to operate in the Chorok region. The unit was materially assisted by the rebellious Adjars of the country, who seized the road. Later Enver modified the original plan toward supporting the Battle of Sarikamish. Stange Bey Detachment was ordered to cut the Russian support link to Sarikamish-Kars line. On January 1, this unit was in Ardahan.

On December 22, at the Battle of Sarikamish, the 3rd Army received the order to advance towards Kars. In the face of the 3rd Army's advance, Governor Vorontsov planned to pull the Russian Caucasus Army back to Kars. Yudenich ignored Vorontsov's wish to withdraw. He stayed to defend Sarikamis. Enver Pasha assumed personal command of the 3rd Army and ordered it into battle against the Russian troops.

=== 1915 ===
On January 6, the 3rd Army headquarters found itself under fire. Hafiz Hakki Pasha ordered a total retreat. On January 7, the remaining forces began their march towards Erzurum. The resulting Battle of Sarikamish became a stunning defeat. Only 10% of the Army managed to retreat back to its starting position. The entire IX Corps surrendered to the Russians. By mid-January less than 18000 of the 95000 Turks who fought the campaign survived. 30000 are said to have died of cold. The mean elevation of the district was 6500 feet above sea level and the Turkish army was supplied by a single railway and snowbound roads.

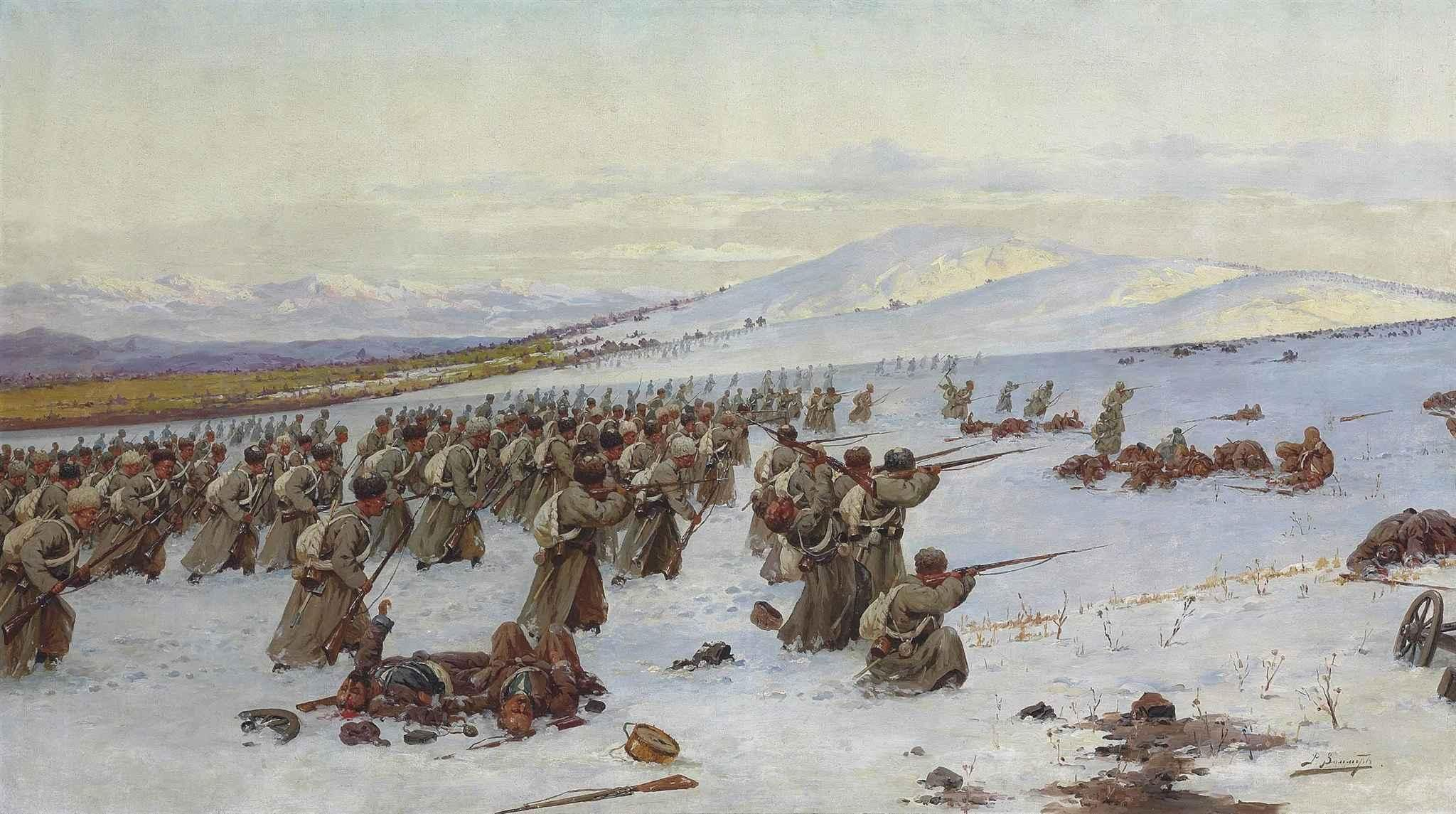
Attack of Russian Army in the Caucasus

After this, Enver gave up command. The Armenian volunteer units were definitely a factor in their defeat, as they challenged the Ottoman operations during critical times, and his experience may have been one of the catalysts that led the Three Pashas, of which one was Enver, to their decision to conduct the Armenian genocide only a few months later. After his return to Constantinople, Enver blamed this defeat on Armenians living in the region actively siding with the Russians.

On January 18, 1915, the Lt. Col. Stange's Turkish unit was recalled from the area around Ardahan. It was to stay behind the lines in the region; only on March 1, 1915, did it regain its initial position.

In February, General Yudenich was praised for the victory and promoted to commander-in-chief of all Russian troops in the Caucasus. The Allies (British and France) asked Russia to relieve the pressure on the Western front. In return, Russia asked the Allies to relieve pressure in the Caucasus by a naval attack. The resulting operations in the Black Sea gave the Russians some respite to replenish their forces. Additionally, actions at the Battle of Gallipoli which aimed at capturing the Ottoman capital helped the Russian forces on this front. On February 12, the commander of the 3rd Army Hafiz Hakki Pasha died of typhus and was replaced by Brigadier General Mahmut Kamil Pasha. Kamil faced the daunting task of putting the Ottoman army back in order. The military planners back in Istanbul were scared of the Russians advancing deeper into the mainland.

During March the strategic situation remained stable. The completely devastated 3rd Army received new blood through reinforcements from the 1st and 2nd Armies, although these supplements were not stronger than a division. The Battle of Gallipoli was draining every Ottoman resource. Meanwhile, the Russians were holding the towns of Eleşkirt, Ağrı and Doğubeyazıt in the south. Military action never escalated above small-scale skirmishes—the Ottomans simply did not have enough forces to secure the whole East Anatolian region.

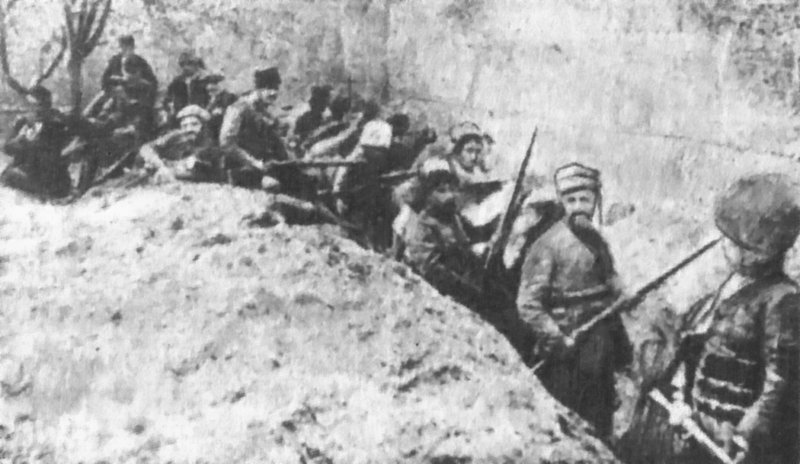
Siege of Van, Armenian troops holding a defense line against Ottoman forces in the walled city of Van in May 1915

On April 20, the resistance at the city of Van began. The Armenian defenders were protecting 30,000 residents and 15,000 refugees with 1,500 able bodied riflemen who were supplied with 300 rifles and 1,000 pistols and antique weapons. The conflict lasted more than three weeks until General Yudenich's force came to rescue them. General Yudenich began an offensive (May 6) moving into Ottoman territory. One wing of this offensive headed towards Lake Van to relieve the Armenian residents of Van. A brigade of Trans-Baikal Cossacks under General Trukhin, and some Armenian volunteers advanced towards Van.

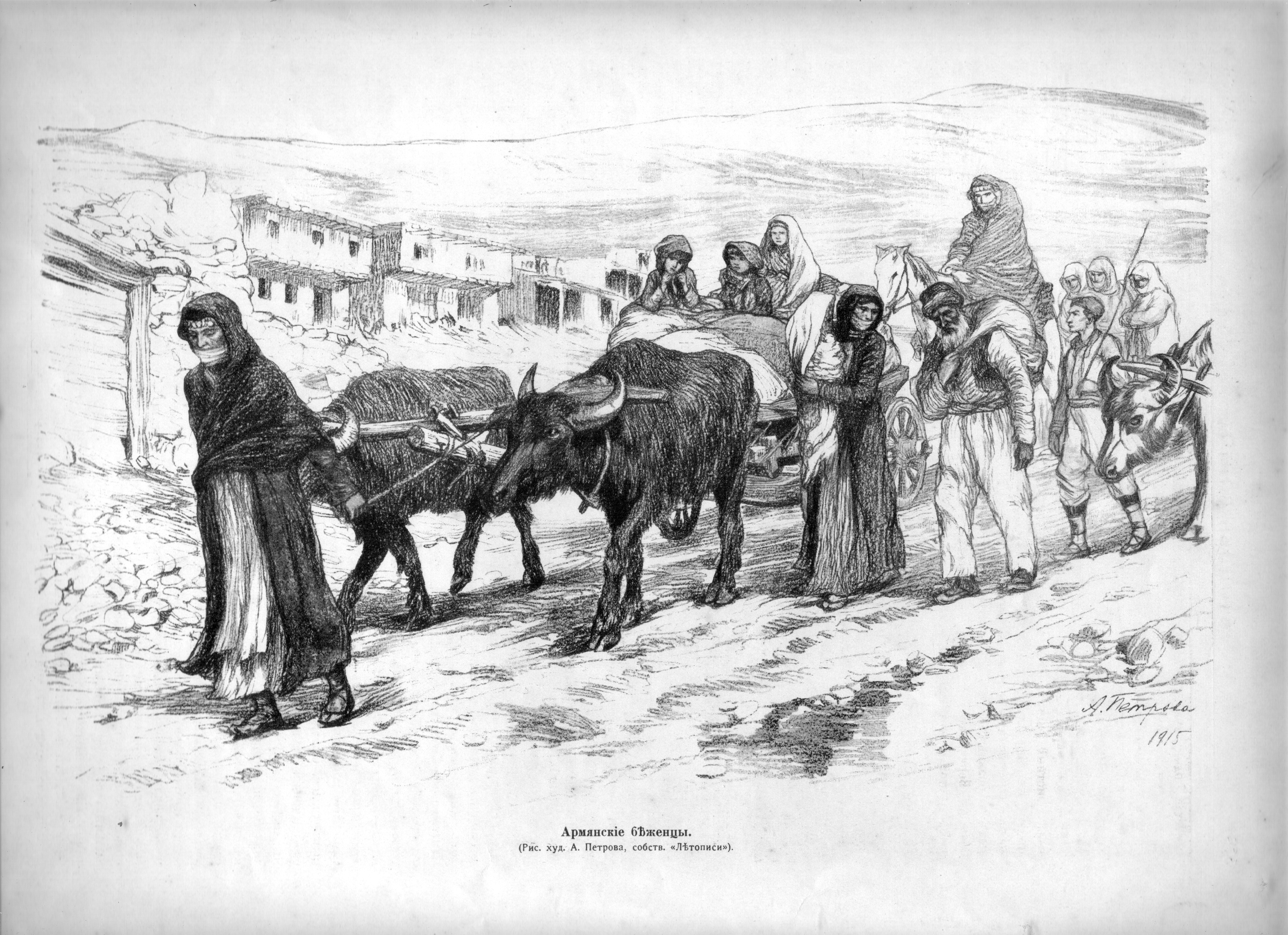
1915, After the Defense of Van behind the retreating Russian forces, 250,000 Armenian refugees fled to the Caucasus

On April 24, Interior minister Mehmed Talat passed the order of April 24 (known by the Armenians as Red Sunday), claimed that the Armenians in this region organized under the leadership of the Russians and rebelled against his government. He claimed the defense of Van from Ottoman massacres to be an example. This was the beginning of the Armenian genocide.

On May 6, the Russian advance began through the Tortum Valley towards Erzurum. The Ottoman 29th and 30th Divisions managed to stop this assault. The Ottoman X Corps counter-attacked the Russian forces. But on the southern part of this advance, Ottoman forces were not as successful as they have been in the north. On May 11 the town of Manzikert had fallen. On May 17, Russian forces entered the town of Van. On May 21, General Yudenich arrived in the city, received the keys to the city and citadel and confirmed the Armenian provisional government in office, with Aram Manukian as governor. The Fedayee turned over the city of Van. With Van secure, fighting shifted farther west for the rest of the summer. Ottoman forces continued to be pushed back. The region south of Lake Van was extremely vulnerable. The Turks had to defend a line of more than 600 kilometers with only 50,000 men and 130 pieces of artillery. They were clearly outnumbered by the Russians. The region was mountainous, thus difficult to attack or defend.

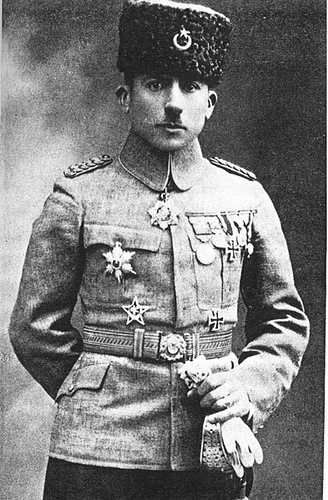
Rafael de Nogales Méndez, a Venezuelan officer who served in the Ottoman army, participated in the Siege of Van and after the war wrote one of the best accounts of the battle and its aftermath.

On May 27, during the Russian offensive, the interior minister of Talat Pasha ordered a forced deportation of all Armenians out of region with the Tehcir Law to the Syria and Mosul.

By June 13, Russian units were back to their starting line. On June 19, the Russians launched another offensive; this time northwest of Lake Van. The Russians, under Oganovski, launched an attack into the hills west of Manzikert. The Russians underestimated the size of the Ottoman army, and were surprised by a large Turkish force which counterattacked. Russian forces began to march from Manzikert towards Mush. However, they were not aware of the fact that the Turkish IX Corps, together with the 17th and 28th Divisions was moving to Mush as well. Although the conditions were extremely difficult, the Turks were executing a very efficient reorganization. 1st and 5th Expeditionary Forces were positioned to the south of the Russian offensive force and a "Right Wing Group" was established under the command of Brigadier General Abdülkerim Paşa. This group was independent from the Third Army and Abdülkerim Paşa was directly reporting to Enver Paşa. The Turks were ready to face the Russian attacks.

On September 24, Grand Duke Nicholas was promoted to being in charge of all Russian forces in the Caucasus. In reality, he was removed from being Supreme Commander of the Russian Caucasus Army which was the highest executive position [actual conduct of the war] for the Caucasus campaign. His replacement was General Yudenich. This front was quiet from October till the end of the year. Yudenich used this period to reorganize. Around the start of 1916, Russian forces reached a level of 200,000 men and 380 pieces of artillery. On the other side the situation was very different; the Ottoman High Command failed to make up the losses during this period. The war in Gallipoli was sucking all the resources and manpower. The IX, X and XI Corps could not be reinforced and in addition to that the 1st and 5th Expeditionary Forces were deployed to Mesopotamia. Enver Pasha, after not achieving his ambitions or recognizing the dire situation on other fronts, decided that the region was of secondary importance. As of January 1916, Ottoman forces were 126,000 men, with only 50,539 being combatants. There were 74,057 rifles, 77 machine guns, and 180 pieces of artillery. The Ottoman force in the Caucasus campaign was large on paper, but not on the ground. The Ottomans assumed that the Russians would not bother to attack. This assumption turned out to be false.

=== 1916 ===
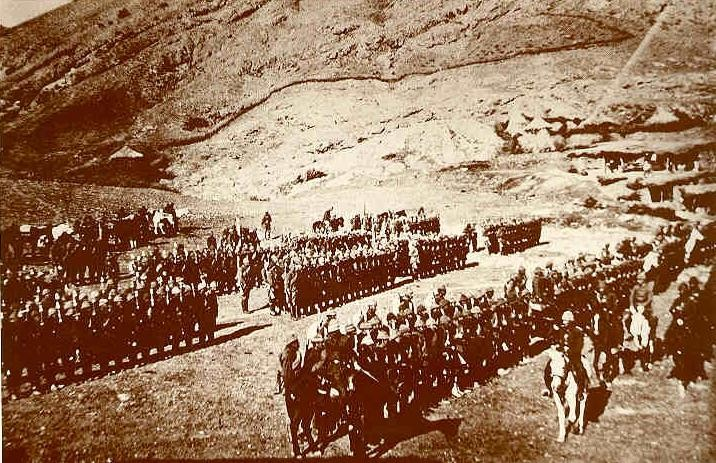
Mustafa Kemal at Bitlis, March 1916

In early January, Yudenich secretly left his winter quarters and marched towards the major Ottoman fort at Erzurum. The winter is not normally a time for military activity in this part of the world. The bitter cold and terrible roads contributed greatly to the annihilation of Enver Pasha's 3rd Army in the previous year. The Russian General Yudenich viewed this as an opportunity to take the Ottomans by surprise. The Russians achieved total surprise and destroyed an Ottoman division that was in winter quarters in the Battle of Koprukoy (January 10–18).

On February 16, Mahmut Kamil was forced to order the 3rd Army to retreat from the city, as Yudenich had a numerical advantage over the Ottoman army. The difference was not big enough to be decisive, so Yudenich's plan was to attack the center of the Ottoman defenses, with the key attack falling in a weakly held sector. While diversionary attacks held the attention of Mahmut Kamil near the Deve-Boyun ridge, Russian forces broke through at Forts Kara-gobek and Tafet. The result was that both rings of the cities' defenses had been penetrated.

In April, the Caucasus army moved in two directions from Erzurum. Part went north and captured the ancient port city of Trabzon. The other part moved in the direction of Mush and Bitlis .These units pushed the 2nd Army deep into Anatolia and defeated the Turks in the Battles of Mush and Bitlis (March 2 – August 24), driving the Ottoman army before it. Bitlis was the last defence point for the Ottoman Army to prevent the Russians from moving into central Anatolia and Mesopotamia.

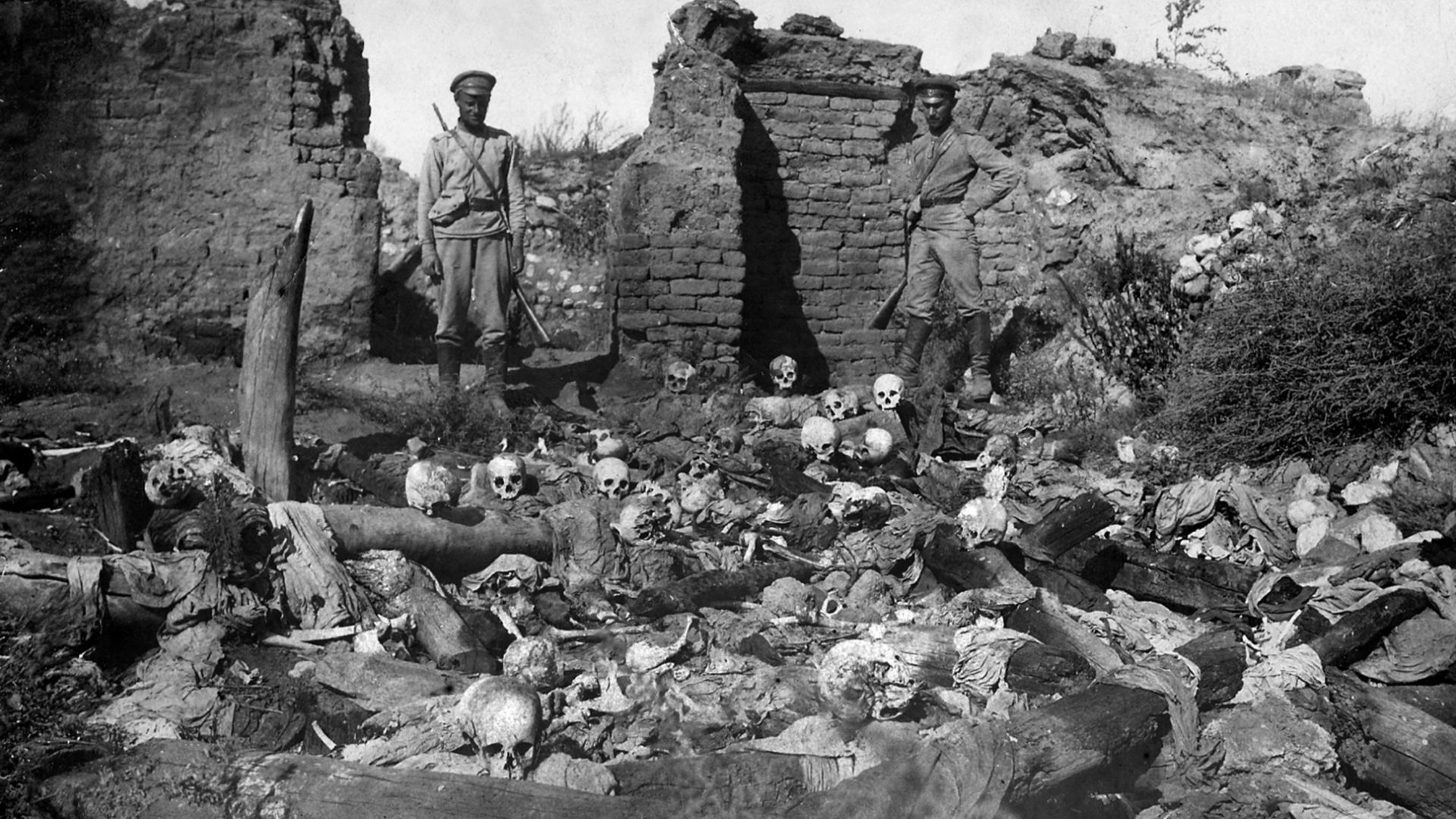
Russian soldiers uncover the evidence of a massacre in the former Armenian village of Sheykhalan (in Muş), 1916

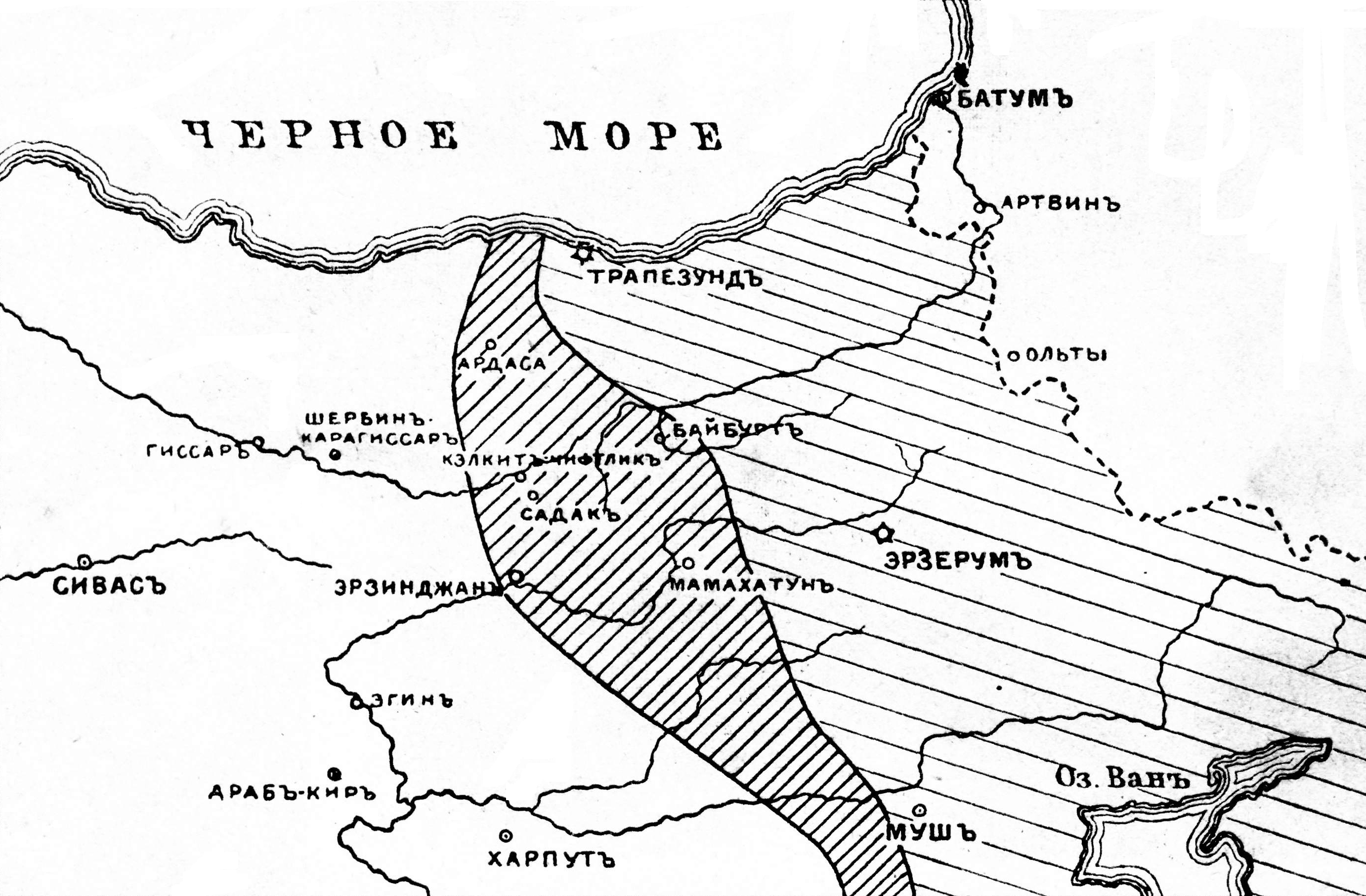
The area of Russian occupation of that region in summer 1916 (Russian map).

During July, General Yudenich then countered the Ottoman attack with an offensive of his own towards Erzincan. This was the Battle of Erzincan (July 2–25). On July 2, Erzincan was captured. The Ottoman offensive against Trabzon was halted as they tried to stabilize their front lines to prevent the Russians from entering Anatolia and Mesopotamia.

After their defeat, the Ottoman Army gave Mustafa Kemal the organization of the defense of the region in August. The region was controlled by the 2nd Army. When Mustafa Kemal was assigned to his post, the enemy forces were in constant advance. Fighting around the east side of Lake Van continued throughout the summer but was inconclusive. In the earlier periods of the campaign, the XVI Corps managed to take Bitlis and Mush. Ahmet İzzet Paşa decided to attack one week after the conclusion of the Russian offensive. A military force was gathered and sent marching along the coast. The Second Army advanced on August 2. While Nikolai Nikolaevich Yudenich was in the north and pushing the Ottoman 3rd Army, the Ottoman 2nd Army was in the south facing the insurgency and the second branch of the Russian army under General Tovmas Nazarbekian and a detachment of Armenian volunteer units led by Andranik Ozanian. After fighting from 1–9 August 1916, the Ottoman Army was overwhelmed and the entire region fell to the Russian Empire and Armenian volunteers, and thus an assault on Van was prevented.

By late September, the Ottoman attack ended. The cost for the 2nd Army was 30,000 killed and wounded. The Russians strengthened their lines. They were strong enough to respond with counteroffensives two weeks after the launch of the Ottoman offensive. The Russians held up the advance.

From September to the Russian Revolution, the Russian Navy still dominated the Black Sea.

The rest of the year 1916 was spent by the Turks making organizational and operational changes in the Caucasian front. Fortunately for the Ottoman commanders, the Russians were quiet during this period. The winter of 1916–17 was extremely harsh, which made fighting nearly impossible.

=== 1917 ===
Western Armenia territory under Russian control as of September 1917

The military situation did not change during the spring of 1917. The Russian plans for a renewed attack never substantiated. Meanwhile, Russia was in political and social turmoil. It was also influencing the army ranks. The chaos caused by the Russian Revolution put a stop to all Russian military operations. The Russian forces began to conduct withdrawals. Neither the Russian soldiers nor the Russian people wanted to continue the war. The Russian army slowly disintegrated. Starting from the spring of 1917, the situation was completely disadvantageous as a renewed typhus, scurvy and similar problems resulting from hygiene and food, became very common in the Caucasian army.

Until the Russian Revolution of 1917, the Ottoman Empire's possible operation in Caucasia could not be imagined. After the Battle of Sarikamish, the Ottoman units were "almost always" in a disastrous situation trying to hold onto regions in the occupied Ottoman lands. The Ottoman forces could not take advantage of the chaotic situation during 1917, as their units were not in good shape. Enver moved five divisions out of the region because of the pressure from the British in Palestine and Mesopotamia.

On March 1, the order "Number–1" published by Petrograd Soviet of Workers' and Soldiers' Deputies included paragraphs envisioning democratization of the army. This written command enabled military units to elect their representatives. On March 9, 1917, a Special Transcaucasian Committee was established with Member of the State Duma V. A. Kharlamov as the chairman to replace the Imperial Viceroy Grand Duke Nicholas Nikolaevich of Russia (1856–1929) by the Russian Provisional Government as the highest organ of civil administrative body in Transcaucasia. The new government reassigned General Yudenich to a position in Central Asia. General Yudenich retired from the army following the assignment.

During the summer, during the occupation of Turkish Armenia the Russians sponsored a conference to consider emergency measures and adopted plans to form a 20,000 man militia under Andranik to be ready in December 1917. Civilian commissioner Dr. Hakob Zavriev promoted Andranik to Major General. Andranik's division's composition was this:

- 1st brigade:
  - Erzinjan regiment
  - Erzurum regiment
- 2nd brigade:
  - Khnus regiment
  - Alashkert regiment
- 3rd brigade:
  - Van regiment
  - mounted Zeytoun regiment

On September 14, 1917, the Russian army in the region, which was about to completely disintegrate, lost commanding authority, and the tendency of the villagers for plundering had increased. Towards the end of autumn, the Chief General of the Caucasus Front Przhevalskii had already ordered the establishment of national Armenian and Georgian forces within the Army to slow down the disintegration. The problems of demobilization of Russian Army (on all fronts Russians had the same problems) would in a way bring the end of the Russian government and help the Bolsheviks to come into power easily. In November 1917, the first government of the independent Transcaucasia was created in Tbilisi as the "Transcaucasian Commissariat (Transcaucasian Sejm)" which replaced the "Transcaucasian Committee" following the Bolshevik seizure of power in St. Petersburg.

The Transcaucasian Sejm was headed by a Georgian Menshevik, Nikolay Chkheidze. However, the Transcaucasian Sejm failed to stop the degradation of forces in the region into smaller national forces. While Armenians sent representatives to the Transcaucasian Sejm, at the same time the Eastern Armenian leaders at Yerevan tried to established an Armenian Army Corps. Armenians had planned to keep their existence based on a political strategy of being supportive of the Allies and Russia and to establish their national army with Russian support. General Nazarbekov was selected as Commanding Officer.

- 1st Division commander General Christophor Araratov was assigned by Yerevan:
  - 1st Erzurum and Erzinjan regiment,
  - 2nd Khnus regiment,
  - 3rd Yerevan regiment,
  - 4th Erzinjan and Yerevan regiments.
- 2nd Division's commander Colonel Movses Silikyan was also assigned by Erivan:
  - 5th Van regiment,
  - 6th Yerevan regiment,
  - 7th and 8th Alexandropol regiments.

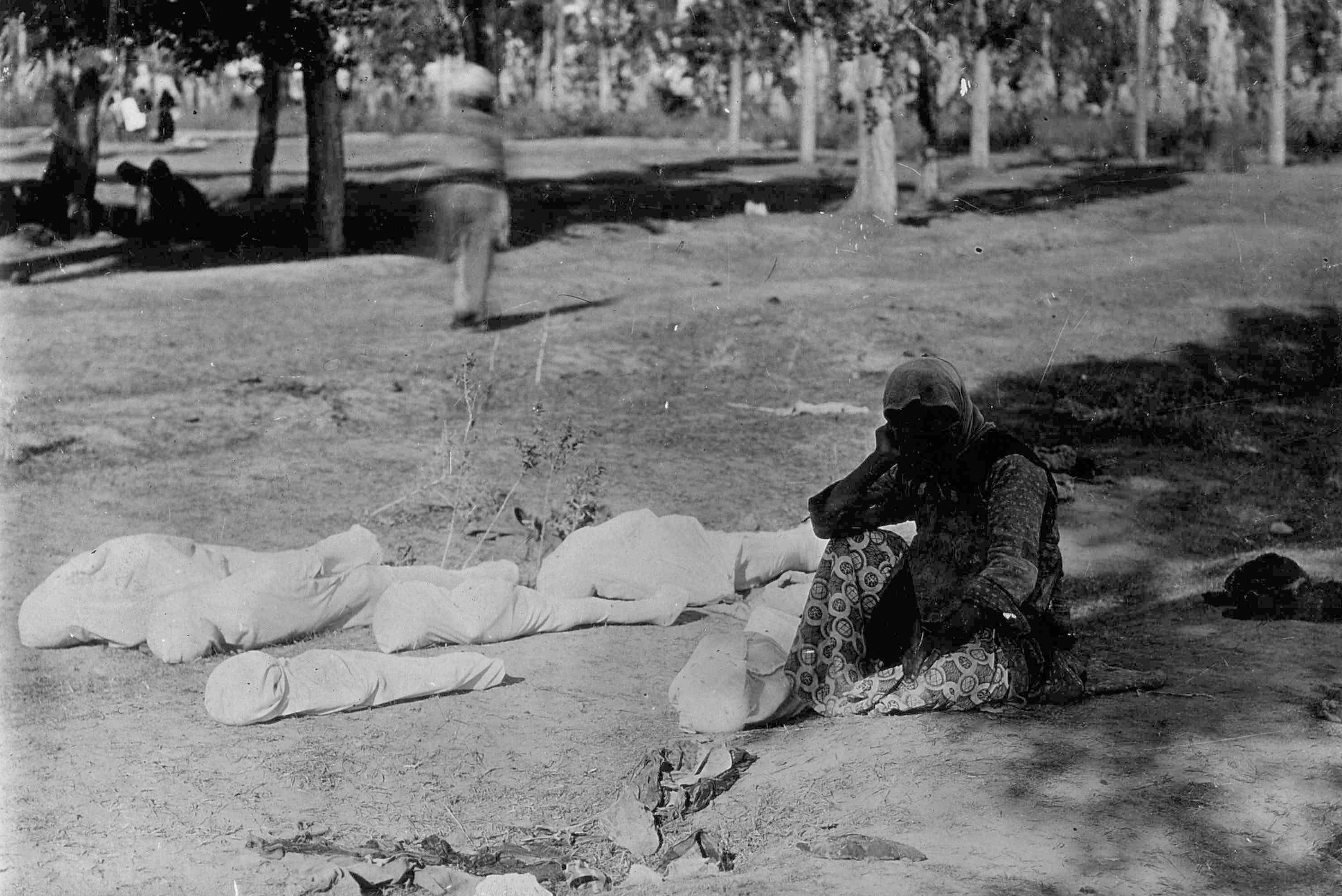
An Armenian mother beside the corpses of her five children

The Chief of Staff of the Armenian Corps was General Vickinski. The divisions, which comprised four regiments each, also had three regular and one depot regiment. Their total strength was 32,000 enlisted men. Besides these regular structures able men were also armed. A 40 to 50,000-strong force formed from this armed civilian population. In Baku alone, the Russian army left 160 cannons, 180 machine guns, and 160 million cartridges to the Armenians.

On October 23, during the October Revolution, the Ottoman Third Army was protecting the 190 km area from the Munzur Mountains to the Black Sea with 66 battalions consisting of 30,000 combatants, 177 machine guns, and 157 cannons. The number of machine guns, animals, supply, transportation and clothing were all problematic. Russia had strengthened Erzurum and Trabzon. Russia had 9; the Ottomans had 3 planes. The Russian forces were in a line from the west of Trabzon, along the Erzincan-Kemah passage, passing through south of Tunceli and Murat waters to Lake Van and to Baskale. On this line, the Russian army against the Third Army had 86,000 combatants and 146 cannons. The situation was a stalemate.

On December 5, 1917, the armistice of Erzincan (Erzincan Cease-fire Agreement) was signed by the Russians and Ottomans in Erzincan. It ended the fighting between Russia and the Ottoman Empire. Between December and February 7 the regiments of the Armenian Corps were immediately hustled off to the front. They created a spectacle en route, for, to the amazement of the homeward-bound Russian soldiers, they were moving toward, not away from, the forward lines. Russian soldiers left equipment and guns to the newly constructed Armenian national army. After the nationalization (or "democratization" in some sources) of these left over forces throughout 1917, there was no effective Russian military force in the region by the end of 1917.

At the turn of 1918, the Allied Powers, the Cossacks in the south, the Georgians, the Pontic Greeks, and the Armenians were willing to build a resistance line against the Ottomans through gathering in the region. In case of an agreement between Russia and the Ottoman Empire, this was the only strategy to continue fighting against the Ottomans. The Armenians that kept their position in the region after the withdrawal of the Russian soldiers from the Caucasian front had taken support of 1 million rubles from Britain.

=== 1918 ===
The Bolshevik revolution left Russia's vast southern territories unguarded, except for a few thousand Armenian volunteers equipped with castoff Russian arms, commanded by Tovmas Nazarbekian and an even smaller force of refugees from western Anatolia led by Andranik Ozanian, spread along a line extending from Yerevan to Van and Erzinjan. On 2 February, Turkish forces launched an attack at the disintegrated Caucasus front that was abandoned by Russian Troops. Having defeated the scattered and poorly-organized Georgian and Armenian units, Ottoman forces quickly recovered the territories that were lost previously to Imperial Russia in 1915–17, The Ottomans invaded the former Russian possessions in the Caucasus and the Secession of the Region from Russia. The Third Army's offense headed by Vehib Pasha began on February 5. The Ottoman forces moved through east of the line between Tirebolu and Bitlis and took Kelkit on February 7, Erzincan on February 13, Bayburt on February 19, Tercan on February 22, and the Black Sea port of Trabzon on February 24. The incoming sea-borne reinforcements began to disembark at Trabzon. Manzikert, Hınıs, Oltu, Köprüköy and Tortum followed over the following two weeks. By March 24 the Ottoman forces were crossing the 1914 frontier into what had been Russian Empire territory.

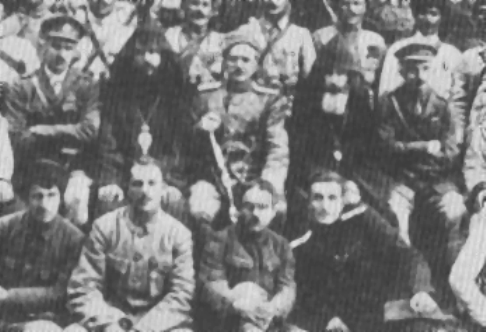
During 1918 General Andranik made it possible for the Armenian population of Van to escape from the Ottoman Army to Eastern Armenia. He and his troops fought between Mountainous Karabagh and Zangezur where the Republic of Mountainous Armenia was declared.

On March 3, the Grand vizier Talat Pasha signed the Treaty of Brest-Litovsk with the Russian SFSR. Bolshevik Russia ceded Batum, Kars, and Ardahan, which the Russians had captured during the Russo-Turkish War (1877–1878). The treaty also stipulated that Transcaucasia was to be declared independent. In addition to these provisions, a secret clause was inserted which obliged the Russians to demobilize Armenian national forces.

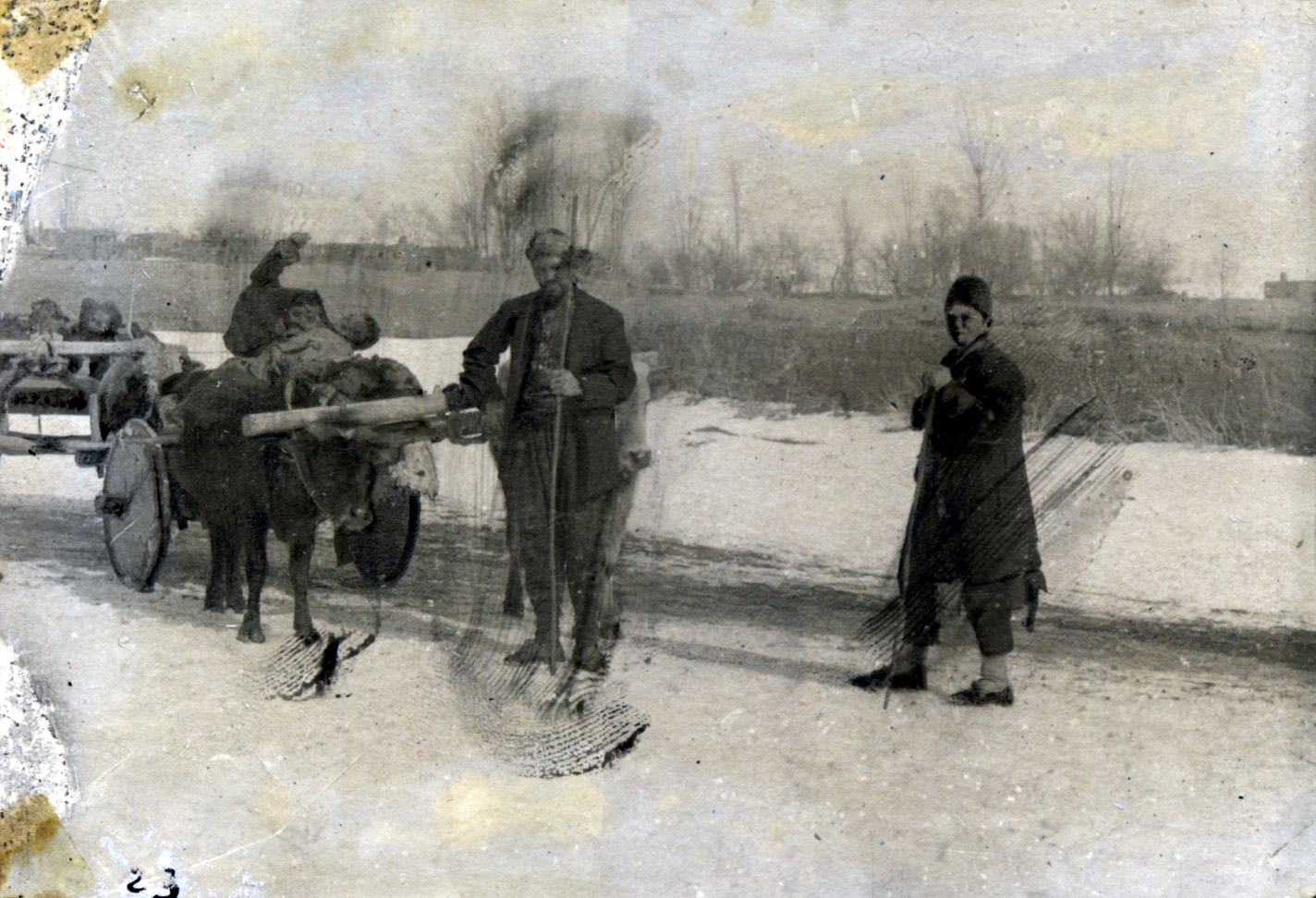
Collection of civilian corpses from Erzinzan

A peace conference between the Ottomans and a delegation of the Transcaucasian Diet convened on March 14. Enver Pasha offered to surrender all claims in the Caucasus in return for recognition of the Ottoman re-acquisition of the east Anatolian provinces as agreed to at Brest-Litovsk. On April 5, the head of the Transcaucasian delegation Akaki Chkhenkeli accepted the Treaty of Brest-Litovsk as a basis for more negotiations and wired the governing bodies urging them to accept this position. The mood prevailing in Tiflis was very different. Tiflis acknowledged the existence of a state of war between themselves and the Ottoman Empire.

On 14 April, the Ottomans with 10,000-12,000 troops captured the port of Batumi and its garrison of 3,000 troops after two days of light fighting. On April 23, 1918, the Ottomans laid siege to the fortress city of Kars, now under the effective control of Armenian and non-Bolshevik Russian troops. The fortress had been strengthened considerably by the Russians since its capture in 1877, and the garrison was strong and well-stocked. The garrison numbered some 10,000 men, and they had at their disposal 154 fixed artillery pieces, 67 reserve artillery pieces, 46 fortress machine guns, 20 reserve machine guns, and 11,000 rifles.

Transcaucasian Democratic Federative Republic foreign minister Akaki Chkhenkeli had previously ordered the city to surrender at first contact with the Ottomans, doing so without the notice of the Armenian members of his coalition government; while not followed, the order threw the defenders into confusion and partly caused the exodus of thousands of civilians before and during the siege. Independent of this, it was clear to all involved that the Armenians, surrounded, outnumbered, and cut off from relief, could not hold the city indefinitely. As a result, the garrison scrambled for a way to negotiate their way out without having to fight for the city. The Ottomans agreed to let the garrison peacefully exit the city, but only if they would surrender the entire fortress and its armory intact. General Nazarbekov, the Armenian Corps Commander based in Yerevan acting through a French intermediary, agreed to the surrender of the city and its garrison on April 25, 1918. At the same time the batteries surrounding the city were occupied and in the evening a regiment from the Ottoman I Caucasian Corps entered into the city and took it under control. The Ottomans obtained 11,000 rifles, 2 million bullets, 67 cannons, and 19 machine guns from the surrender.

On May 11, a new peace conference opened at Batum, at which the Ottomans extended their demands to include Tiflis as well as Alexandropol and Echmiadzin. The Armenian and Georgian members of the Republic's delegation stalled. The Ottoman army moved once again on May 21, leading to the Battle of Sardarapat (May 21–29), the Battle of Kara Killisse (1918) (May 24–28), and the Battle of Bash Abaran (May 21–24). Although the Armenians managed to inflict a defeat on the Ottomans, the Armenian army was scattered. Meanwhile, there was a fruitless German-mediated peace conference between the Ottoman and Transcaucasian governments at Batumi, which closed on May 24, 1918. Two days later, Georgia withdrew from the federation and declared itself a separate republic, encouraged by the German mission led by Friedrich Freiherr Kress von Kressenstein and Friedrich Werner von der Schulenburg: the independent Democratic Republic of Georgia was proclaimed, formalized by the Treaty of Poti. On the same day, the First Republic of Armenia declared its independence, followed by the Azerbaijan Democratic Republic.

On June 4, the First Republic of Armenia was forced to sign the Treaty of Batum. However, under the leadership of Andranik Ozanian Armenians in the mountainous Karabag region resisted the Ottoman 3rd Army throughout the summer and established the Republic of Mountainous Armenia. In August, they set up an independent government in Shusha, the administrative center of the region.

In June, German troops arrived to compete with the Ottomans for Caucasian influence and resources, notably the oilfields at Baku. Early in June, the Ottoman army under Vehip Pasha renewed its offensive on the main road to Tiflis, where they confronted a joint German-Georgian force. On June 10, the 3rd Army attacked and took many prisoners, leading to an official threat from Berlin to withdraw all of its troops and support for the Ottoman Empire. The Ottoman government had to concede to German pressure and to halt, for the moment, a further advance into Georgia, reorienting its strategic direction towards Azerbaijan and Iran. A Georgian delegation composed of Chkhenkeli, Zurab Avalishvili, and Niko Nikoladze went to Berlin to negotiate a treaty — which was aborted by the German collapse in November.

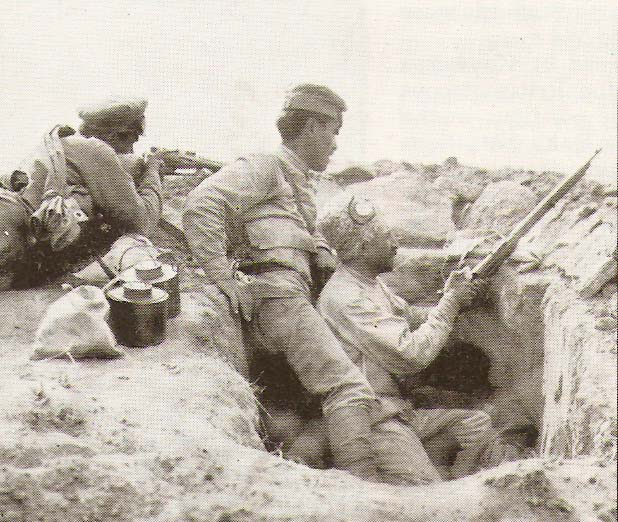
Armenian defenders during the Battle of Baku.

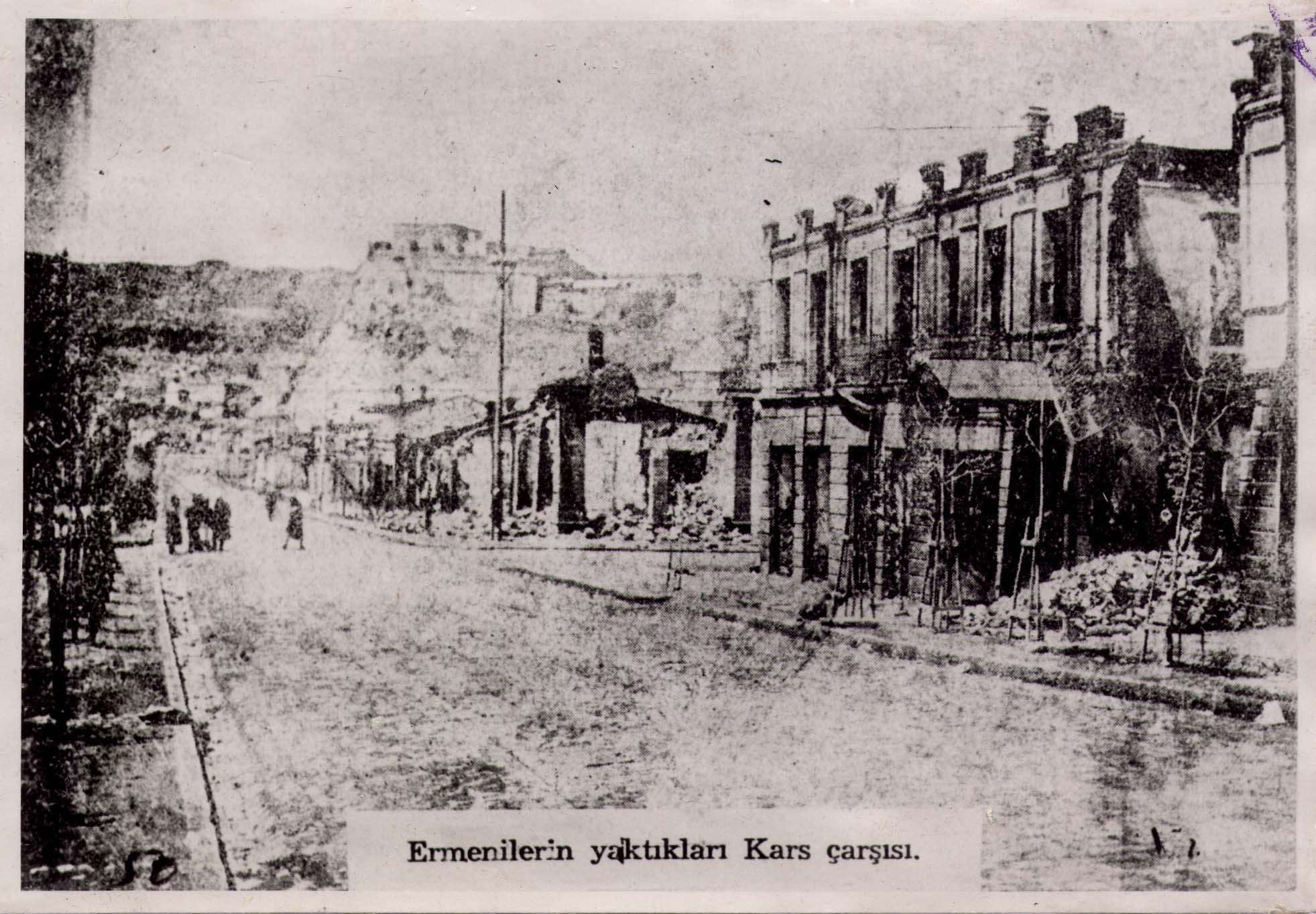
Kars shopping district

Enver Pasha had created a new force in March, named the Army of Islam, although it only had somewhere between 14,000 and 25,000 men. All were Muslims and most spoke Turkish. In July, he ordered them into the Centrocaspian Dictatorship, with the goal of occupying Baku, which they took from the British in September.

In October, Ottoman troops pursued General Andranik's Armenian forces into mountainous Karabagh and Zangezur. The conflict was fierce, but indecisive. The Armenian militia under Andranik's command decimated an Ottoman unit trying to advance to the Varanda River. The armed conflicts between these units continued until the Armistice of Mudros was signed on October 30. By then the Ottomans had re-captured all the territory which they lost to the Russians in Eastern Anatolia. The Armistice enabled General Andranik to create a base for further advancing eastward and to form a strategic corridor extending into Nakhichevan.

== Casualties ==
Anton Kernosovsky, writing in 1938, reports the Russian casualties for the campaign as: 22,000 killed, 71,000 wounded, 6,000 captured and up to 20,000 frostbitten; giving a total of 119,000 as well as 8 guns lost. For the lesser period of June–September 1916, historians William Allen and Pavel Muratov report there was an irrecoverable loss of 50,000. The Ottomans are reported to have taken 9,216 prisoners in the Caucasus up until the collapse of the Russian Empire.

Kernosovsky reports the Ottomans lost 350,000 casualties and 650 guns. Allen and Muratoff report the Ottoman casualties to have exceeded 300,000. This includes losses from sickness and desertion. Alexei Oleynikov and Andrey Borisyuk estimate the Ottoman combat losses at 300,000. Using records from the Ottoman Archives, the American historian Edward J. Erickson estimated Ottoman losses in this campaign by battle or phase, with a total of 235,733 battle casualties (83,083 killed in action, 113,570 critically wounded [disabled] and 39,080 prisoners). Kernosovsky however, reports that 100,000 Ottomans were captured. Oleynikov, using Russian reports on the transportation of prisoners to work also estimates there were about 100,000 Ottoman prisoners. Sergei Oldenburg, based on documents from the Russian embassy in Paris, reports there were 65,000 Ottoman prisoners.

Historian Uğur Ümit Üngör, the author of Confiscation and Destruction: The Young Turk Seizure of Armenian Property, said many atrocities were carried out against the local Turks and Kurds by the Russian army and its Armenian volunteer units. A large part of the local Muslim Turks and Kurds fled west after the Russian invasion of 1916. According to some reports, the number of Muslims killed by the troops of the Russian coalition is 600,000 people.

== Armenian genocide ==
During the Caucasus campaign, Ottoman Armenia was depopulated of much of the entire Christian Armenian population as part of the Armenian genocide. The Armenian population was either forced on long death marches to camps in the middle of the Syrian desert to die of disease, abuse by guards, massacres, Kurdish raids along the way, and starvation or, if they refused, be indiscriminately massacred. Both scenarios accomplished the goal of the Ottoman Turks, removal of Armenians from their homelands to continue their occupation of Western Armenia. The ethnic cleansings and massacres resulted in the deaths of between 600,000 and 1.5 million Armenians, the destruction of thousands of years of Armenian heritage in the form of monasteries, churches, cemeteries, houses, schools, and other buildings, a massive expansion of the Armenian diaspora in countries like France and the United States, and a continuous contention between the modern states of Turkey and Armenia.

== Aftermath ==
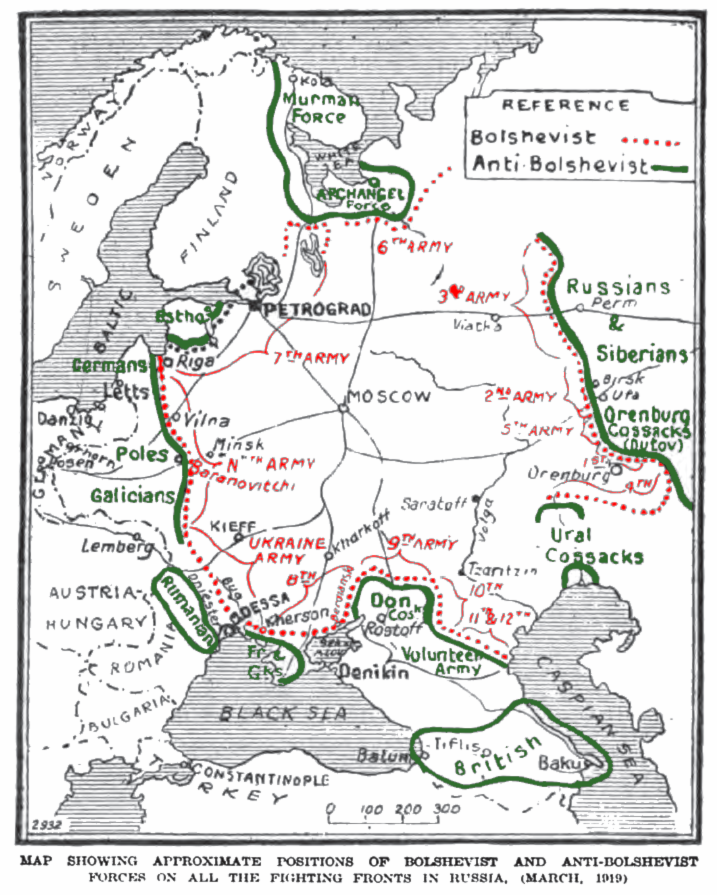
Place of Dunsterforce forces after Armistice

The Ottoman Empire lost World War I to the Allies, but the borders in the Caucasus were not settled. Two years after the armistice, a peace treaty was signed between the Allied and Associated Powers and Ottoman Empire at Sèvres on August 10, 1920. The Russians held the strategic initiative throughout the war, culminating in operations in 1916 when two of the most combat-ready Turkish armies were virtually destroyed. By 1917, it was planned to completely capture Ottoman Iraq, the Russians were supposed to take Mosul, but the coming revolution prevented this. After Russia's actual withdrawal from the war, the Turks returned almost all of their territories, but were unable to capture Armenia. With the subsequent Russian Civil War this allowed for the Ottoman's (Islamic Army of the Caucasus) led by Enver Pasha to advance deep into South Caucasus causing the dissolution of the Transcaucasian DFR in which the Islamic Army of the Caucasus had reached the Caspian Sea and won a decisive victory at Battle of Baku effectively ending the war.

=== Territorial disputes ===
After the war, The Georgian-Armenian War 1918 soon followed over the Javakheti and Lori provinces, with Armenia gaining the latter. Armenia and Azerbaijan engaged in the Armenian-Azerbaijani war (1918–1920) over Karabakh and Nakhichevan, with Armenia losing both due to Soviet intervention in favour of the anti west Turkish National Movement. The Turkish–Armenian War of 1920 resulted in the occupation/depopulation of even more Armenian land.

=== Sovietization of Caucasus ===
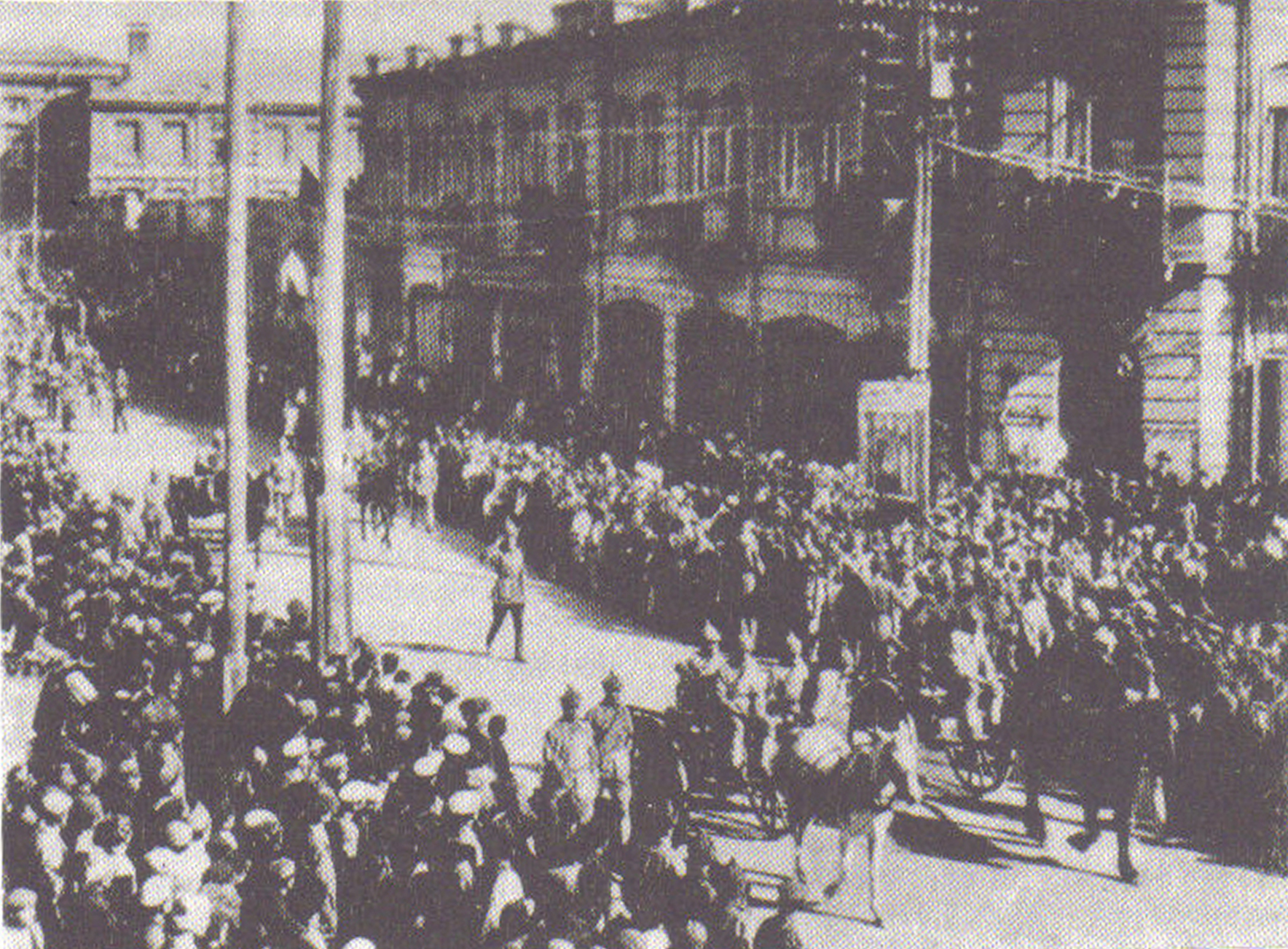
The Soviet 11th Red Army enters Yerevan in 1920.

On April 27, 1920, the government of the Azerbaijan Democratic Republic (ADR) received a notice that the Soviet army was about to cross the northern border and invade the ADR. In the west, there was a war over Karbakh with Armenia; in the east, the local Azeri communists were rebelling against the government; and to the north the Russian Red Army was steadily moving southward having defeated Denikin's White Russian forces. ADR officially surrendered to the Soviets, but many generals and local Azeri militias kept resisting the advance of the Soviet forces and it took a while for the Soviets to stabilize the newly proclaimed Azerbaijan Soviet Socialist Republic. On December 4, 1920, the government of the First Republic of Armenia effectively surrendered. On December 5, the Armenian Revolutionary Committee (Revkom) made up of mostly Armenians from mountainous Karabakh entered Yerevan. On December 6, Felix Dzerzhinsky's dreaded secret police, Cheka entered the city, thus effectively ending all existence of the First Republic of Armenia. The Armenian Soviet Socialist Republic was proclaimed, under the leadership of Aleksandr Miasnikyan. On February 25, 1921, the Soviet destruction of the Democratic Republic of Georgia happened.

On October 23, 1921, the end of hostilities came with the Treaty of Kars. It was a successor treaty to the earlier Treaty of Moscow of March 1921, and was ratified in Yerevan on September 11, 1922. The Soviet Union signed the Treaty of Kars, which was a treaty between the Grand National Assembly of Turkey, which had declared Turkey a republic in 1923, and representatives of Bolshevist Russia, Soviet Armenia, Soviet Azerbaijan, and Soviet Georgia (all these states formed part of the Soviet Union after the December 1922 Union Treaty) in 1921.

== See also ==
- List of states and regions involved in the Russian Civil War
- Bibliography of the Russian Revolution and Civil War
- Outline of the Russian Revolution and Civil War
- Persian campaign
- Armenian genocide
- Black Sea naval campaign of World War I
- Sykes–Picot Agreement
- Russo-Turkish Wars
