= Andranik (given name) =

- Gender: Male
- Language: Armenian

Origin
- Region of origin: Armenia

Other names
- Alternative spelling: Antranig, Antranik

Andranik (Armenian: Անդրանիկ pronounced Andranik in Eastern Armenian or Antranig in Western Armenian, is a given name to Armenian males. In Armenian, it means "first-born child in the family".

With the addition of -yan or -ian (Armenian: Անդրանիկյան / Անդրանիկեան pronounced Andranikyan in Eastern Armenian / Antranigian in Western Armenian it becomes a common Armenian family name.

== People ==
Andranik and its variant pronunciations Antranig / Antranik may refer to:

=== Andranik ===
- Andranik (1865–1927), Armenian military leader, statesman and fedayee
- Andranik Adamyan, Armenian football manager
- Andranik Eskandarian (born 1951), Iranian American football (soccer) player
- Andranik Hakobyan (born 1959), Armenian poet
- Andranik Hakobyan (born 1981), Armenian boxer
- Andranik Hakobyan (born 2005), Armenian footballer
- Andranik Karapetyan (born 1995), Armenian weightlifter
- Andranik Khachatryan (born 1956), Soviet Armenian footballer
- Andranik Madadian (born 1959), better known by his stage name Andy, Armenian-Iranian singer-songwriter
- Andranik Makaryan (born 1966), Armenian general
- Andranik Margaryan (1951–2007), Armenian politician, Prime Minister of Armenia (2000–2007)
- Andranik Migranyan (born 1949), Russian political scientist
- Andranik Ovassapian (1936–2010), Armenian American anesthesiologist
- Andranik Ozanian (1865–1927), also known as General Andranik (Zōravar Andranik), was an Armenian general
- Andranik Tangian (born 1952), Soviet-German mathematician
- Andranik Tevanyan (born 1974), Armenian politician and parliamentarian
- Andranik Teymourian (born 1983), Iranian football player
- Andranik Voskanyan (born 1990), Armenian footballer

=== Andronik ===
- Andronik Iosifyan (1905–1993), Soviet engineer, chief electrician of Soyuz and R-7 Semyorka
- Andronik Karagezyan (born 1974), Russian footballer

=== Antranig ===
- Antranig Chalabian (1922–2011), medical illustrator, cartographer and historian
- Antranig Dzarugian (1913–1989), Armenian diasporan Armenian writer, poet, educator and journalist

=== Antranick ===
- Antranick Apelian (1929–2017), French rugby league footballer

== Sports ==
- Antranik Youth Association, Lebanese-Armenian multi-sports and cultural club
- Antranik Youth Association (basketball), Lebanese-Armenian basketball team
- Antranik Youth Association (football), Lebanese-Armenian football club
- FC Andranik, Armenian football club

== Others ==
- Andranikological Review, an Armenian youth historical half-yearly periodical published in Yerevan, in 2002–2004
- General Andranik (Yerevan Metro), metro station
