= Sarkis Jebejian =

Sarkis Jebejian

Sarkis Jebejian (Armenian: Սարգիս Ճէպէճեան, Jebeji, 1864–1920) was an Armenian military leader, the head of the self-defense of Hadjin (1920).

== Biography ==
Jebejian was born in Kayseri. In 1914 when he witnessed the extermination of Armenian soldiers in the Turkish army, he fled and joined General Andranik Ozanian's volunteer unit in Caucasus. In April 1915 he participated in the Battle of Dilman. Then as a lieutenant of Andranik's Special Striking Division he participated in Zangezur's self-defense.

Being in confrontation with Dashnak authorities, he, as his commander Andranik, left Armenian Republic in 1919 and moved to Constantinople, then Cilicia. In 1920 he became the Commander of the Supreme Council of self-defense of Hadjin, and heroically fought during nine months. He was wounded and fell during the last days of self-defense.

According to Tsatur Aghayan, Jebejian was "one of these heroic militants of General Andranik, who, being from Caesaria, was mobilized into Turkish army and sent to Caucasian front".
