= Musayelyan =

Musayelyan may refer to:

- Musayelyan, Shirak, a village in northern part of Shirak province, Armenia
- Basen, Armenia, a village in the eastern part of Shirak province, Armenia formerly known as Musayelyan
