= Andranik =

Armenian military leader (1865–1927)

Andranik Անդրանիկ
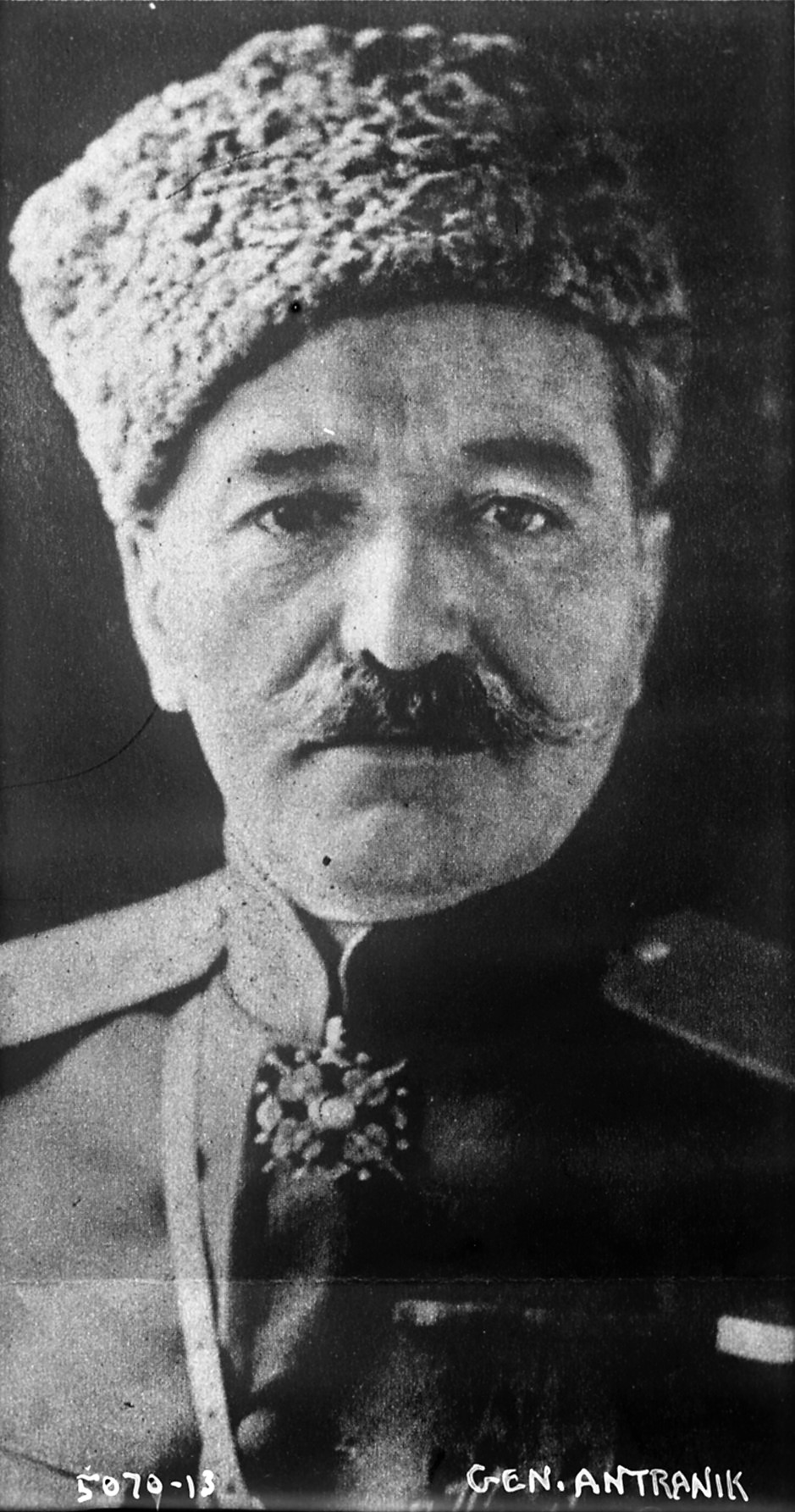
- General Andranik Ozanian, wearing his uniform and medals with a papakha hat
- Born: 25 February 1865; Shabin-Karahisar, Ottoman Empire
- Died: 31 August 1927 (aged 62); Richardson Springs, California, U.S.
- Burial place: Ararat Cemetery (1927–1928); Père Lachaise (1928–2000); Yerablur (2000–present)
- Military career
- Allegiance: Dashnaktsutyun (1892–1907); Bulgaria (1912–1913); Russian Empire (1914–1916); Armenian paramilitaries (1917–1918); Special Striking Division (1918–1919)
- Service years: 1888–1907 (fedayi); 1912–1913 (Bulgaria); 1914–1916 (WWI); 1917–1919 (Special Striking Division)
- Rank: Commander of the fedayi (1899–1904); First lieutenant (Bulgaria); Major-general (Russia) (Note: Andranik was given the rank of a major-general by the command of the Caucasus Front, a formation of the army of the dissolved Russian Republic.); Commander of the Western Armenian division of the Armenian Army Corps (1918); Commander of the Special Striking Division (1919)
- Nickname: Andranik pasha
- Conflicts: See list: Armenian national movement; Battle of Holy Apostles Monastery; Sasun uprising; First Balkan War; Bulgarian front; Battle of Merhamli; World War I; Persian campaign; Battle of Dilman; Urmia clashes; Battle of Khoy; Caucasus campaign; Battle of Bitlis; Capture of Erzurum; Armenian–Azerbaijani War; Fight for Karabakh
- Awards: see below

Signature
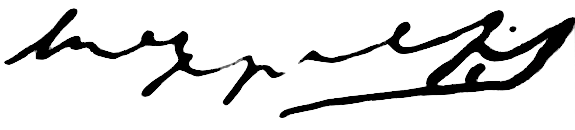

Andranik Ozanian, (Note: In classical orthography his name is spelled Անդրանիկ Օզանեան and pronounced [ɑntʰɾɑniɡ ɔzɑnjɑn] in Western Armenian. In reformed orthography his name is spelled Անդրանիկ Օզանյան and pronounced [ɑndɾɑnik ɔzɑnjɑn] in Eastern Armenian.) commonly known as General Andranik (Note: Զօրավար Անդրանիկ in classical spelling, Զորավար Անդրանիկ in reformed, Zoravar Andranik.) or simply Andranik (Note: Armenian: Անդրանիկ. Also spelled Antranik or Antranig) (25 February 1865 – 31 August 1927), (Note: Some sources mistakenly indicate 1866 as Andranik's date of birth. 1866 is also engraved on his grave in the Père Lachaise Cemetery. Some sources also erroneously indicate 1928 as his date of death, perhaps because Andranik's body was moved to France and reburied there in 1928.) was an Armenian military commander and statesman. He was a leader in the Armenian national liberation movement and widely regarded as the preeminent fedayi.

Andranik joined the Armenian Revolutionary Federation (Dashnaktsutyun) party and, along with other fedayi, sought to defend the Armenian peasantry living in their ancestral homeland, an area known as Western (or Turkish) Armenia—at the time part of the Ottoman Empire. He fled the empire after Ottoman forces suppressed the 1904 Sasun uprising. Three years later, he quit the Dashnaktsutyun over its brief political alliance with the Young Turks—the movement that later carried out the Armenian genocide. When the First Balkan War broke out in 1912, he and Garegin Nzhdeh formed an Armenian volunteer unit inside the Bulgarian army to fight Ottoman troops.

During World War I, Andranik took command of the 1st Armenian Volunteer Battalion in the Russian Imperial Army. He took part in the capture of Van, but the Russian Revolution of 1917 and subsequent troop withdrawal left Armenian forces unsupported. Andranik led a desperate defense of Erzurum in early 1918, but retreated due to shortages and the threat of encirclement. As the retreating Armenian defenders withdrew toward the Caucasus, pursuing Ottoman forces advanced into Eastern Armenia, where their progress was ultimately halted by Armenian regulars, militia, and civilians at the Battle of Sardarabad. Despite the victory, Andranik broke ties with the Armenian National Council and refused to recognize the First Republic of Armenia or the Treaty of Batum, viewing the new state’s borders as a surrender of Western Armenia. Andranik, independently from the Republic of Armenia, fought in Zangezur against the Azerbaijani and Turkish armies, and helped to keep it under local control.

Andranik left Armenia in 1919 due to disagreements with the government, spending his remaining years organizing relief for Armenian refugees in Europe and the United States. He settled in Fresno, California, in 1922, where he died in 1927. Andranik is regarded as a national hero among Armenians. Statues of him stand in several countries, and numerous streets, public squares, poems, and songs bear his name.

== Early life ==
Andranik Ozanian was born on 25 February 1865 in Shabin-Karahisar, in the Sivas Vilayet of the Ottoman Empire, to Mariam and Toros Ozanian. Andranik is an Armenian name meaning "first-born child". His paternal ancestors moved to Shabin-Karahisar from the nearby village of Ozan (now Ozanlı) in the early 18th century to avoid persecution, adopting the surname Ozanian after their home village. After his mother died when he was a year old, his elder sister Nazeli raised him. He attended the local Musheghian School from 1875 to 1882, then worked in his father's carpentry shop. At age 17, he married; his wife died a year later during childbirth, and their infant son died shortly after.

The plight of Armenians in the Ottoman Empire worsened under Sultan Abdul Hamid II. In 1882, Andranik was arrested after assaulting a Turkish gendarme for abusing local Armenians, but escaped with help from friends. He lived in Constantinople between 1884 and 1886, working as a carpenter. He turned to revolutionary activity in Sivas Province in 1888 and joined the Hunchak Party in 1891. On 9 February 1892, he took part in the assassination of Constantinople's police chief, Yusuf Mehmed Bey, a figure known for his anti-Armenianism. Arrested once more, Andranik escaped prison a second time and joined the newly formed Armenian Revolutionary Federation (Dashnaktsutyun) later that year. During the 1894–1896 Hamidian massacres, which claimed between 80,000 and 300,000 lives, he and fellow fedayi defended Armenian villages in Mush and Sasun against Ottoman troops and Kurdish Hamidiye cavalry.

In 1897, Andranik traveled to Tiflis, the administrative center of the Caucasus and home to the ARF leadership. He returned to Western Armenia "entrusted with extensive powers, and with a large supply of arms" for local fedayi. Joined by several dozen Russian Armenians, he headed to the Mush–Sasun region to link up with Aghbiur Serob. Serob's forces had already expelled local Ottoman officials, establishing semi-autonomous Armenian enclaves in the area.

== Leader of the fedayi ==
In 1899, Kurdish chieftain Bushare Khalil Bey killed Aghbiur Serob, the primary fedayi leader in the region. Months later, Bey's forces raided the Sasun village of Talvorik, killing a priest, two men, and twenty-five women and children. Following Serob’s death, Andranik took command of the irregular units in Mush and Sasun, an area inhabited by a “warlike semi-independent Armenian peasantry.” He tracked down and killed Bey in retaliation; according to contemporary accounts, he beheaded the chieftain and took the Ottoman medal Sultan Abdul Hamid II had awarded Bey. This execution consolidated Andranik's leadership among local fedayi groups.

Small fedayi bands continued their skirmishes with Ottoman forces and Kurdish militias as conditions in Western Armenia declined. Under Article 61 of the 1878 Treaty of Berlin, the Ottoman government was obligated to implement reforms and protect Armenians against attacks by Circassians and Kurds. The Great Powers did not enforce the provision. According to Christopher J. Walker, the attention of the European powers was on Macedonia, while Russia was "in no mood for reactivating the Armenian question.”

=== Battle of Holy Apostles Monastery ===
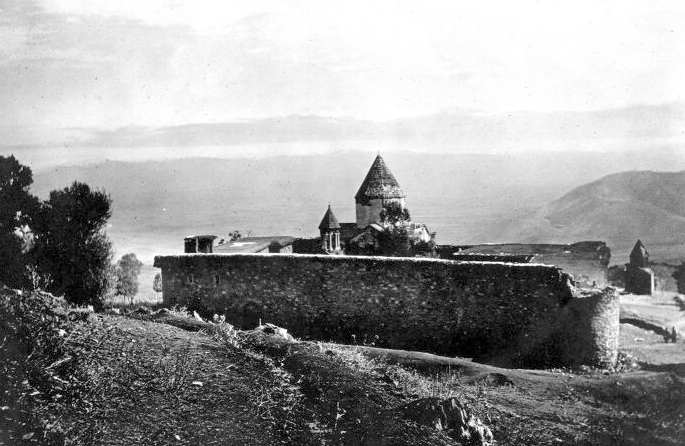
The Holy Apostles Monastery of Mush

In November 1901, the fedayi had an engagement with Ottoman forces in the Battle of Holy Apostles Monastery, which would come to be one of the best-known episodes of Andranik's revolutionary activities. In an attempt by the Ottoman government to suppress his activities, a force of over 5,000 soldiers was dispatched to capture him and his band. By early November, a regiment of approximately 1,200 men under the command of Ferikh Pasha and Ali Pasha had tracked and encircled Andranik and around 50 of his men within the fortified walls of the Arakelots Monastery near Mush. Faced with the monastery's defense by the soldiers, the Turkish generals initiated negotiations, demanding the surrender of the fedayi.

After weeks of resistance and negotiations—in which Armenian clergy and the headman of Mush and foreign consuls took part—Andranik and his companions left the monastery and fled in small groups. According to Leon Trotsky, Andranik—dressed in the uniform of a Turkish officer—"went the rounds of the entire guard, talking to them in excellent Turkish," and "at the same time showing the way out to his own men." After breaking through the siege of the monastery, Andranik gained legendary stature among provincial Armenians. He became so popular that the men he led came to refer to him always by his first name. Andranik intended to attract the attention of the foreign consuls at Mush to the plight of the Armenian peasants and to provide hope for the oppressed Armenians of the eastern provinces. According to Trotsky, Andranik's "political thinking took shape in a setting of Carbonarist activity and diplomatic intrigue."

=== 1904 Sasun uprising and exodus ===
A 1904 map of the Sasun region, where most of the fighting was concentrated

In 1903, Andranik demanded that the Ottoman government stop harassing Armenians and implement reforms in the Armenian provinces. Most fedayi were concentrated in the mountainous region of Sasun, an area of about 12,000 km^{2} (4,600 sq mi) with an overwhelming Armenian majority—1,769 Armenian households to 155 Kurdish ones—which served as their main operational area. The region was in "a state of revolutionary turmoil" because the local Armenians had refused to pay taxes for the previous seven years.

To coordinate the defense of these villages against Ottoman and Kurdish incursions, Andranik and several dozen fedayi, including leaders such as Hrayr Dzhoghk and Sebouh Nersesian, held a meeting at the village of Gelieguzan. Andranik suggested a widespread uprising of the Armenians of Taron and Vaspurakan; Hrayr opposed his view and suggested a small, local uprising in Sasun, because the Armenian irregulars lacked resources. Hrayr's suggestion was eventually approved by the council and Andranik was chosen as the main commander of the uprising.

The first clashes commenced in January 1904 with skirmishes between the fedayi and state-supported Kurdish irregulars. In early April, the Ottoman government deployed an estimated 10,000 to 20,000 soldiers and 7,000 Kurdish irregulars against 100 to 200 fedayi and 700 to 1,000 local Armenian men. Hrayr was killed during the intense fighting, while Andranik survived and continued the resistance. After weeks of fighting and artillery bombardment of Armenian villages, the outnumbered Armenian forces were overwhelmed and the uprising was suppressed by May 1904. Between 7,000 and 10,000 Armenian civilians were killed during the two-month uprising, about 9,000 were left homeless, and around 4,000 villagers were forced into exile.

According to Christopher J. Walker, the fedayi came “near to organising an uprising and shaking Ottoman power in Armenia”, but “even then it was unthinkable that the empire would lose any of her territory, since the idea of intervention was far from Russia.” Trotsky noted that the conflict went largely ignored by the Great Powers, whose attention was then fixed on the Russo-Japanese War. In a final tactical retreat in late 1904, Andranik and his surviving men reached Lake Van, crossing to Aghtamar Island before escaping to Persia via Van. According to Trotsky, this exodus was an effort to prevent further reprisal killings of civilians, whereas Tsatur Aghayan viewed it as a strategic move to “gather new resources” for the next phase of the struggle. According to Walker, the failed uprising left behind "little more than a heroic memory."

== Immigration and conflict with the ARF ==
Following Andranik's departure from Persia, he traveled to the Caucasus, where he discussed with Armenian leadership in Baku and Tiflis. Subsequently, he left Russia for Europe, dedicating himself to international advocacy for the Armenian national liberation struggle. In 1906, during his stay in Geneva, he published a book on military tactics mainly based on his experiences during the 1904 Sasun uprising.

In early 1907, Andranik traveled to Vienna to attend the fourth Congress of the Armenian Revolutionary Federation (ARF). Since 1902, the ARF had been engaged in collaborations with Turkish émigré political circles in Europe. During the Vienna Congress, the party formally approved negotiations with the Young Turks—the faction that would later orchestrate the Armenian genocide, in hopes to construct a joint struggle to depose Abdul Hamid. Andranik strongly denounced this cooperation and left the party.

Following the Young Turk Revolution in 1908, the ARF attempted to reconcile with Andranik, inviting him to Constantinople and stand for election to the Ottoman parliament. He rejected the offer, reportedly stating, "I don't want to sit there and do nothing". Dissatisfied, Andranik distanced himself from active political and military affairs for several years.

=== First Balkan War ===
In 1907, Andranik settled in Sofia, where he established ties with the leadership of the Internal Macedonian Revolutionary Organization, including the revolutionary Boris Sarafov, and pledged to work jointly for the oppressed Armenian and Macedonian peoples. During the First Balkan War (1912–1913), Andranik led a company of 230 Armenian volunteers as part of the Macedonian-Adrianopolitan Volunteer Corps, serving under Aleksandar Protogerov within the Bulgarian army, against the Ottoman army. He shared command of the unit with Garegin Nzhdeh. While Andranik and his Armenian soldiers fought for the Bulgarians, they were simultaneously pitted against an estimated 8,000 Armenians serving on the opposing side, within the Ottoman army.

Andranik, commissioned as a first lieutenant by the Bulgarian government, distinguished himself in several engagements. Most notably, during the Battle of Merhamli, his unit played a vital role in the capture of the Turkish commander Yaver Pasha. For his conduct during the conflict, he was awarded the Order of Bravery by General Protogerov in 1913.

Despite this, Andranik, much like Nzhdeh and the rest of the Armenians under their command, opposed Bulgaria's policies which led to the Second Balkan War. During that war, Andranik viewed the conflict between Bulgaria and its former Serbian and Greek allies as a departure from the First Balkan War's original purpose. He disbanded his company in May 1913 and withdrew from active duty due to an aggravation of his illness. The Armenian soldiers serving under Andranik and Nzhdeh, along with Armenian civilians in Bulgaria, later found out that Tsar Ferdinand had banned Armenian newspapers in Bulgaria because they had criticized Bulgarian policy. Soon after, Andranik "retired to a village near Varna, and lived as a farmer until August 1914".

== World War I ==
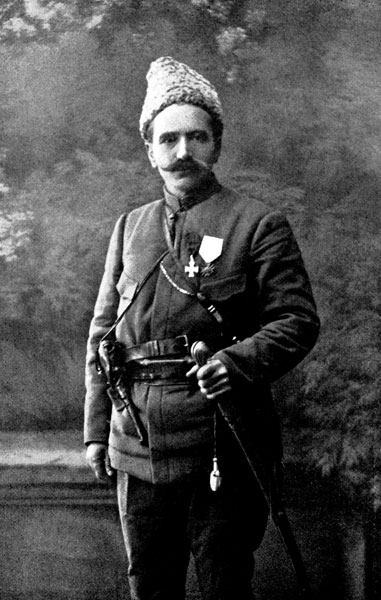
Andranik as commander of the 1st Armenian Volunteer Battalion

Following the start of World War I in 1914, Andranik returned to Russia from retirement in Bulgaria. The Russian military gave him command of the 1st Armenian Volunteer Battalion within the Imperial Russian Army. He led the 1,200-man unit in the Caucasus Campaign from November 1914 to August 1915. At the Battle of Dilman in April 1915, his battalion fought alongside Russian troops under General Tovmas Nazarbekian, stopping an Ottoman advance into the Caucasus through Iranian Azerbaijan.

While fighting continued on the front, Ottoman authorities carried out the Armenian genocide across the empire. The genocide resulted in the destruction of the Armenian population in Western Armenia, with an estimated 1.5 million killed and survivors forced into exile. In the spring of 1915, Armenians in Van held out against a month-long Ottoman siege under Aram Manukian until Armenian volunteer battalions arrived and forced the Ottoman troops to retreat. Andranik entered Van on 19 May 1915, and subsequently helped Russian forces take Shatakh, Moks, and Tatvan on the southern shore of Lake Van. After the volunteer units disintegrated during the summer of 1915, Andranik traveled to Tiflis to recruit additional volunteers, resuming combat from November 1915 to March 1916 and supporting the Russian capture of Mush in February 1916. Lieutenant General Theodore G. Chernozubov credited the successes of the Russian army in several engagements to the first Armenian battalion, praising Andranik as a "brave and experienced chief" who enjoyed great prestige among the volunteers.

In 1916, Russian policy toward Western Armenia changed. As the Imperial Army secured the region, the government sought to annex the territory and potentially resettle it with Cossacks and Russian peasants. Imperial authorities ordered the demobilization of Armenian volunteer units and prohibited Armenian civic organizations. Historian Richard Hovannisian wrote that because "Russian armies were in firm control of most of the Armenian plateau by the summer of 1916, there was no longer any need to expend niceties upon the Armenians." Disappointed by Russian policy, Andranik resigned his command and left the front in July 1916.

=== Russian Revolution and Turkish reoccupation ===
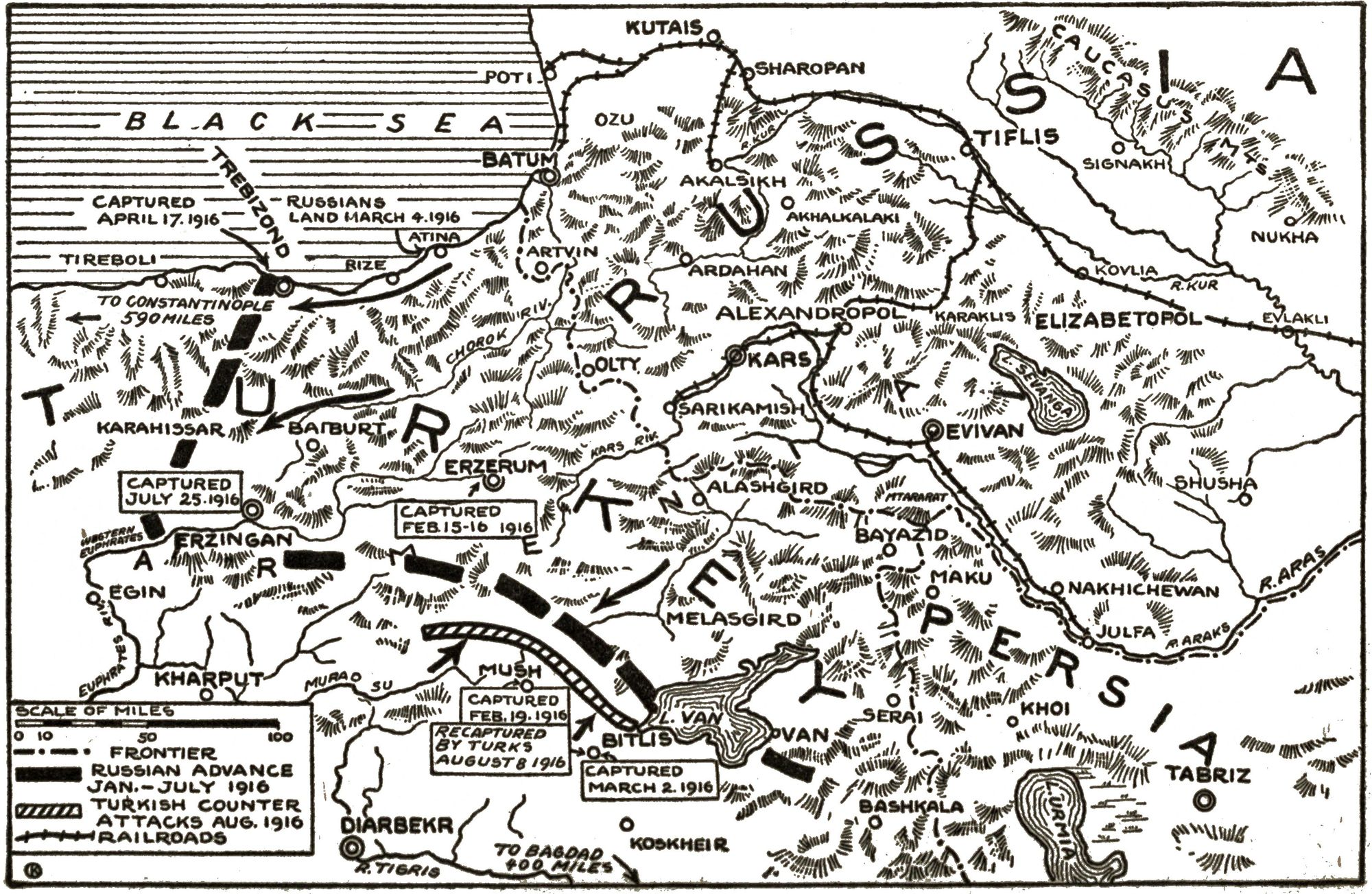
The extent of the Russian occupation of Western Armenia during World War I in 1916

The February Revolution of 1917 brought an end to Romanov rule and led the Russian Provisional Government to create the Special Transcaucasian Committee to administer the South Caucasus. That same year in Tiflis, Andranik and editor Vahan Totovents launched the nonpartisan newspaper Hayastan (Armenia). He also organized relief efforts for refugees across the South Caucasus. In May 1917, the Provisional Government established a civilian administration in Western Armenia, but Russian military authority dissolved as soldiers deserted the front lines following the revolution.

The situation had a significant shift following the October Revolution. The Armistice of Erzincan, signed on 5 December 1917, officially ended hostilities between Bolshevik Russia and the Ottoman Empire, accelerating the Russian military withdrawal. Although the Soviet government recognized the Armenian right to self-determination in January the next year, the signing of the Treaty of Brest-Litovsk on 3 March 1918 reversed this stance. Under the treaty, Russia formally ceded Western Armenia to the Ottoman Empire to consolidate its resources for the Russian Civil War.

In December 1917, the Transcaucasian Commissariat authorized the formation of an Armenian Army Corps. Under the command of Nazarbekian, the Corps was positioned along the front line from Van to Erzincan, with Andranik commanding the Western Armenian division. In January 1918, the Caucasus Front command promoted Andranik to major-general. Hovannisian noted the severe manpower shortage, writing that only "several thousand men now defended a 300-mile front formerly secured by a half million Russian regulars." Following an unsuccessful defense of Erzurum, outnumbered Armenian forces evacuated the city on 12 March 1918.

The advancing Ottoman army overran the temporary Armenian administration in Western Armenia during its spring 1918 offensive. After the fall of Erzurum, Andranik retreated through Kars, Alexandropol, and Jalaloghli, reaching Dsegh by 18 May. Ottoman troops had reached the pre-war border of Russian Armenia by early April. Stationed in Dsegh, Andranik and his unit were unable to take part in the May battles of Sardarabad, Abaran, and Karakilisa.

== First Republic of Armenia ==
After Ottoman forces were defeated at Sardarabad, the Armenian National Council declared the independence of Russian Armenia on 28 May 1918. Andranik condemned this move, denounced the Dashnaktsutyun, and favored maintaining alignment with Bolshevik Russia instead. Rejecting the Republic of Armenia as "a pawn in the grip of [Ottoman] Turkey", he condemned the Treaty of Batum—which accepted severe territorial limits—as an act of treason. Historian Christopher Walker notes that many Western Armenians saw the new republic as "only a dusty province without Turkish Armenia whose salvation Armenians had been seeking for 40 years."

In early June 1918, Andranik departed Dilijan with thousands of refugees, traveling through Sevan, Nor Bayazet, and Vayots Dzor before reaching Nakhichevan on 17 June. He attempted to push south toward Khoy, Iran, to assist refugees from Van and link up with British forces in northern Iran, but encountering large Ottoman forces forced him to retreat to Nakhichevan. On 14 July 1918, he declared Nakhichevan an integral territory of Soviet Russia—a declaration endorsed by Vladimir Lenin and Armenian Bolshevik leader Stepan Shahumyan.

=== Zangezur ===
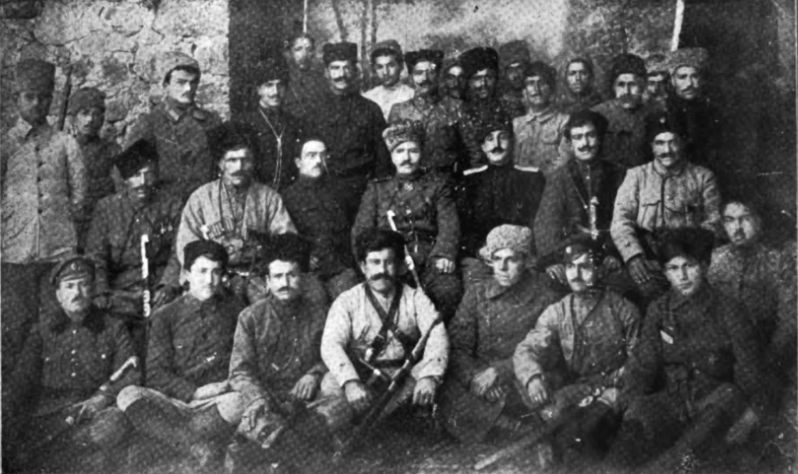
Andranik with the commanders of the Special Striking Division in Zangezur, 1918

When Ottoman troops advanced on Nakhichevan, Andranik moved his Special Striking Division into the mountainous Zangezur region to establish defensive positions. Interethnic conflict between local Armenians and Azerbaijanis had intensified sharply by mid-1918. Arriving with 3,000 to 5,000 fighters and roughly 30,000 refugees, Andranik secured military and administrative control over Zangezur by September. The territory formed a vital strategic corridor linking Turkey and Azerbaijan; under his command, it turned into the principal stronghold of Armenian armed resistance after the Treaty of Batum.

Muslim villages along key transit routes initially isolated Andranik's forces inside Zangezur. Historian Donald Bloxham states that Andranik engaged in ethnic cleansing, destroying Muslim villages to alter the region's demographics and create a homogeneous Armenian territory. By late 1918, Azerbaijan formally accused his forces of massacring Azerbaijani peasants and requested their immediate withdrawal. Conversely, biographer Antranig Chalabian argues that Andranik's military presence protected Zangezur's 60,000 Armenian residents from destruction by Turco-Tatar forces.

Andranik's actions drew a formal condemnation from the Ottoman General Halil Pasha, who threatened the Armenian government with military retaliation. In response, Prime Minister Hovhannes Katchaznouni stated that the central government was not affiliated with and had no authority over Andranik or his forces.

=== Karabakh ===
The signing of the Armistice of Mudros on 30 October 1918 triggered an Ottoman withdrawal from the South Caucasus. By late October, Andranik concentrated his Special Striking Division on the border of Zangezur and Karabakh. Seeking local endorsement before advancing, he consulted Karabakh Armenian leaders, who asked him to delay his offensive by ten days to allow negotiations with the region's Muslim inhabitants. Historian Richard Hovannisian writes that this delay "proved crucial" to the campaign's outcome. When Andranik launched his offensive in late November, his troops overcame Kurdish resistance at Abdallyar (Lachin) and advanced toward Shusha, the administrative center of Karabakh.

By early December, Andranik had advanced within 40 km (25 miles) of Shusha when General W. M. Thomson, the British commander in Baku, ordered him to halt. Thomson requested an immediate withdrawal, stating that post-armistice hostilities would harm the Armenian cause at the upcoming Paris Peace Conference. Trusting British diplomatic assurances, Andranik halted the advance and returned to Zangezur.

The Armenian Karabakh Council assumed regional administration but quickly clashed with British authority. Upon arriving in December, Thomson ordered the council to limit its work to "local, nonpolitical matters," provoking widespread opposition from the Armenian population. Thomson then named Khosrov bey Sultanov, an "ardent pan-Turkist," governor of Karabakh and Zangezur. Historian Christopher J. Walker writes that Karabakh remained part of Azerbaijan throughout the Soviet era primarily because "Andranik's trust of the word of a British officer" led him to abandon the campaign.

=== Departure ===
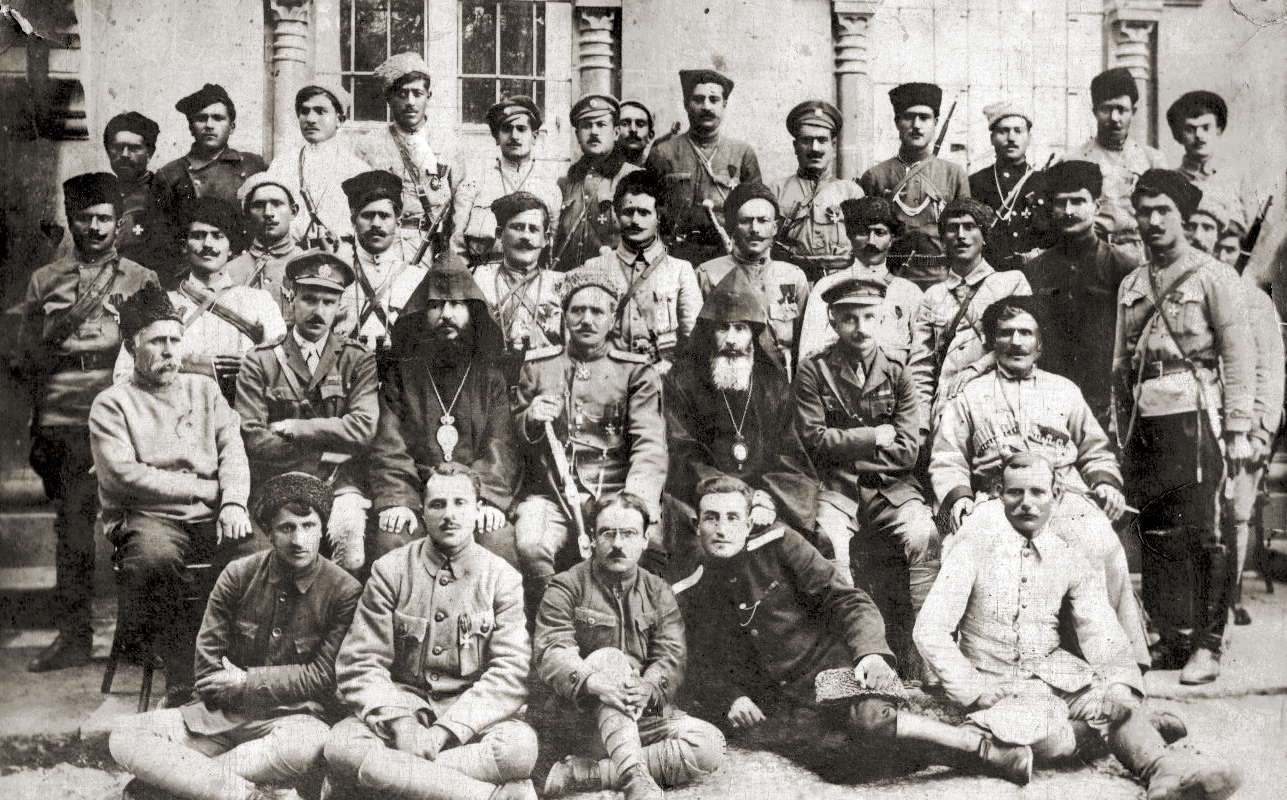
Andranik with his men and two archbishops in Etchmiadzin Cathedral just before leaving Armenia, April 1919

Heavy snowfalls isolated Zangezur from Karabakh and Yerevan during the winter of 1918–1919, while the influx of refugees worsened famine, epidemic conditions, and inflation across the district. After withdrawing from Karabakh to Goris in December 1918, Andranik agreed to British officers' suggestions that his units stay in Zangezur for the winter. On 23 December, a conference of local Armenian leaders concluded that Zangezur could not support the refugee population until spring. They proposed repatriating more than 15,000 refugees to Nakhichevan, which Ottoman troops had recently evacuated. Major W. D. Gibbon arrived with limited supplies and funds donated by Armenians in Baku, but the aid was insufficient to support the refugees.

By late February 1919, Andranik was ready to leave Zangezur. Rejecting Gibbon's suggestion that he and his soldiers depart via the Baku–Tiflis railway at Yevlakh station, Andranik left Goris on 22 March 1919 and marched across Sisian through deep snowdrifts to Daralagyaz and the Ararat plain with his irregulars. After a three-week march, his men and horses reached the railway station at Davalu, where Drastamat Kanayan and Assistant Minister of Internal Affairs Sargis Manasyan met him. Andranik rejected their invitation to visit Yerevan, maintaining that the Dashnak government had betrayed the Armenians and was responsible for the loss of Western Armenia. His departure left Zangezur more vulnerable to Azerbaijani threats, prompting local Armenian forces to request reinforcements from Yerevan.

Andranik reached Etchmiadzin, the seat of the Catholicos of All Armenians, on 13 April 1919. His 5,000-strong division had dwindled to 1,350 soldiers. Unable to reconcile his differences with the British military command and the Republic's government, Andranik disbanded his unit and formally surrendered its weapons and equipment to Catholicos George V. Accompanied by fifteen officers, he departed Etchmiadzin by train for Tiflis on 27 April, drawing crowds at stops along the line. In Tiflis, he discussed the recent Armeno-Georgian War with Georgian Foreign Minister Evgeni Gegechkori, using poet Hovhannes Tumanyan as an interpreter. This trip was his final departure from Armenia.

== Last years ==
Between 1919 and 1922, Andranik traveled across Europe and the United States to lobby for Armenian refugees. Visiting Paris and London, he urged Allied leaders to occupy Western Armenia. French President Raymond Poincaré appointed him an Officer of the Legion of Honor during his 1919 visit to Paris. Late that year, Andranik led a delegation to the United States alongside General Yakov Bagratuni and Hovhannes Kajaznuni to rally political support for an American mandate over Armenia and secure funding for the Armenian military. In Fresno, California, he led a fundraising drive that collected US$500,000 for refugee relief.

Upon returning to Europe, Andranik married Nevarte Kurkjian in Paris on 15 May 1922, with Boghos Nubar serving as best man. Later that year, the couple moved to the United States and settled in Fresno. In his 1936 short story "Antranik of Armenia," Armenian–American writer William Saroyan recalled Andranik's arrival at the Southern Pacific depot, noting that "it looked as if all Armenians of California were at the station that day." Saroyan described him as "a man of about fifty in a neat Armenian suit of clothes... a little under six feet tall, very solid and very strong," with a white mustache and a facial expression "both ferocious and kind." In Fresno, Andranik stayed for several months with the family of future economist Armen Alchian. Khachik Dashtents depicted this period in his 1979 novel Call of the Plowmen («Ռանչպարների կանչը»), portraying Andranik—under the name Shapinand—spending his free time crafting small wooden chairs.

== Death ==
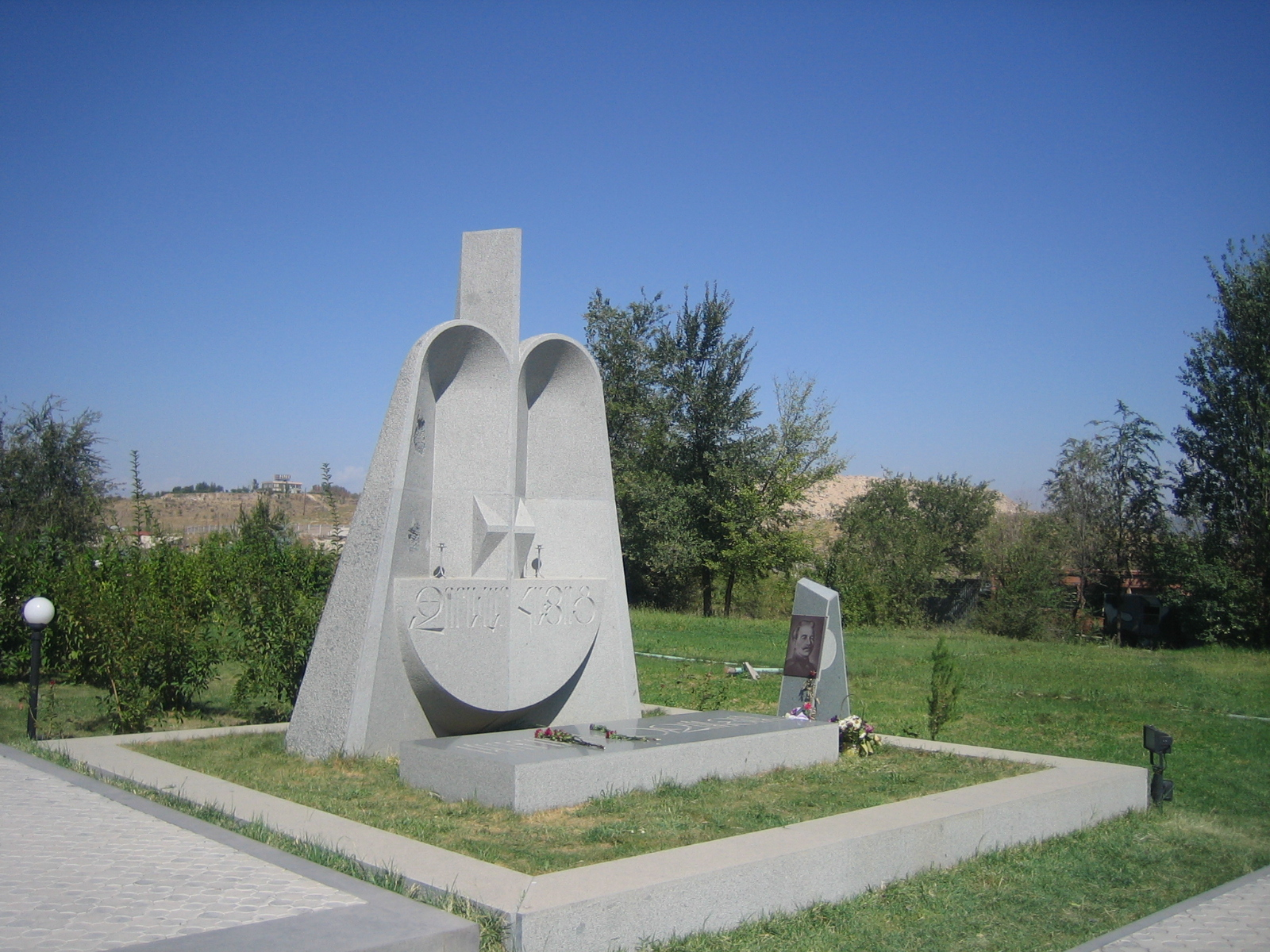
Andranik's grave at Yerablur cemetery

Hoping to improve his failing health, Andranik moved from Fresno to San Francisco in February 1926. He died from angina on 31 August 1927 at Richardson Springs, California, according to Butte County, California public records. Thousands gathered on 7 September for his funeral service at Holy Trinity Church, after which the procession moved to Ararat Cemetery. Next month, on 9 October, more than 2,500 Armenians attended a memorial service held in his honor at Carnegie Hall in New York City.

After his first funeral, it was planned to take Andranik's remains to Armenia for final burial; however, when they arrived in France, the Soviet authorities refused permission to allow his remains to enter Soviet Armenia. Instead, they remained in France and, after a second funeral service held in the Armenian Church of Paris, were buried in Père Lachaise Cemetery in Paris on 29 January 1928.

In 2000, the Armenian and French governments arranged to transfer Andranik's remains from Paris to Yerevan, an initiative launched by Armenian Prime Minister Vazgen Sargsyan. Following their arrival on 17 February, his remains lay in state at the Karen Demirchyan Sport and Concert Complex before being moved to Etchmiadzin Cathedral, where Karekin II conducted a funeral service. On 20 February 2000, Andranik was re-interred at the Yerablur military pantheon beside Sargsyan. Speaking at the ceremony, President Robert Kocharyan called Andranik "one of the greatest sons of the Armenian nation." The reburial was attended by Prime Minister Aram Sargsyan, Foreign Minister Vartan Oskanian, and 102-year-old veteran Grigor Ghazarian, who had served under Andranik. A monument erected over his grave bears the inscription Zoravar Hayots ("General of the Armenians").

== Legacy and recognition ==
=== Public image ===
"General Andranik, the great Armenian leader, who is our national hero [...] For many years General Andranik kept alive the courage of all Armenians. He promised them freedom and constantly endangered his life to keep up the spirits of my people."

— Aurora Mardiganian, Ravished Armenia (1918)

Andranik was considered a hero during his lifetime. The Literary Digest described Andranik in 1920 as "the Armenian's Robin Hood, Garibaldi, and Washington, all in one." The Independent wrote that he is "worshipped by his countrymen for his heroic fighting in their defense against the Turks." Andranik was praised by Armenian writer Hovhannes Tumanyan, while Armenian Bolshevik Anastas Mikoyan once wrote that "the name of Andranik was surrounded by an aura of glory." Historian Gerard Libaridian described Andranik as the "most famous of the Armenian guerrilla fighters, although not necessarily the most important. He represented the emerging new image of the Armenian who could fight."

During the Soviet era, Andranik's legacy and those of other Armenian national heroes were diminished and "any reference to them would be dangerous since they represented the strive for independence." However, during the Khrushchev thaw, Soviet Armenian authorities began a limited "rehabilitation" of Andranik. The initiative was supported by Mikoyan and Marshal Ivan Bagramyan, both of whom had served under Andranik's command at one point. In 1963, Soviet Armenian poet Paruyr Sevak wrote an essay about Andranik after reading one of his soldier's notes. Sevak wrote that his generation knew "little about Andranik, almost nothing." He continued, "knowing nothing about Andranik means to know nothing about modern Armenian history."

In 1965, Soviet Armenia marked the centenary of Andranik's birth. Soviet historians highlighted his break with the ARF and his pledge of allegiance to Stepan Shaumian's Baku Commune. However, his official rehabilitation faced opposition in Soviet Azerbaijan, where critics accused him of ethnic cleansing against Azerbaijani civilians during the 1918–1919 conflicts in Transcaucasia. Marshal Ivan Bagramyan defended Andranik against these claims, arguing that Azerbaijani nationalists had "misled the Azerbaijani public." Consequently, as historian Arsène Saparov notes, Andranik occupied an ambiguous place in late Soviet memory: "it was no longer taboo to mention him but neither was he officially celebrated."

Today, Andranik is considered a national hero among Armenians worldwide. He is also seen as a legendary figure in Armenian culture. In a series of polls in Armenia from 2006 to 2008, Andranik consistently placed second after Vazgen Sargsyan in the list of Armenian national heroes and leaders.

Andranik's activities have also attracted occasional criticism. He has generally been seen as a pro-Russian and pro-Soviet figure; prompting the scholar-turned-political activist Rafael Ishkhanyan to criticize him for constant reliance on Russia. Ishkhanyan characterized Andranik and Hakob Zavriev as leaders of the stream within Armenian political thought unconditionally reliant on Russia. He contrasted them with Aram Manukian and his self-reliant stance. Ruben Angaladyan voiced his opposition to the erection of a statue of Andranik in Yerevan, arguing that he does not deserve one in the national capital because he did not contribute substantially to the First Republic and ultimately left Armenia. While Angaladyan acknowledges Andranik as a popular hero, he considers it inappropriate to call him a national hero.

=== Memorials ===
Statues and memorials of Andranik have been erected around the world, including in Bucharest, Romania (1936), Père Lachaise Cemetery in Paris (1945), Melkonian Educational Institute, Nicosia, Cyprus (1990), Le Plessis-Robinson, Paris (2005), Varna, Bulgaria (2011), and Armavir, Russia. A memorial exists in Richardson Springs, California, where Andranik died. In May 2011, a statue of Andranik was erected in Volonka village near Sochi, Russia; however, it was removed the same day, apparently under pressure from Turkey, which earlier announced that they would boycott the 2014 Sochi Winter Olympics if the statue remained standing.

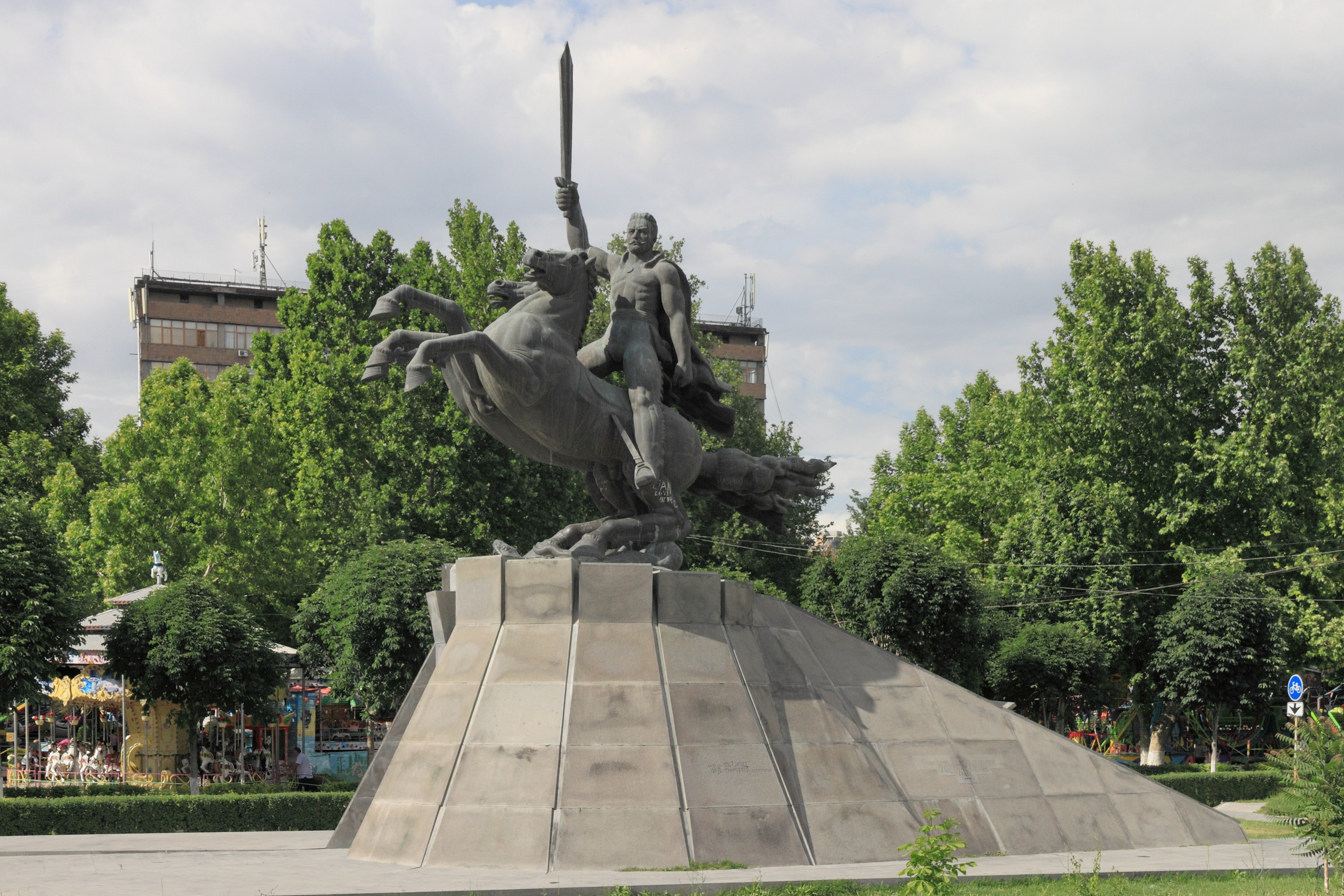
An equestrian statue of Andranik near the Saint Gregory Cathedral in central Yerevan

The first statue of Andranik in Armenia was erected in 1967 in the village of Ujan. Another early statue in Armenia was erected in Voskehask, near Gyumri, in 1969. More statues have been erected after Armenia's independence from the Soviet Union in 1991; three of which can be found in the Armenian capital of Yerevan—in Malatia-Sebastia district (2000); near the St. Gregory Cathedral (by Ara Shiraz, 2002); and outside the Fedayi Movement Museum (2006). Elsewhere in Armenia, Andranik's statues stand in Voskevan and Navur villages of Tavush, in Gyumri's Victory Park (1994), Arteni, and Angeghakot, among other places.

Numerous streets and squares both inside and outside Armenia, including in Córdoba, Argentina, Plovdiv and Varna in Bulgaria, Meudon, Paris and a section of Connecticut Route 314 state highway running entirely within Wethersfield, Connecticut are named after Andranik. General Andranik Station of the Yerevan Metro was opened in 1989 as Hoktemberyan Station and was renamed for Andranik in 1992. In 1995, General Andranik's Museum was founded in Komitas Park of Yerevan, but was soon closed because the building was privatized. It was reopened on 16 September 2006, by Ilyich Beglarian as the Museum of Armenian Fedayi Movement, named after Andranik.

According to Patrick Wilson, during the First Nagorno-Karabakh War Andranik "inspired a new generation of Armenians." A volunteer regiment from Masis named "General Andranik" operated in Armenia and Nagorno-Karabakh during the conflict.

Many organizations and groups in the Armenian diaspora are named after Andranik. On 11 September 2012, during the Bulgaria vs. Armenia football match in Sofia's Levski National Stadium, Armenian fans brought a giant poster with pictures of General Andranik and Armenian officer Gurgen Margaryan, who was murdered in 2004 by Azerbaijani lieutenant Ramil Safarov. The text on the poster read, "Andranik's children are also heroes ... The work will be done." In the Armenian Youth Federation Eastern Region, the Granite City chapter is named "Antranig" in Andranik's honor.

The 65 page manuscripts of General Andranik, the only known memoir written by him, were returned to Armenia in May 2014 and sent to the History Museum of Armenia through Culture Minister Hasmik Poghosyan, almost a century after Andranik had parted with them.

=== In culture ===
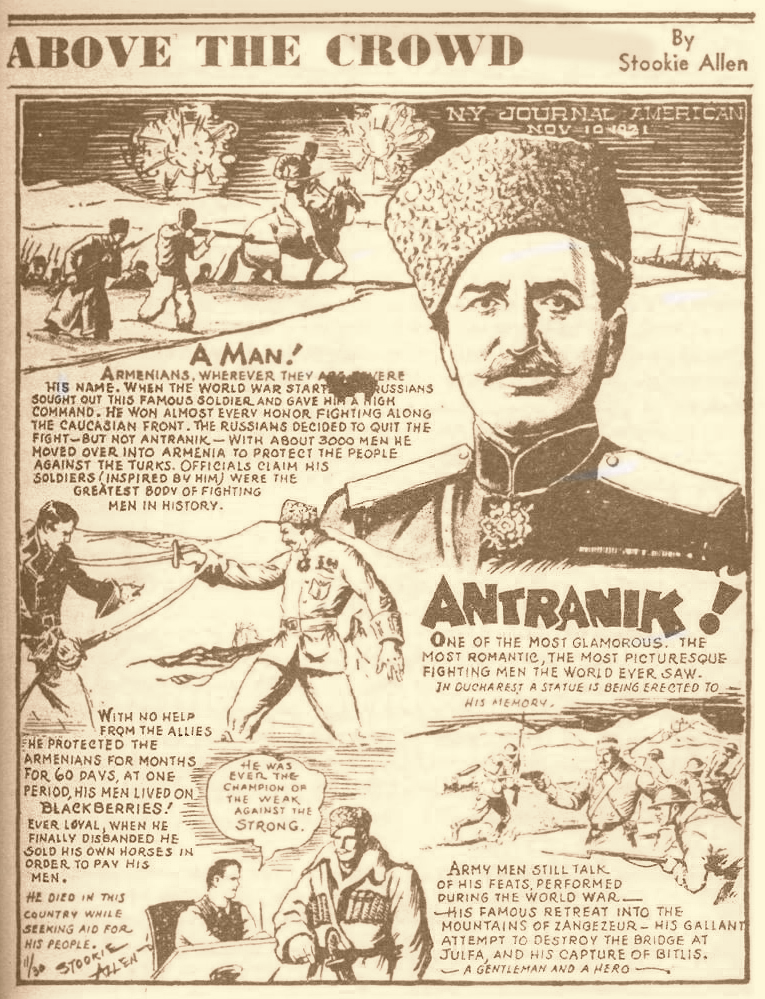
A comic by Stookie Allen depicting Andranik, New York Journal-American, 1920

Andranik has been figured prominently in the Armenian literature, sometimes as a fictional character. The Western Armenian writer Siamanto wrote a poem entitled "Andranik", which was published in Geneva in 1905. The first book about Andranik was published during his lifetime. In 1920, Vahan Totovents, under the pen name Arsen Marmarian, published the book Gen. Andranik and His Wars (Զոր. Անդրանիկ և իր պատերազմները) in Entente-occupied Constantinople. The famed Armenian-American writer William Saroyan wrote a short story titled Antranik of Armenia, which was included in his collection of short stories Inhale and Exhale (1936). Another US-based Armenian writer Hamastegh's novel The White Horseman (Սպիտակ Ձիավորը, 1952) was based on Andranik and other fedayi. Hovhannes Shiraz, one of the most prominent Armenian poets of the 20th century, wrote at least two poems about Andranik; one in 1963 and another in 1967. The latter one, titled Statue to Andranik (Արձան Անդրանիկին), was published in 1991 after Shiraz's death. Sero Khanzadyan's novel Andranik was suppressed for years and was published in 1989 when the tight Soviet control over publications was relaxed. Between the 1960s and the 1980s, author Suren Sahakyan collected folk stories and completed a novel, "Story about Andranik" (Ասք Անդրանիկի մասին). It was first published in Yerevan in 2008.

Andranik's name has been memorialized in numerous songs. In 1913, Leon Trotsky described Andranik as "a hero of song and legend." Italian diplomat and historian Luigi Villari wrote in 1906 that he met a priest from Turkish Armenia in Erivan who "sang the war-song of Antranik, the leader of Armenian revolutionary bands in Turkey." Andranik is one of the main figures featured in Armenian patriotic songs, performed by Nersik Ispiryan, Harout Pamboukjian and others. There are dozens of songs dedicated to him, including Like an Eagle by gusan Sheram, 1904 and Andranik pasha by gusan Hayrik. Andranik also features in the popular song The Bravehearts of the Caucasus (Կովկասի քաջեր) and other pieces of Armenian patriotic folklore.

Several documentaries about Andranik have been produced; these include Andranik (1929) by Armena-Film in France, directed by Asho Shakhatuni, who also played the main role; General Andranik (1990) directed by Levon Mkrtchyan, narrated by Khoren Abrahamyan; and Andranik Ozanian, a 53-minute-long documentary by the Public Television of Armenia.

== Awards ==
Through his military career, Andranik was awarded with a number of medals and orders by governments of four countries. Andranik's medals and sword were moved to Armenia and given to the History Museum of Armenia in 2006.

Country	Award	Rank	Year
Kingdom of Bulgaria	Order of Bravery	IV grade, "For Bravery"	1913
Russian Empire	Order of St. Stanislaus	II class with Swords	1914–16
Russian Empire	Order of St. Vladimir	IV class	1914–16
Russian Empire	Cross of St. George	I, II, III class	1914–16
Russian Empire	Order of St. George	II, III, IV classes	1914–16
(France) French Republic	Legion of Honor	Officier	1919
Kingdom of Greece	War Cross	II class	1920

== Published works ==
- Մարտական հրահանգներ: Առաջարկներ, նկատողութիւններ եւ խորհուրդներ [Combat Commands: Suggestions, Remarks, Recommendations]. Geneva: ARF Press. 1906. OCLC 320038626.
- Հայկական առանձին հարուածող զօրամասը [The Armenian Special Striking Division]. Boston: Azg. 1921. OCLC 49525413.
- Զորավար Անդրանիկը կը խոսի [General Andranik Speaks]. Paris: Abaka weekly. 1921. OCLC 234085160. (1994 Boston edition)
- Առաքելոց վանքին կռիւը (Հայ յեղափոխութենէն դրուագ մը) [The Battle of Arakelots (An Episode of Armenian Revolution)]. Boston: Baikar. 1924. Memoirs of Andranik written down by Levon K. Lyulejian.
