= Capture of Erzurum (1918) =

Ottoman victory in Armenia during WWI

- Part of the Caucasus campaign of World War I
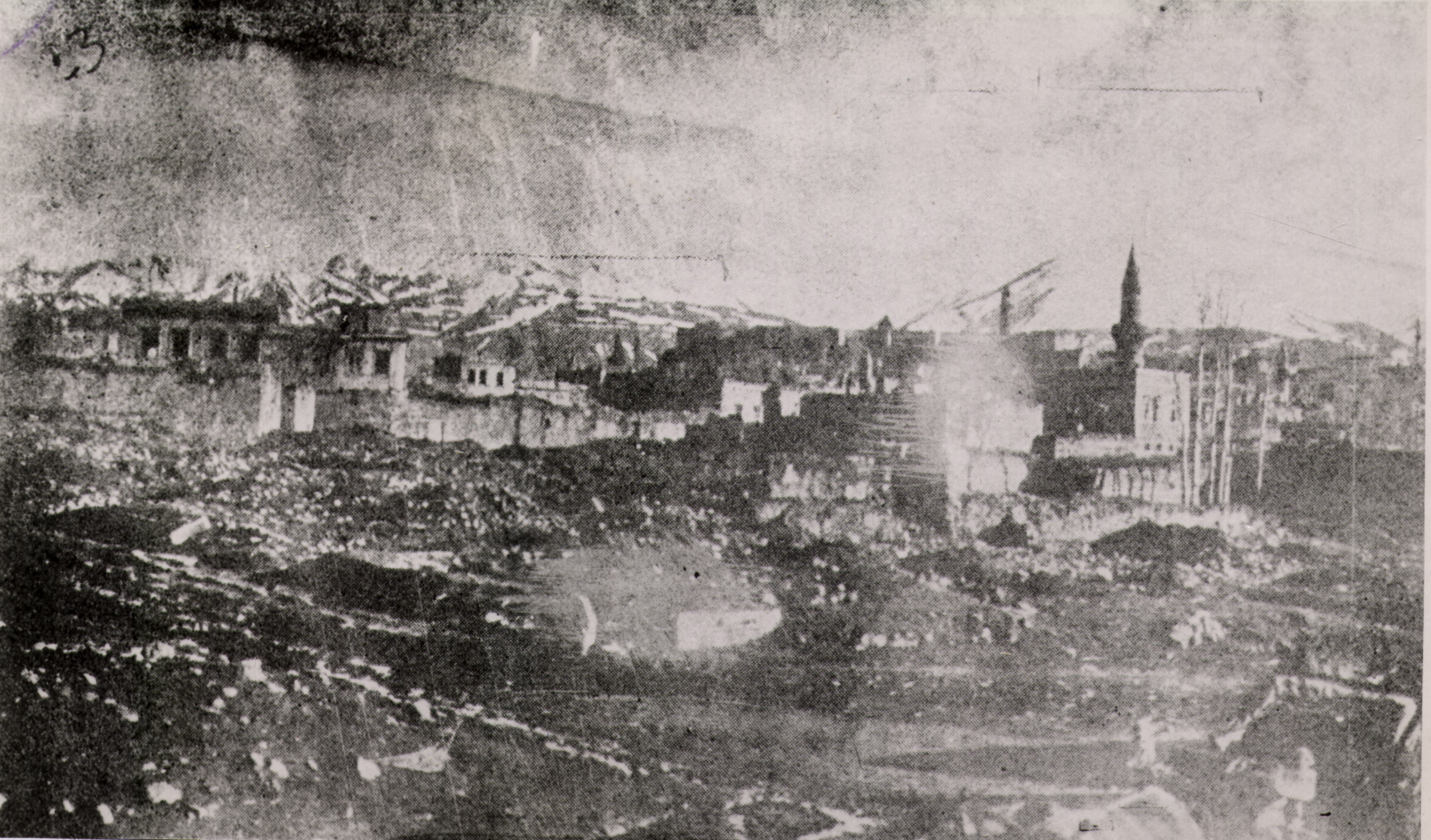
- Erzurum after the Armenian retreat.
Date	12 March 1918
Location	Erzurum, Russian-occupied Armenia 39°54′31″N 41°16′37″E
Result	Ottoman victory

Belligerents
Ottoman Empire	Armenian National Corps

Commanders and leaders
Vehip Pasha	Andranik

Units involved
Elements of 36th, 5th, and 11th Caucasian Divisions; Kurdish irregulars	1st and 4th Rifle Regiments; Special Striking Division; Volunteer battalions

Strength
4,000	3,400–9,000

Casualties and losses
	600 killed and wounded
- 20,000 Armenian inhabitants displaced/fled

The Capture of Erzurum (Note: Turkish: Erzurum'un Ele Geçirilmesi; Armenian: Էրզրումի գրաւումը, romanized: Erzrumi gravumy) in 1918 was a military operation during the Caucasus campaign of World War I, in which the Ottoman army, led by Vehip Pasha, reoccupied the strategic fortress city of Erzurum from Armenian forces. Following the collapse of the Russian Caucasian army in 1917, Ottoman forces launched a general offensive to recover lost territories and advance toward the pre-1877 frontier. The city was evacuated by Armenian forces on the night of 11 March and formally occupied by the Ottoman Empire the following morning.

== Background ==
Following the Russian Revolution in 1917, discipline in the Russian Caucasian army completely disappeared. By the end of that year, the front line was only thinly held as Russian units dissolved and soldiers returned home. In response to this vacuum, a Transcaucasian federation was established, and an Armenian National Corps was formed to attempt the defense of the occupied provinces of Turkey. The Ottoman government decided to exploit the Russian disintegration to recover its lost vilayets. The Ottoman Third Army, under the command of Vehip Pasha, was reserved for this offensive.

== Prelude ==
The Ottoman advance began in February 1918. By 13 February, Turkish columns reached the outskirts of Erzincan, forcing Armenian volunteer battalions to evacuate. The retreating Armenians moved toward Erzurum under severe winter conditions. To protect the population and the strategic junction, Erzurum was garrisoned by a detachment under the command of Andranik.

Although Erzurum was fortified with thick walls, trenches, and barbed wire left by former Russian occupying forces, the Armenian defenders suffered from a severe lack of unity, motivation, and strategic foresight among their leadership.

A major factor undermining the defense was the absence of court-martial authority and capital punishment in the Armenian military structure. In Tbilisi, Generals Tovmas Nazarbekian, Andranik, and Areshov pleaded with the National Council for the right to enforce military discipline through court-martial. Although a vote initially passed in favor of capital punishment, ARF leader Arshak Djamalian later cast a deciding vote against it, arguing that discipline should follow democratic principles.

Without strict discipline, morale among the Russian Armenian soldiers rapidly collapsed. Influenced by anti-war slogans, the Treaty of Brest-Litovsk, and political ambivalence toward Turkish Armenia, many soldiers refused to fight outside the Caucasus and began deserting. When Andranik personally attempted to lead reluctant Russian Armenian troops to the front with drawn sword, a subordinate drew his weapon on him, and on another occasion, a soldier fired a bullet that narrowly missed the general.

In early March, Andranik arrived with men from the Special Division to reinforce the deteriorating situation. The atmosphere in the city was tense. The Armenian captain Torkom, described as an "Armenian Don Quixote," had proclaimed the independence of Armenia with a 101-cannon salute. This act provoked opposition from Russian officers and outright hostility from the city's 20,000 Muslims. By 25 February, the Turkish vanguard, composed of two regiments of the 36th Caucasian Division and Kurdish irregulars, began approaching the city.

== Forces ==
=== Erzurum defense ===
Historian Stephen F. Jones writes that Armenian and Georgian forces across the entire front numbered anywhere from 25,000–30,000. Allen and Muratoff write that the Armenian garrison also included the 1st Rifle Regiment, elements of the 4th Rifle Regiment, and several volunteer battalions, totaling approximately 3,000 infantry and 400 cavalry with eight guns. According to Chalabian, General Andranik—after assessing the situation—cabled a report to the Tbilisi National Council. He described complete chaos in the command structure and detailed his forces: 4,000 professional soldiers, 4,000 irregulars, 500 professional cavalry, and 500 irregular cavalry. He also noted having 400 to 600 cannons, though 200 lacked keys and 100 were entirely out of service.

=== Ottoman ===
Jones writes that the total incoming Ottoman-aligned forces across the entire front numbered around 100,000. Chalabian states that about 4,000 Ottomans marched on Erzurum. Allen and Muratoff note that the Ottoman 36th Caucasian Division (2 regiments and Kurdish irregulars) and elements of 5th and 11th Caucasian Divisions were present.

== Fall of the city ==
By 8 March, the main body of the 36th Division, supported by elements of the 5th and 11th Caucasian Divisions, appeared along the road from Bayburt. The Armenian defensive position at Ilica was outflanked by converging Ottoman columns marching from Erçek in the north and Tekedere in the south.

Despite the presence of a fortress and heavy artillery, the Armenian forces faced critical food shortages. Andranik was unable to properly discipline his troops or contain the panic spreading among Christians, which was fueled by the mobilization of agitated Muslims influenced by the Naksibendi brotherhood. Combat conducted by fedayeen fighters led by Sebastatsi Murad and Torkom's cavalry could not halt the advancing Ottoman army and local Kurdish tribes.

=== Collapse of the defense ===
On the battlefield, betrayal and insubordination completely paralyzed the defense. On the night of 25 February, Colonel Bejanbekov, commander of the Armenian First and Fourth Regiments (comprising around 4,600 men), assured Andranik via telephone that troop morale was "excellent." However, as the planned offensive began on 26 February, Bejanbekov treacherously retreated without firing a single shot or informing the right and left wings commanded by Sebouh and Colonel Torgom. As Vehip Pasha's forces advanced behind the retreat, Torgom's forces were cut off behind enemy lines; Torgom narrowly escaped with only 31 of his 170 men after having three horses shot beneath him. Sebastatsi Murad's unit was enraged by the betrayal, noting that Turkish Armenian revolutionaries had previously aided Russian Armenians during the 1905 Armeno-Tatar clashes and were now abandoned.

Learning of the collapse, General Andranik rushed toward Ilica to rally the fleeing First and Fourth Regiments. Through force of personality, he temporarily persuaded the soldiers to turn around and open fire, momentarily halting the Turkish pursuit. However, when Andranik ordered a counterattack under Murad, the retreating troops defied him directly, shouting “We won't fight here! We won't fight anywhere!” into his face. Even after Andranik fired his revolver into the air, the Russian Armenian soldiers refused to fight on Turkish Armenian soil and deserted in mass toward Karapagh, with hundreds later being killed by Tatars in the Zabugh-Hekerlu Pass near Goris.

In a desperate bid to inspire his men, Andranik drew his sword, threw away his peaked Karakul cap, and galloped his horse directly toward the enemy lines under heavy fire; bullets pierced the snow at his horse's feet and whizzed around him. Although he survived unscathed, he found that only a pitifully small group of men had followed his charge, forcing him to withdraw.

=== Council of war and evacuation ===
A photo of Erzurum on March 14.

Returning to the city, Andranik convinced the remaining soldiers to hold the trenches behind the barbed wire for just two days until reinforcements from the Territorial Army arrived. That night, 600 Mushetsi (Note: Literally meaning, “people from Mush”.) territorial soldiers arrived, and Andranik convened a staff council attended by Colonels Morel, Zenkievich, Bejanbekov, and Dr. Hakob Zavriev. While Zenkievich and Bejanbekov argued that all means of defense were exhausted and demanded an immediate retreat, Andranik, supported by Morel, argued fiercely to hold the trenches for three days, pointing out that Erzurum possessed natural spring water supplies beneath the mountain and enough ammunition to fire continuously for four years. Andranik privately planned to allow the Turks to besiege the city with the deserters inside, forcing them to fight for survival. When confronting Bejanbekov at the Kharput Gate for the collapse of the front, Bejanbekov called his soldiers "scoundrels," to which Andranik retorted, "You are the biggest scoundrel of all!" and threatened to kill him with his revolver if Torgom did not return safely.

During a stormy war council, faced with deserting men and the threat of encirclement, the decision to evacuate the city was made. At 4:00 AM, Andranik went to the trenches to find them nearly deserted; Colonel Bejanbekov and his troops had fled during the night without firing a single shot, triggering mass panic and chaos throughout the city as the civilian population realized they were abandoned. The sight of a few remaining youths from his hometown of Shabin Karahisar guarding the empty trenches moved Andranik, and he ordered them to join the evacuation.

The Armenian civilians surrendered Erzurum with minimal resistance. Over 20,000 Armenian residents fled the historic city toward the Caucasus under disgraced circumstances. The city was formally occupied by Ottoman troops on the morning of 12 March 1918. During a rear-guard action at the gates of the city, the Armenian forces suffered approximately 600 killed and wounded. Upon reaching Sarikamish, a deeply embittered Andranik cabled his resignation to the Security Council of Armenia, stating, "Being surrounded by traitors, I resign from my post of general commander of Armenia's Territorial Army." By 14 March, the remaining Armenian forces had retreated to the old 1877 frontier at Karaurgan.

== Massacres ==
The chaotic events surrounding the capture of Erzurum led to atrocities committed by both sides. Retreating Armenian irregulars, fueled by vengeance, engaged in indiscriminate killings of Muslims and resorted to looting and burning villages. Conversely, Ottoman forces and Kurdish tribes also participated in violence, massacring Christians who did not flee the city. These events were exacerbated by the total breakdown of order and the intense ethnic and religious tensions dominating the region.

== Aftermath ==
The fall of Erzurum marked the successful completion of the first phase of the Ottoman offensive in Transcaucasia. The ease of the victory encouraged the Ottoman command to pursue further strategic goals, including the recovery of Kars and Batumi. Following the capture, Ottoman forces continued their march eastward, entering Kars on 25 April 1918 after Armenian forces were ordered to withdraw by the government in Tiflis.
