= Andranik Hakobyan =

Andranik Hakobyan may refer to:

- Andranik Hakobyan (boxer)
- Andranik Hakobyan (poet)
- Andranik Hakobyan (footballer)
