= May Uprising =

Failed Bolshevik uprising in Armenia

- A drawing by Gevorg Brutyan
| Date | May 10–14, 1920 |
| Location | Armenia |
| Result | Uprising suppressed |

Belligerents
| Republic of Armenia: Dashnaksutyun | Armenian Bolshevik Revkom: Defected government units; Muslims of Armenia supported by: Soviet Russia: Soviet Azerbaijan |

Commanders and leaders
| (First Republic of Armenia) Alexander Khatisyan (First Republic of Armenia) Sebouh Nersesian (First Republic of Armenia) Hamo Ohanjanyan (First Republic of Armenia) Ruben Ter-Minasian | Sargis Musayelian [hy] (executed); Ghukas Ghukasyan [hy] † |

The May Uprising (Armenian: Մայիսյան ապստամբություն, romanized: Mayisyan apstambutyun) was a failed Armenian Bolshevik rebellion against the government of the First Republic of Armenia. It started in Alexandopol (today Gyumri) on May 10, 1920, and was eventually suppressed by the Armenian government on May 14, with its leaders executed or exiled. Although the revolt failed, Armenia was eventually Sovietized after the 11th Army of Soviet Russia invaded the country in November 1920 and the Turkish Nationalists occupied the western half of the country. The revolt and its executed leaders were praised in Soviet Armenia until the late 1980s, when the Karabakh movement began and anti-Soviet sentiment rose in the Armenian republic. The revolt remains a controversial topic in post-Soviet Armenia.

== Background ==
Since the establishment of the First Republic of Armenia in 1918, the political parties and different factions avoided internal conflicts or rebellions against the dominant Dashnak party. The country suffered from deep economic and humanitarian crises and was at some point, during its two-year existence, at war with three of four neighboring countries (Turkey, Azerbaijan, Georgia). This changed in early 1920, after the advance of Bolshevik forces into the South Caucasus. Marxist sentiments were growing among Armenians, developing into the Union of Armenian Social Democrats. The latter was founded in 1902 in Tiflis, but remained a small movement until 1917.

The Armenian Communist Party, operating in secrecy, was founded in January 1920 to fight against the "vilifying Allied Powers and their Dashnakist 'collaborators.'" The uprising was mainly carried out by Bolsheviks born in Russian Armenia, as most of the Armenian refugees who had fled from the Ottoman Empire were "aloof" or "hostile" to Bolshevism. Part of the Armenian army was sympathetic to the uprising, following the direction of the mutineering Captain Sargis Musayelian [hy] who commanded the armored train named Vardan Zoravar (Armenian: Վարդան Զորավար, lit. 'General Vardan') in Alexandropol since February 1919.

== Revolt ==
Encouraged by the Red Army invasion of Azerbaijan in late April 1920, the Armenian Bolsheviks headed by Avis Nurijanyan staged a revolt in May. The events preceding the revolt started on May 1, 1920, International Workers' Day, with the Bolsheviks demonstrating against the government of Armenia in capital Yerevan and other cities.

The revolt escalated after the armored train Vardan Zoravar and its crew under Musayelian's command joined the Bolshevik rebels who had formed a revolutionary committee (Armenkom) and proclaimed Armenia a Soviet state in Alexandopol on May 10. During the revolt, much of the Armenian army vacillated. Among those who broke ranks and joined the Bolsheviks was Ivan Bagramyan. The Bolshevik rebels successfully took over Alexandropol, Kars and Sarikamish. On May 5, 1920, the cabinet of Alexander Khatisian resigned and a new one was formed under Hamo Ohanjanyan's leadership. It was entirely made up of Dashnak party members. The parliament gave up its rights to the government since Armenia was under state of emergency. Sebouh Nersesian was appointed commander to suppress the revolt. On May 13 his unit reached Gyrumri and by the next day the rebels left the city, and the government forces entered the city and established order.

== Aftermath ==
The Bolshevik leaders of the revolt were imprisoned. Later, some of the leaders, including Stepan Alaverdian, Sargis Musayelian, and Bagrat Gharibdjanian, were killed while being transferred between prisons. There were rumors that Anastas Mikoyan was also executed, "even though Mikoyan did not participate in the May Uprising and was not in Armenia at the time."

The Soviet government in Moscow warned on June 4 that diplomatic relations would be "detrimentally affected" if the "persecution of Communists continued." As Richard G. Hovannisian concluded, the fact that several notable Dashnaks were imprisoned in Soviet Russia and Azerbaijan at the time "must certainly have had a moderating influence" on Yerevan. Following the Soviet invasion of Zangezur and the capture and torture of Dashnaks, the Communist party of Armenia was banned in Armenia. This, combined with the imprisonment and exile of the leaders of the May Uprising, completely halted Bolshevik activity within the country.

Armenia's domestic situation continued to deteriorate as the government lost favour and hope among the people and Allied officials. After three months, the Turkish and then Soviet invasion of Armenia led to the Treaty of Alexandropol on December 3, effectively partitioning Armenia between Turkish and Soviet rule. The government of the First Republic of Armenia then cleared the way for a new government that accomplished the purpose sought in the uprising. The Armenian Soviet Socialist Republic was declared on November 29, 1920, and became a constituent part of the Union of Soviet Socialist Republics in 1922.

== Legacy ==
=== Soviet period ===
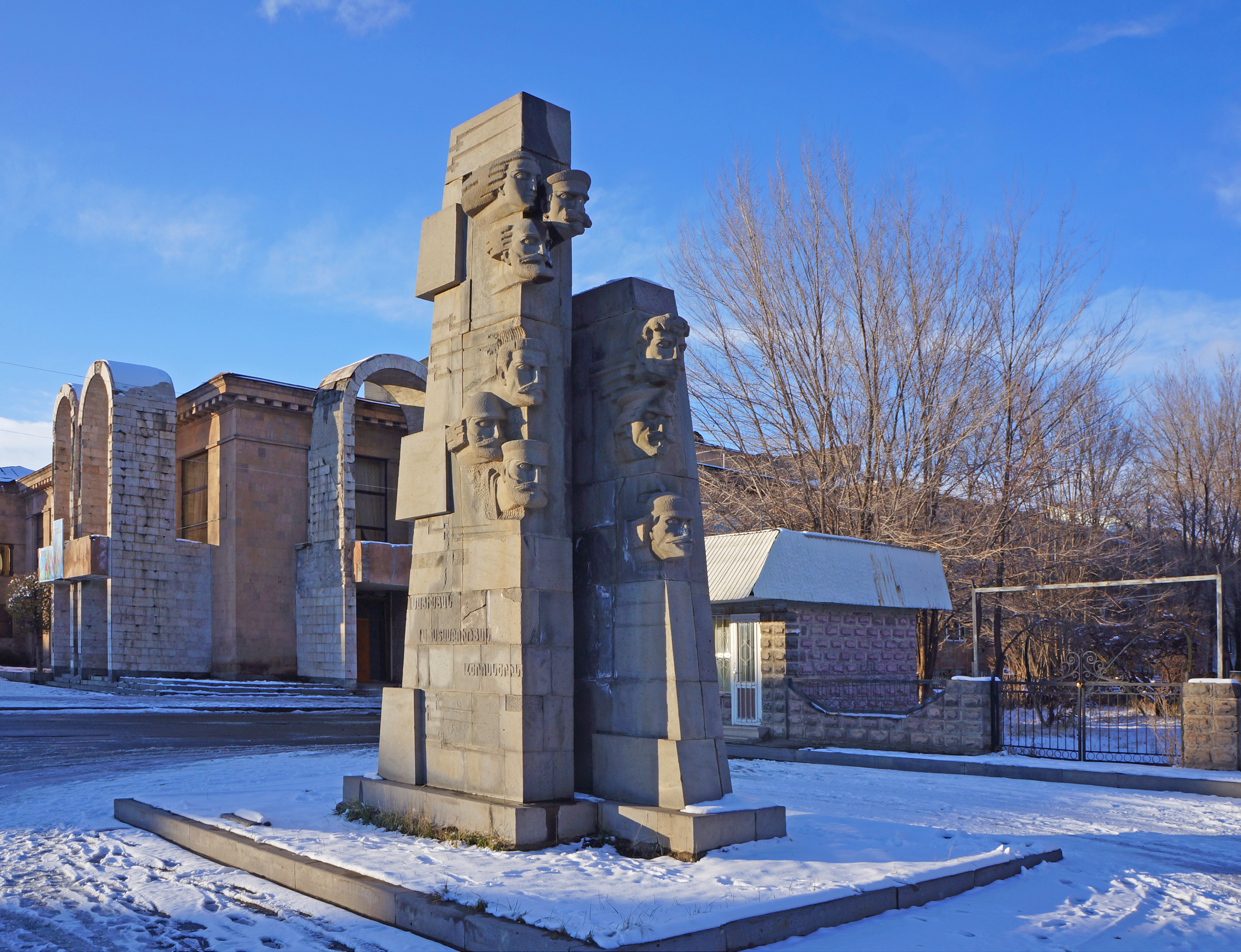
Soviet monument to the participants of the May Uprising in Gyumri

The revolt was both extensively criticized and praised in Soviet Armenian historiography and frequently presented as a "heroic struggle". Several books were written on it. Anastas Mikoyan lauded the uprising as "a mass popular movement [that] spoke to the growth of the socialist revolution in Armenia, and to the continuation of the October Revolution on Armenian territory." He once likened it to Fidel Castro's attack on the Moncada Barracks in Cuba during a meeting with Armenian historians in Yerevan in March 1962. Numerous settlements in Soviet Armenia were named after notable Bolshevik participants of the revolt, including Gandzak (formerly named Batikian after Batik Batikian), Sarukhan (after Hovhannes Sarukhanian), Nahapetavan (after Nahapet Kurghinian), Gharibjanyan (after Bagrat Gharibjanyan), Musayelian (after Sargis Musayelian), Mayisyan (after the uprising itself), and Ashotsk (formerly named Ghukasyan after Ghukas Ghukasyan).

A statue of Ghukas Ghukasyan was erected in 1935 in the park near the Agrarian University in central Yerevan. The statue was blown up in 1990, during the height of anti-Soviet sentiment in Armenia. In 2009, the statue of prominent Armenian astrophysicist Viktor Hambardzumyan was put on its place. The central square of Gyumri (known as Leninakan during the Soviet period) was renamed after the revolt. It is now called Vardanants Square.

=== Republic of Armenia (1991–present) ===
The revolt remains a somewhat controversial topic even in post-Soviet Armenia. According to a study of Armenian school textbooks "the tone of the account remains fairly restrained and neutral, a certain interpretation of the events is not imposed on the students." The use of the term "uprising" in these textbooks, however—as opposed to "rebellion", as with contemporary instances of Muslim unrest—betrays a slight sympathy towards the Bolsheviks.

During a 2010 anti-government rally, Armenia's first president and opposition leader Levon Ter-Petrosyan stated:

Some of the Dashnak leaders retrospectively confessed that had they handed the power to the Bolsheviks in May, 1920, Armenia would have not lost the regions of Kars, Ardahan, Surmalu and Nakhichevan, and in that case the solution of the Karabagh issue could have also been different. Yet, instead of doing that, they remorselessly slaughtered the leaders of the May Uprising and threw hundreds of the participants in prisons, unwisely triggering Russia's wrath and hostility, to put things mildly, and imposing a bitter price for it on our homeland.

== See also ==
- Sovietization of Armenia
- 1920 Georgian coup attempt
- February uprising

== Bibliography ==
- Hovannisian, Richard G. (1996a). The Republic of Armenia. Vol. 3: From London to Sèvres, February–August 1920. Berkeley: University of California Press. ISBN 978-0520088030.
- Hovannisian, Richard G. (1996b). The Republic of Armenia. Vol. 4: Between Crescent and Sickle: Partition and Sovietization. Berkeley: University of California Press. ISBN 978-0520088047.
- Kiesling, Brady (June 2000). Rediscovering Armenia: An Archaeological/Touristic Gazetteer and Map Set for the Historical Monuments of Armenia (PDF). Archived (PDF) from the original on November 6, 2021.
- Panossian, Razmik (2006). The Armenians: From Kings and Priests to Merchants and Commissars. New York: Columbia University Press. ISBN 978-0231139267.
- Shakarian, Pietro A. (2025). Anastas Mikoyan: An Armenian Reformer in Khrushchev's Kremlin. Bloomington: Indiana University Press. ISBN 978-0253073556.
