= Hayastan (daily) =

Hayastan (Armenian: Հայաստան) was an Armenian public and political daily newspaper published from April 1917 to February 1918 in Tbilisi (Tiflis) by General Andranik.

== History ==
The editors were Vahan Totovents and Levon Tutunjian. Hovhannes Tumanian supported daily's publication. The daily was related to National Council of Western Armenians and genocide refugees, defensed their interests. The daily started a new political movement led by Andranik.

Hayastan frequently published articles by Andranik and Tumanian.
