= Sebouh Nersesian =

Armenian military commander

Arshag Nersesian
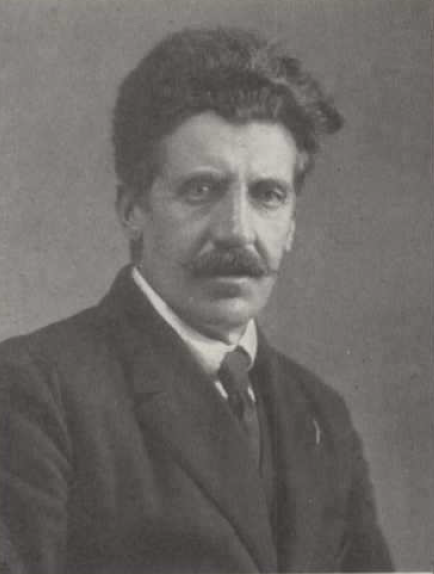
- Born: Արշակ Ներսէսեան; 1872; Tomna, near Bayburt, Ottoman Empire
- Died: 1940 (aged 67–68); New York City, New York
- Other name: Sebouh
- Years active: 1890s–1920
- Political party: Armenian Revolutionary Federation

Arshag Nersesian (Armenian: Արշակ Ներսէսեան; 1872–1940), better known by his nom de guerre Sebouh or General Sebouh (Armenian: Զօրավար Սեպուհ), was an Armenian military commander. He was the right-hand man of General Andranik Ozanian.

== Early life ==
He was born in 1872 in Tomna (a village north of Bayburt, which is in modern-day Turkey) as Arshag Nersesian. He later took the pseudonym Sebouh. He became involved in Armenian revolutionary activities while as a youth. He received his education in Trebizond (prior to World War I, that Armenian community numbered 30,000) and showed early aptitude as a craftsman. When he was twenty-years-old and working as a shoemaker in a village near Erzincan, his village was slaughtered by Turkish soldiers during the Hamidian massacres, however, he survived and swore to "kill every Turk he set his eyes on".

== Revolutionary activities ==
In 1889, he left for Constantinople. In 1894, General Sebouh left the Social Democratic Hunchakian Party and joined the Armenian Revolutionary Federation (ARF-Dashnaktsutyun). He later became a leader of the Dashnaktsutyun. As a member of the ARF, he became a commander under General Andranik Ozanian. In 1894, he took part in the uprisings in Sasun. Sebouh took part in battles at Tabek, Shenik and Semal, where he was later wounded. He fought in battles in Tadvan, Aghtamar Island and Van. In 1907, Sebouh participated in the ARF party congress at Vienna. Sebouh and Andranik took part in battles in Khoy, Dilman, and Salmas (West Azerbaijan, Iran) in 1914–1915.

Sebouh fought in the decisive Battle of Sardarabad and later went on to help the Armenians besieged in Baku. In 1919, General Sebouh was elected to the parliament of the First Republic of Armenia.

General Sebouh was known for assassinating traitors, suppressing the Bolshevik uprising in May 1920, and crushing the Alexandropol Soviet.

== Armenian-Turkish War ==
On December 20, 1920, General Sebouh took refuge in Tiflis (Georgia) where he was soon joined by the majority of the members of the Dashnak bureau, who set up a liberation committee there.

In Tiflis, General Sebouh assumed leadership of a force of 500 volunteers which was sent to Salmas. Armen Garo sent General Sebouh in 1921 to Boston where he joined Aharon Sachaklian.

General Sebouh became the first Armenian officer to come to the United States and obtain a United States loan to rehabilitate the Armenian army. In Boston, General Sebouh was financing Soghomon Tehlirian and Operation Nemesis, which led to the assassination of Talat Pasha.

== In the United States ==
Sebouh toured the United States as a field worker of the ARF (Armenian Revolutionary Federation). He helped to expand the ARF's presence throughout the country. He was the head of the "secret special" mission in the United States, having taken over its direction at the request of Armen Garo. In 1925, he wrote his memoir Edjer im housheren (Pages from My Memoirs).

== Death ==
Sebouh settled permanently in Detroit, where he maintained a grocery business. In 1936 he and his family moved to New York. He died on July 31, 1940, at age 66. Sebouh's sons joined Garegin Nzhdeh's Tseghakrons (precursor to the Armenian Youth Federation).

On November 20, 2014, the remains of General Sebouh were interred in Yerevan's military cemetery at Yerablur.

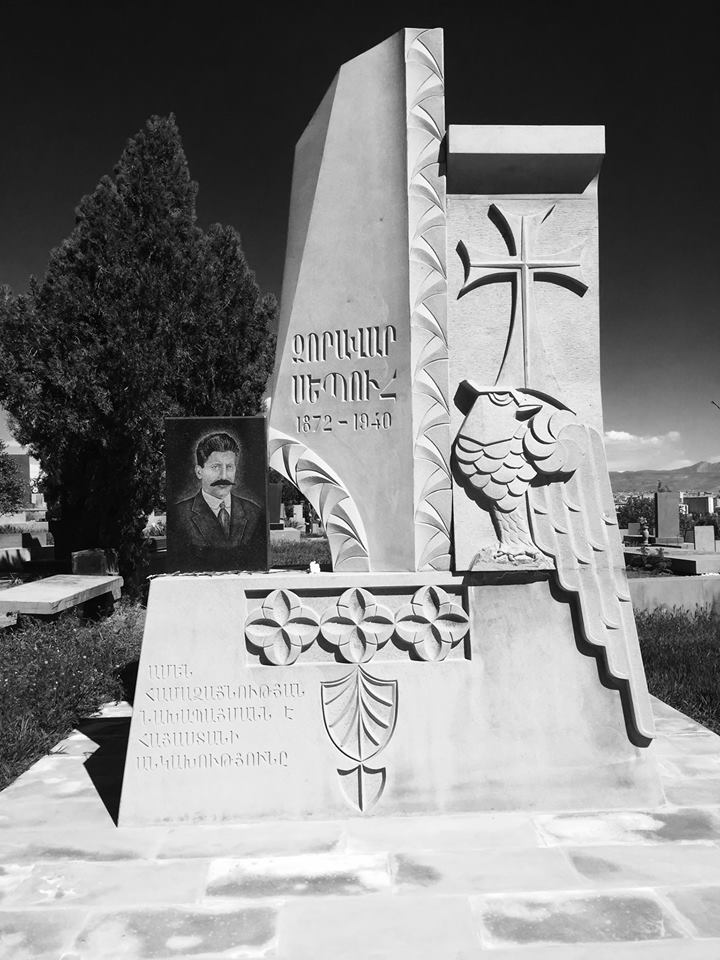
General Sebouh's memorial at Yerevan's military cemetery at Yerablur.

== Sources ==
- Resistance and Revenge: The Armenian Assassination of the Turkish Leaders responsible for 1915 by Jacques Derogy
- Like One Family: The Armenians of Syracuse by Arpena S. Mesrobian
- "Armenia: The Survival of a Nation", revised second edition © 1990 Christopher J. Walker
