= Andranikological Review =

- Discipline: Armenian history
- Language: Armenian
- Edited by: Ashot Grigoryan

Publication details
- History: 2002–2004
- Frequency: Biannual

Standard abbreviations
- ISO 4: Andranikol. Rev.

Links
- Journal homepage

The Andranikological Review (Review on Andranik Studies, Armenian: Անդրանիկագիտական Հանդես) was an Armenian youth historical half-yearly periodical published in Yerevan, in 2002–2004. The main purpose of Andranikological Review was the historical studies of the biography, ideological and military activities of General Andranik Ozanian, national hero of Armenia, also the collection and preservation of historical documents and artifacts, related to the period of Andranik's activities.

Andranikological Review was a book-like historical publication with research papers and book reviews (each issue typically runs to about 50 pages). Among the authors of the Review were Norayr Musheghian, Antranig Chalabian (United States), Artsvi Bakhchinyan and others. Editor of the review was Ashot Grigoryan ("Andranik Youth Club"). It was the first Armenian periodical devoted exclusively to the research of one person's life and activities. The Armenian newspaper Nor Dar (Russia) called it "a brief encyclopedy of the great General's life and the period of his activities".
