= Hamastegh =

- Համաստեղ
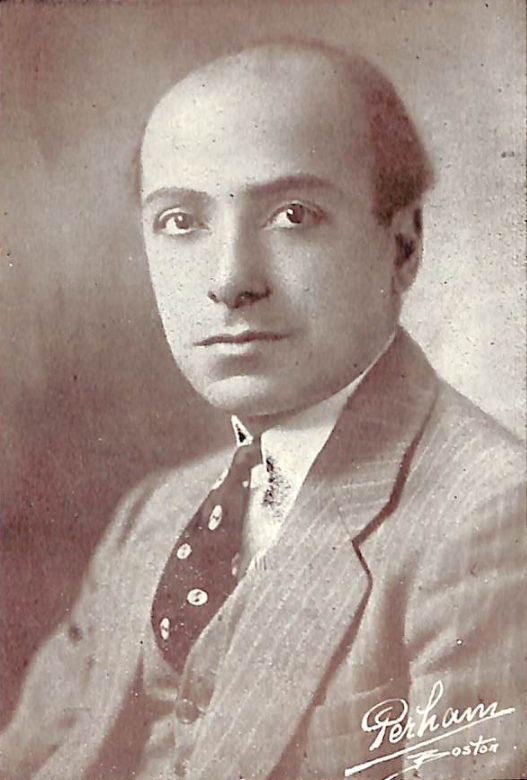
- Born: Hambartsum Gelenian; November 26, 1895; Kharpert, Western Armenia, Ottoman Empire
- Died: November 26, 1966 (aged 71); Los Angeles, California, United States
- Resting place: Boston
- Citizenship: Ottoman Empire; United States
- Education: Columbia University
- Spouse: Srbuhi Bekian-Gelenian
- Children: Lori Kelenian (firstborn daughter)
- Relatives: Vahan Totovents
- Writing career
- Pen name: Hamastegh
- Language: Western Armenian
- Period: 1921-1966

Hamasdegh (also Hamastegh, Armenian: Համաստեղ), born Hambartsum Gelenian (Armenian: Համբարձում Կելենեան, 26 November 1895, Kharpert, Western Armenia, Ottoman Empire – 26 November 1966, New York City) was a poet and writer of the Armenian diaspora.

== Biography ==
Hamasdegh (born Hampartsum Gelenian) was born in Perchenj village of Kharbert on November 26, 1895. He received his primary education in the village school and continued his studies in the Central School of Mezire (now Elâzığ), where he was one of the founders of provincial literature and one of the students of the writer Tlkatintsi (Hovhannes Haroutiunian), a victim of the Armenian Genocide.

After graduating in 1911, Hamasdegh taught for a year in his hometown and then immigrated to the United States, following his father's advice. He attended courses at Columbia University (New York) and Boston University. He started working for "Hayrenik" daily in 1918, adopting the pen name Hamasdegh, combining the first syllables of the names of the three Gelenian brothers (Hambardzum, Asatur, Yeghia).

In 1920, he was in New York for a year, where he first met and then became close to Shirvanzade. Later, in 1930, he became close to Isahakyan in Paris, who had just left Soviet Armenia.

Among the well-known works of Hamasdegh are the collections of stories “The village” (Armenian: «Գիւղը», Romanized: "Kiughu") and "The rain" (Armenian: «Անձրեւը», Romanized: “Antsrevu”), which describe the Armenian village with its unique past and images. Other works include the novel "The White Horseman" and the satirical short stories entitled "Courageous Nazar," the drama "The Trumpeter of the Mountains of Armenia," and the "First Love" novel.

On November 26, 1966, in Los Angeles, at the solemn evening dedicated to his seventieth birthday, Hamasdegh died suddenly at the podium. He was later buried in Boston.
