= Ujan =

Ujan Ուջան
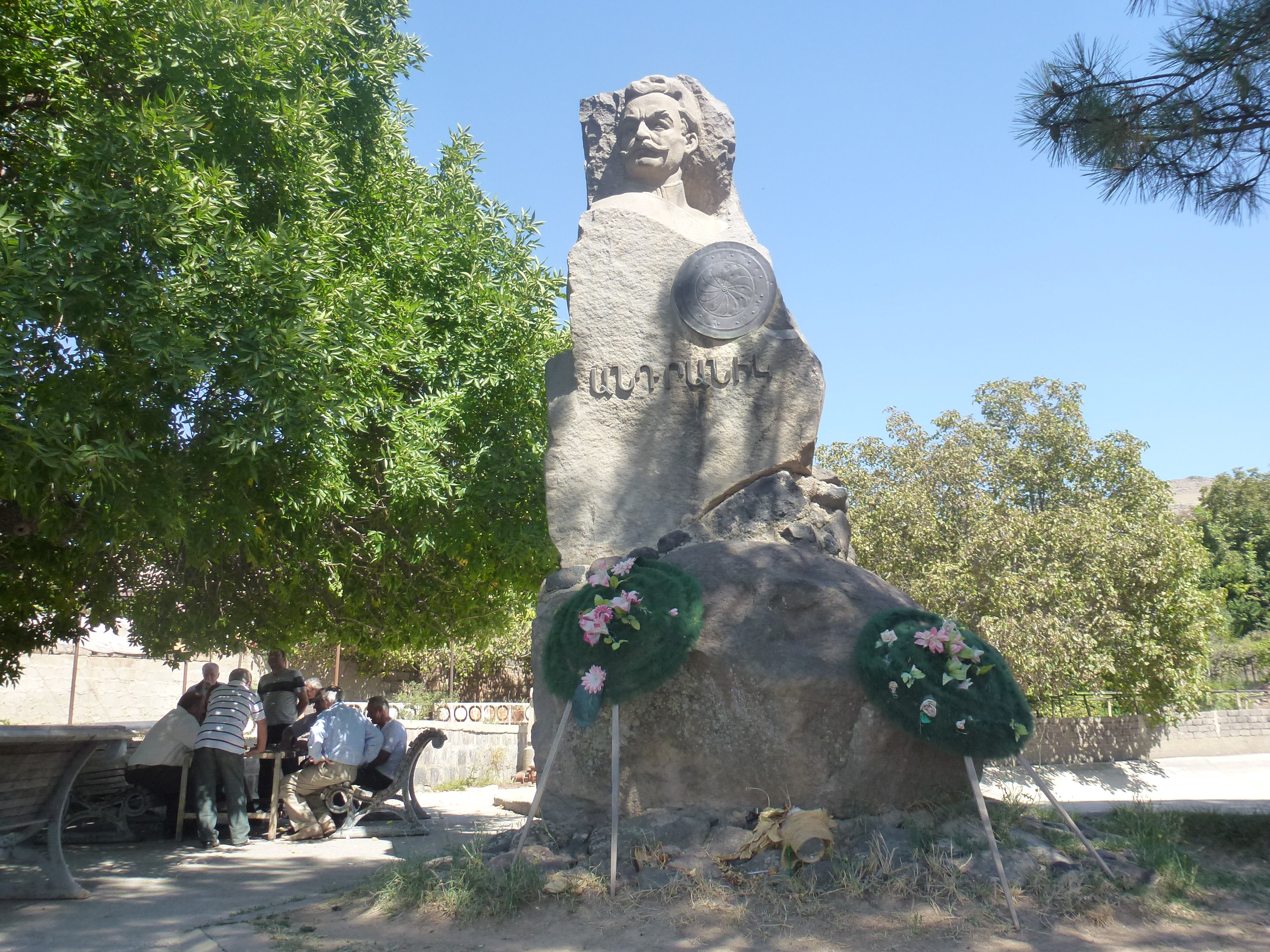
- The statue of Andranik in Ujan

- Location within Armenia Location within Aragatsotn
- Coordinates: 40°17′54″N 44°12′17″E
- Country: Armenia
- Province: Aragatsotn
- Municipality: Ashtarak
- Elevation: 1,150 m (3,770 ft)

Population (2011)
  - Total: 2,505
- Time zone: UTC+4
  - Summer (DST): UTC+5

Ujan (Armenian: Ուջան) is a village in the Ashtarak Municipality of the Aragatsotn Province of Armenia.

Ujan is home to the first statue of General Andranik erected in Armenia. It was secretly erected at night on 4 June 1967.

== Gallery ==
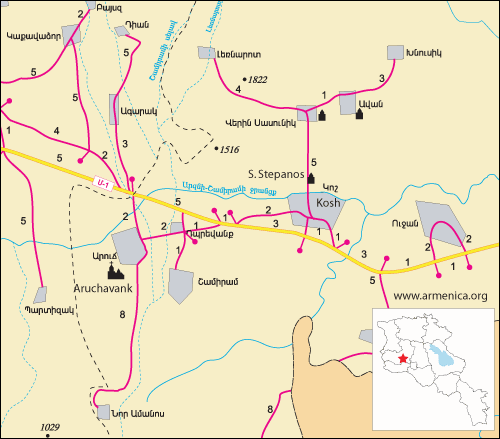
Map of Ujan and the surrounding region.
