= Richardson Springs, California =

Unincorporated community in California, United States

Richardson Springs
- Unincorporated community
- Location in California Richardson Springs (the United States)
- Coordinates: 39°50′24″N 121°46′37″W
- Country: United States
- State: California
- County: Butte
- Elevation: 620 ft (189 m)

Richardson Springs (formerly, Mud Springs) is an unincorporated community in Butte County, California, United States. It is located on Mud Creek, 8.5 miles (13.7 km) north-northeast of Chico, at an elevation of 620 feet (189 m). The place is named for J.H. and Lee Richardson, who founded mineral spas here in 1898. A post office was opened in 1933.

== History ==
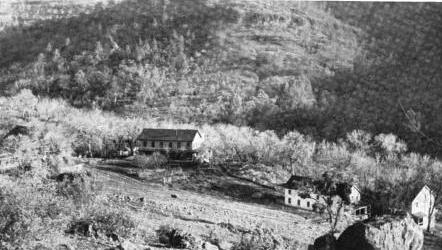
A view of Richardson Springs, California in 1915

The Richardson brothers built a hotel, named the Richardson Springs Hotel, completed in 1903 that boasted a 14-bedroom wooden frame building on their ranch. Their ranch featured an old Native American spring, the mud of which was claimed to be able to heal cuts and skin diseases. One listing in 1913 stated that rooms were between $12–14 per week and the resort was reachable by stagecoach which ran to Chico nearly daily. In 1921, this hotel burned down but was reconstructed and reopened in 1924.

In 1914–1915, natural gas was discovered near Mud Creek and piped for use at the resort for lighting and heating. Speculation was also made that oil might be nearby as well.

During the filming of The Adventures of Robin Hood, many of the actors frequented the resort at Richardson Springs. During World War II, soldiers stayed at the hotel; the imposed rationing of gasoline and other goods slowed patronage.

The resort was renovated with modern fixtures and furniture, including a bar, in 1956. However, with business not picking up, the site was sold to Springs of Living Water, Inc., a non-profit Christian organization, in 1968.

The hotel is now owned by YWAM Chico, a non-profit Christian organization.

== Notable person ==
- Andranik Ozanian, Armenian national hero, died in Richardson Springs in 1927
