= Battle of Dilman =

Battle in World War I

- Part of the Persian campaign of World War I
Date	15 April 1915
Location	Dilman, Qajar Iran
Result	Russian coalition victory

Belligerents
Russian Empire: Armenian volunteer units; Armenian fedayi; Assyrian volunteers	Ottoman Empire

Commanders and leaders
Tovmas Nazarbekian; Andranik Ozanian	Halil Pasha

Strength
10 battalions of Russian Caucasus Army; 1 battalion of Armenian volunteers	248 Officers; 10,920 troops 12,000 irregular Kurdish cavalry

Casualties and losses
Unknown	3,500 killed

The Battle of Dilman, took place on 15 April 1915 during World War I. It was fought at Dilman, Qajar Iran between the Russian Empire and the Ottoman Empire.

Despite having the larger forces, the Ottomans suffered 468 dead, 1,228 wounded, and 370 missing in the first day. Many injured Ottoman soldiers were abandoned on the field of battle. More than half of the Ottoman troops were Kurdish, almost all of whom deserted. By the end of the battle, the Ottomans had 3,500 of its soldiers killed.

The result was a Russian victory under Tovmas Nazarbekian. Armenian and Assyrian volunteers had an important role in the victory.

One month later, Halil Kut abandoned Persia with his army reduced to half of its original size. Halil blamed his defeat on the Christians and ordered the execution of all Armenians and Assyrians among his own soldiers. German military advisors reported the murder of several hundred unarmed Armenian and Assyrian soldiers and officers. The Armenian and Assyrian civilians of northwestern Persia were also massacred by Ottoman troops.

== See also ==
- Sarkis Jebejian
