= Vahan Totovents =

Armenian writer, poet, and public activist (1894–1938)

Vahan Totovents Վահան Թոթովենց
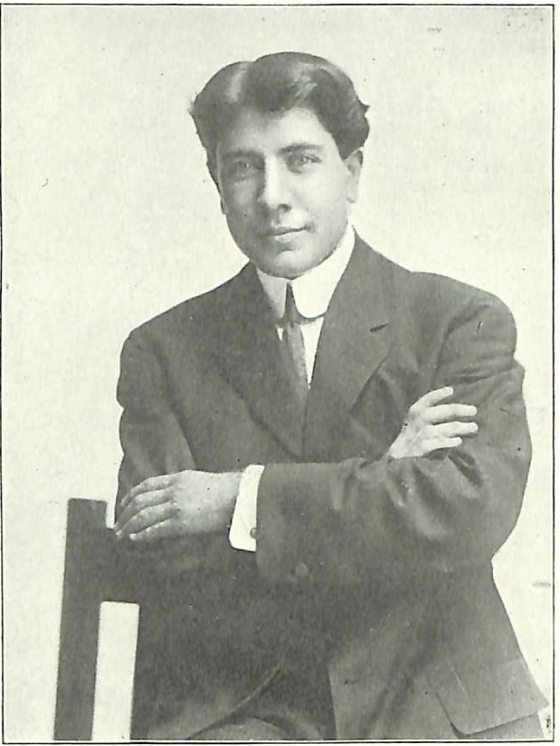
- Born: July 18, 1894; Mezre, Kharberd vilayet, Ottoman Empire
- Died: July 18, 1938 (aged 44); Yerevan, Armenian SSR, Soviet Union
- Education: University of Wisconsin–Madison
- Occupations: Writer, poet, public activist
- Spouse: Lousik Abeghian
- Writing career
- Language: Armenian

Vahan Hovhannesi Totovents (Armenian: Վահան Յովհաննէսի Թոթովենց; July 18, 1894 – July 18, 1938) was an Armenian writer, poet, and public activist.

== Biography ==
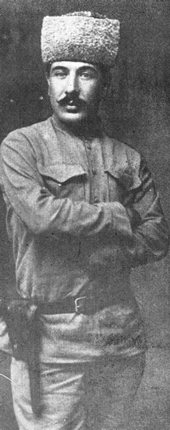
Vahan Totovents as aide camp to General Antranik Ozanian

Vahan Totovents was born in the town of Mezre (now Elazığ) in the vilayet of Kharberd. He was one of seven children, and he was only eight when he lost his father—a prosperous landowner and a high government official. After an elementary education, the young Totovents went to the Armenian Central School in the large nearby town of Kharpert, where two of his teachers were well-known authors Tlgadintsi and Rupen Zartarian, who influenced his style of writing, despite its individuality. His first book appeared in 1908. He left for Constantinople in 1908. In 1909 he went to Paris, and then to New York. At the same time, he mastered English and French, and studied literature, history, and philosophy at the University of Wisconsin.

During the First World War, in 1915, Totovents went to the Caucasus as a volunteer in defense of his country: this was the year in which the whole of Western Armenia was depleted of its Armenian population during the Armenian genocide. During World War I, he served as a secretary to Andranik Ozanian and participated in the battles of Erzurum and Van. He then worked with poet Hovhannes Tumanyan to organized humanitarian relief for survivors of the genocide. He edited the newspaper Hayastan in Tiflis in 1917-18 and wrote numerous articles, a novel, literary studies, and other material. In 1920 he again went to America, and two years later he returned to Eastern (by then Soviet) Armenia, where he devoted all his time to writing. His output included novels, short-stories, plays and poems.

Totovents welcomed the sovietization of Armenia and moved to Soviet Armenia in 1922, convinced that the "salvation of the Armenian people was connected with the Russian people and the October Revolution." During the NEP period, he worked for the satirical monthly Shesht in 1923 and for the official state newspaper Sovetakan Hayastan in 1924–26. He also worked at Yerevan State University. Totovents was arrested in 1936 and executed in 1938 during Joseph Stalin's Great Purge. He was posthumously rehabilitated on January 29, 1955, during the Khrushchev Thaw.

== Works ==
Totovents published his first work in 1907. His notable works include the novels, stories and dramas Doktor Burbonian (1918), Mahvan batalion ("Death Battalion", 1923), New York (1927), Baku (v. 1–3, 1930–34), Hovnatʻan vordi Yeremiayi ("Jonathan, Son of Jeremiah", 1934). Particularly influential was Totovents's Kyankʻě hin Hṛomeakan chanaparhi vra ("Life on the Old Roman Highway"), an "unsurpassed effort" consisting of "fragmented memories of his birthplace." The Soviet Armenian film A Piece of Sky (1980), directed by Henrik Malyan, is based on Totovents's short story "Pale Blue Flowers" (1935).

His works have been translated into Russian, English, French, Bulgarian and Turkish.

== Books ==
=== In English ===
- Scenes from an Armenian Childhood, 1962, NY: Oxford University Press, 182 p.,
- Tell Me, Bella (a Selection of Stories), 1972, 127 p., ISBN 0-903039-06-0,
- Jonathan, Son of Jeremiah (Mashtots paperbacks), 1985, 68 p., ISBN 0-903039-16-8,
- Pigeon Fancier, 1994, 66 p., ISBN 0-903039-18-4.

=== In French ===
- Une enfance arménienne, Julliard, 1985, 194 p., ISBN 2-260-00401-6.

== See also ==
- Armenian literature
- Armenian victims of the Great Purge
