= Tovmas Nazarbekian =

Armenian military commander (1855–1931)

General Tovmas Nazarbekian Թովմաս Նազարբեկյան
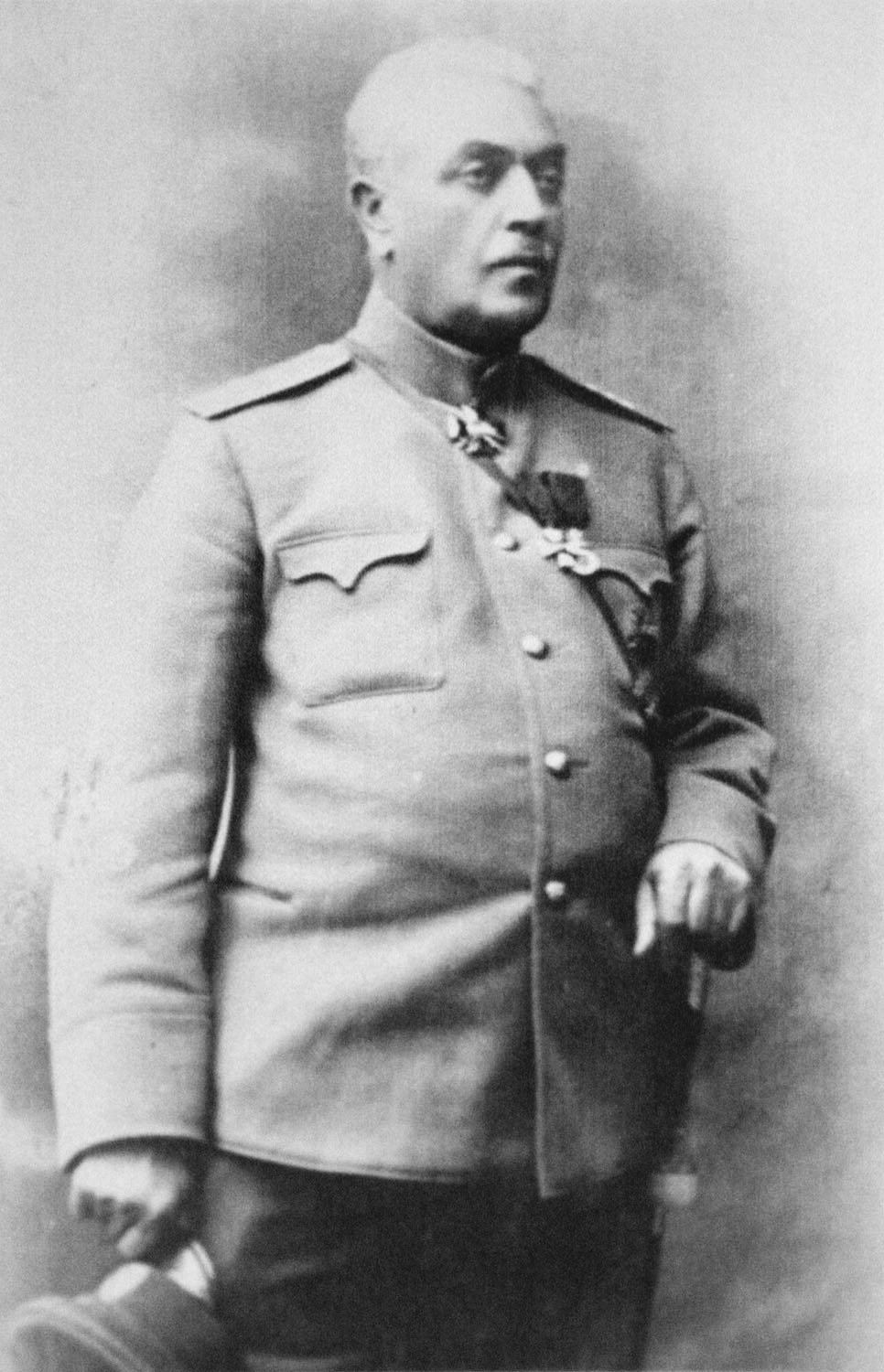
- Born: 4 April 1855; Tiflis, Tiflis Governorate, Russian Empire
- Died: 19 February 1931 (aged 75); Tiflis, Georgian SSR, Soviet Union
- Military career
- Allegiance: Russian Empire (1876–1917); Republic of Armenia (1918–1920)
- Service years: 1876–1920
- Rank: Major-general (Russia); Lieutenant general (Armenia)
- Commands: 66th Infantry Division; 2nd Brigade of the Caucasus
- Conflicts: Russo-Turkish War; Russo-Japanese War; World War I; Persian Campaign; Caucasus Campaign; Battle of Dilman; Battle of Muş; Battle of Sardarabad; Battle of Karakilisa; Armenian National Liberation Movement
- Awards: see below

Tovmas Nazarbekian (Armenian: Թովմաս Նազարբէկեան; 4 April 1855 – 19 February 1931), also known as Foma Nazarbekov (Russian: Фома Назарбеков), was an Armenian general in the Russian Caucasus Army and later promoted to commander-in-chief of the First Republic of Armenia.

== Early life ==
Tovmas (Thomas) Nazarbekian was born to a wealthy Russianized noble family of Armenian descent in Tiflis. He attended the military academy in Moscow. His early military engagements include the Russo-Turkish War of 1877–78 and the Russo-Japanese War of 1904–05.

Nazarbekian was awarded the Order of Saint Stanislaus for his contribution to the storming of the fortress of Ardahan during the 1877–1878 Russo-Turkish War. He was also awarded the Order of St. Anna for his success in Erzurum. In 1902, he was promoted to colonel. Years later in the 1904–1905 Russo-Japanese War, Nazarbekian was awarded the Gold Sword for Bravery for distinguished service during the Battle of Mukden. After the war, he attained the rank of Major-general in 1906.

== World War I ==
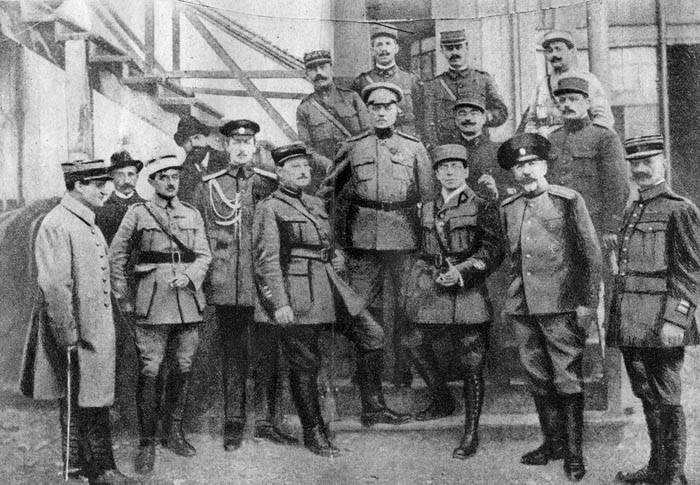
Nazarbekian (center) with high-ranking army officers.

Following the outbreak of World War I, he was appointed as a general to fight in the Caucasus, initially in the Persian Campaign. His military achievements include his victory in the Battle of Dilman over Khalil Pasha. He also commanded the forces that took Bitlis in the dead of winter, and took his army down through the mountains of Eastern Anatolia to the plains of Mush. He engaged with the Ottoman 3rd Army at the Battle of Mush and captured the city Mush. Later he moved toward Bitlis. The success in Battle of Bitlis led to the furthermost Russian advance into Anatolia. These military achievements earned him the admiration of military critics both in Europe and America. In this position, he supported the British Mesopotamian Army by disrupting supply lines. He established the outposts which made possible the further advance of the British in the Mesopotamian campaign. Following the army's advance beyond Bitlis, he was in close co-operation with the British General Marshal. General Nazarbekov, for his achievements, was decorated by the French Government.

In 1917, the chaos caused by the Russian Revolution put a stop to all Russian military operations and the regular Russian regiments deserted from the frontline. In this situation, during December 1917, the Armenian volunteer units realigned themselves under the command of Nazarbekian, with Dro as a civilian commissioner. The Tiflis (Armenian Congress of Eastern Armenians which united with the Armenian National Councils) collected 50,000 soldiers under Nazarbekian. On 5 December 1917, the Special Transcaucasian Committee negotiated with the 3rd Army the Armistice of Erzincan, which froze the conflicts until 7 February 1918. Before 7 February the regiments of the Armenian Corps were immediately deployed to the front. With the help of their Christian neighbors, Armenian forces increased in size until they numbered 150,000 armed men on the border. By the end of January, 1918, Nazarbekian's divisions occupied the major positions from Yerevan to Van and Erzinjan. In the following conflicts, he was driven back to Dilidjan in May 1918. However, at the Battle of Karakilisa he pushed the advancing Ottoman 3rd Army back for a few days, giving the Armenian forces time to prepare for the Battle of Sardarabad.

== First Republic of Armenia ==
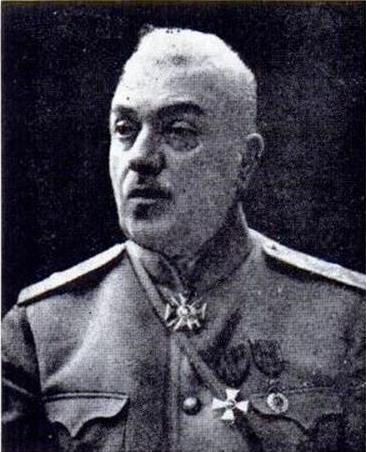
Nazarbekian

Nazarbekian was appointed the first ever Chief of the General Staff of the Armed Forces of the First Republic of Armenia. He used his knowledge and experience to aid in the creation of the Armenian regular army. On 25 March 1919 he was appointed Chairman of the Military Council of Armenia, and on 15 July 1919 he was awarded the rank of lieutenant general. Nazarbekian remained politically neutral during the years of the First Republic.

During the Sovietization of Armenia, he was arrested with other Armenian officers in January 1921, but released four months later. He settled in his hometown Tiflis, where he lived quietly and wrote a series of memoirs about the war on the Caucasus Campaign from 1914 to 1918. Nazarbekian remained in Tiflis until his death in 1931.

== Awards ==
- Order of Saint Stanislaus, 3rd class with Swords, "For excellence in the storming of the fortress Ardahan" (1877)
- Order of St. Anna, 3rd class with Swords, "For distinguished service under Erzurum" (1878)
- Order of St. Anna, 2nd class with Bow, "25 years of service" (1878)
- Gold Sword for Bravery (18 June 1906)
- Order of St. Vladimir, 3rd class with Swords (1905)
- Order of Saint Stanislaus, 1st class with Swords (1915)
- Order of St. Anna, 1st class (1915)
- Order of St. George, 4th class (7 January 1916)
- Order of St. Vladimir, 2nd class with Swords (1916)
- Gold Sword for Bravery
- Medal "In memory of the 300th anniversary of the reign of the Romanovs"

== See also ==
- Battle of Sardarabad
