= Tsatur Aghayan =

Armenian Historian (1912-1982)

Tsatur Pavel Aghayan (Armenian: Ծատուր Պավելի Աղայան; 12 January 1912 [O.S. 30 December 1911] – 3 December 1982) was a Soviet-Armenian historian, a professor at Yerevan State University, an academician of the Armenian Academy of Sciences, the editor of the journal Lraber Hasarakakan Gitutyunneri, and a renowned scientist of the Armenian SSR (1974). Aghayan was born in the village of Pip, Dashkesan.

He headed the branches of Soviet and modern history at the Institute of History (Armenian Sciences Academy), and from 1961 to 1968, he directed the Armenian branch of the Institute of Marxism-Leninism. His works are dedicated to the Armenian National Liberation Movement of the 19th and 20th centuries, Andranik Ozanian's activities, and the socioeconomic conditions of pre-Soviet Transcaucasia. He died in 1982 in Yerevan. In 1985, he was posthumously awarded the State Prize of the Armenian SSR.

He is buried in the Tokhmakh cemetery with Siranush Aghayan Simoni.

== Works ==
- From the history of Armenian people's liberational movement, Yerevan, 1976,
- Revolutionary movements in Armenia 1905–1907, Yerevan, 1955.
