= Voskehask =

Village in Shirak, Armenia

Voskehask Ոսկեհասկ
- Location within Armenia Location within Shirak
- Coordinates: 40°44′18″N 43°46′33″E
- Country: Armenia
- Province: Shirak
- Municipality: Akhuryan

Population (2011)
  - Total: 1,864
- Time zone: UTC+4
  - Summer (DST): UTC+5

Voskehask (Armenian: Ոսկեհասկ) is a village in the Akhuryan Municipality of the Shirak Province of Armenia.

== Demographics ==
Historical population
Year	Pop.	±% p.a.
1886	462	—
1897	591	+2.26%
1926	1,203	+2.48%
1939	1,923	+3.67%
1959	2,093	+0.42%
1970	2,327	+0.97%
1979	2,362	+0.17%
1989	2,558	+0.80%
2001	2,231	−1.13%
2011	1,864	−1.78%
