= Antranig Chalabian =

Armenian historian (1922–2011)

Antranig Chalabian (March 11, 1922, in Kessab, Syria – April 12, 2011, in Southfield, Michigan) was a medical illustrator, cartographer and historian, an author of several volumes on Armenian history. He is best known for his biography of General Andranik Ozanyan.

== Biography ==
He was born in 1922 in Kessab, modern-day Syria. After graduating from the Armenian Evangelical School, he studied at Aleppo College. Then, in the summer of 1949, Chalabian moved to Beirut and took a position in the physiology department of the American University of Beirut (AUB). In 1977, Chalabian and his family immigrated to the Detroit, USA, where Chalabian worked as public relations director at the AGBU Alex Manoogian School.

In 1984 he published his first historical book General Andranik and the Armenian Revolutionary Movement. In 1989 at the History Department of the Yerevan State University he was awarded a doctorate in history. The book was later translated into English, Turkish, Greek and Spanish. The book became an instant best seller (75,000 copies sold only in Armenia). Academician Mkrtich G. Nersisyan called the book a "valuable historical work resulted by many years of persistent research". Chalabian is also the author of Revolutionary Figures (1991), Armenia After Coming of Islam and Dro books.

Chalabian received numerous accolades and recognition. The mayor of Southfield designated in 2005 a day as Dr. Antranig Chalabian Day in recognition of his goodwill ambassadorship of the city through his readers worldwide. He was an invited contributor to Military History Magazine, and regularly contributed articles to the Armenian publications like Spurk, Nayiri, Chanasser, Armenian Mirror-Spectator and Andranikological Review papers.

Before writing and publishing his books, Chalabian collaborated with Dr. Stanley Kerr after discovering Kerr's personal notes in the attic of the Physiology Department. Kerr had moved to New Jersey after retiring in 1965 from his distinguished career as the Chairman of the Biochemistry Department of the American University of Beirut. However, he had left his notes behind assuming that the notes were long lost through the years. Kerr had kept his notes and taken hitherto unpublished pictures while serving in Near East Relief. In 1919, Kerr was transferred to Marash, in central Anatolia, where he headed the American relief operations. The outcome of their collaborative work was the publication of Kerr's The Lions of Marash in 1973.

While collaborating with Kerr, Henry Wilfrid Glockler, a one-time controller at AUB and a neighbor of the Kerrs in Princenton, entrusted Chalabian his personal memoirs. Chalabian edited the memoirs and had it published in Beirut in 1969 by Sevan publishing house. The book is titled Interned in Turkey.
