= Musayelyan, Shirak =

Village in Shirak, Armenia

Musayelyan Մուսայելյան
- Location within Armenia Location within Shirak
- Coordinates: 40°59′34″N 43°56′20″E
- Country: Armenia
- Province: Shirak
- Municipality: Ashotsk

Population (2011)
  - Total: 388
- Time zone: UTC+4
  - Summer (DST): UTC+5

Musayelyan (Armenian: Մուսայելյան) is a village in the Ashotsk Municipality of the Shirak Province of Armenia. The St. Trdat church built in 1896 is located in the village.

== Etymology ==
The village was later renamed after Bolshevik captain Sargis Musayelyan who committed his troops and the armoured train Vardan Zoravar (Armenian: Վարդան Զորավար, lit. 'General Vardan') to the May Uprising against the Dashnak government of Armenia in Aleksandropol (Gyumri)—He was imprisoned for several months until the Red Army executed two notable Dashnaks in Zangezur, thus prompting his execution in retaliation.

== Economy ==
The population engages in animal husbandry, with the cultivation of grain and fodder crops.

== Demographics ==
The population of the village since 1873 is as follows:

Year	Population	Note
1873	274	100% Armenian
1886	326	100% Armenian
1897	366	100% Armenian Apostolic
1908	450	
1914	555	Mainly Armenian. Also recorded as 495
1916	560	
1919	600	Mainly Armenian
1922	254	100% Armenian
1926	258	100% Armenian
1931	386	100% Armenian
1939	512	
1959	469	
1970	442	
1979	408	
2001	386	
2004	395	
2011	388	
