= Nahapetavan =

Nahapetavan Նահապետավան
- Location within Armenia Location within Shirak
- Coordinates: 40°36′N 44°01′E
- Country: Armenia
- Province: Shirak
- Municipality: Artik

Population (2011)
  - Total: 1,040
- Time zone: UTC+4
  - Summer (DST): UTC+5

Nahapetavan (Armenian: Նահապետավան) is a village in the Artik Municipality of the Shirak Province of Armenia. The town was renamed in 1961 in honor of Nahapet Kurghinian, a participant in the Bolshevik uprising in May 1920.

== Demographics ==
Historical population
| Year | Pop. | ±% p.a. |
|---|---|---|
| 1873 | 293 | — |
| 1897 | 465 | +1.94% |
| 1926 | 622 | +1.01% |
| 1939 | 518 | −1.40% |
| 1959 | 647 | +1.12% |
| 1970 | 655 | +0.11% |
| 1979 | 650 | −0.09% |
| 2001 | 817 | +1.04% |
| 2011 | 1,040 | +2.44% |
