= Andranik Hakobyan (poet) =

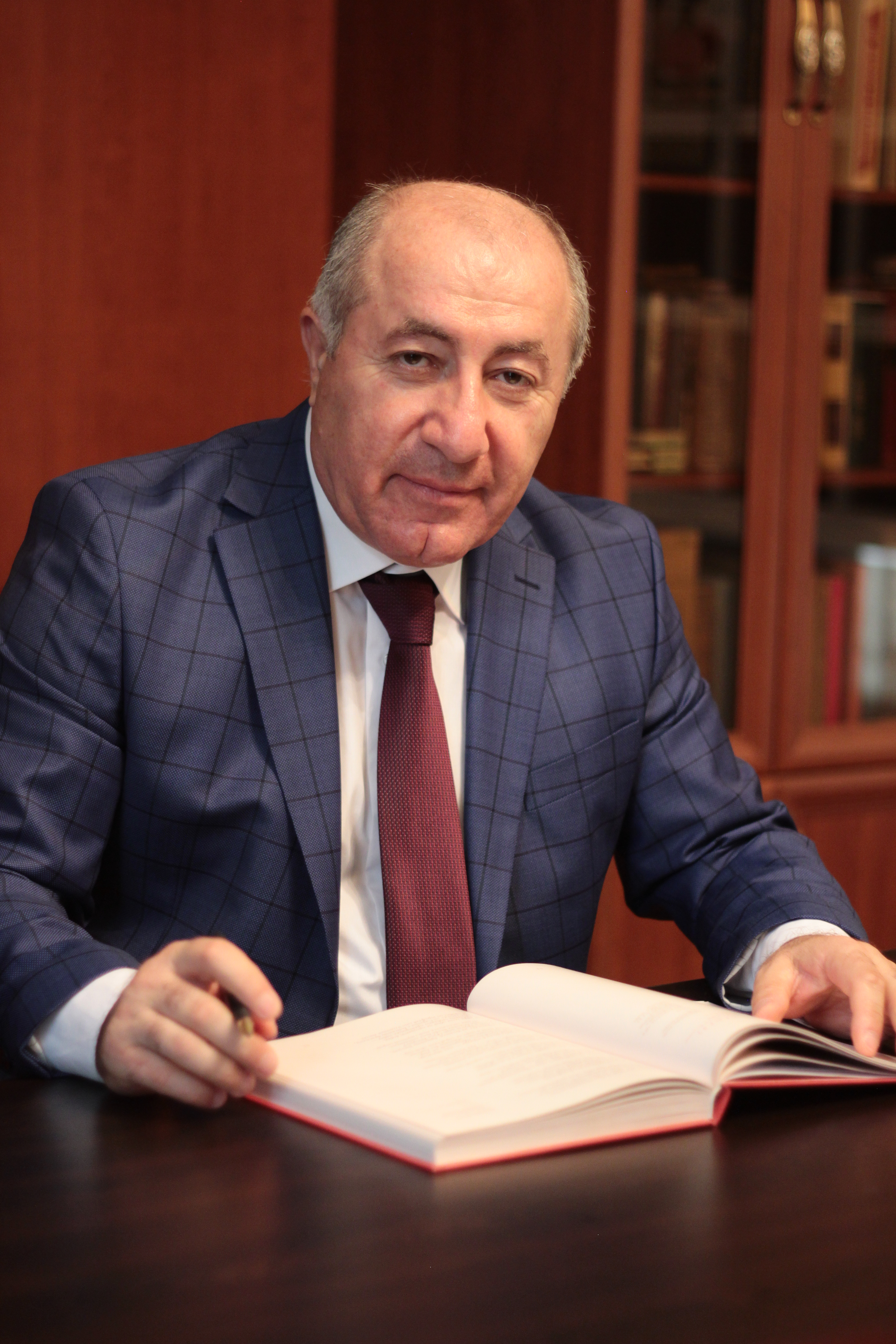
- Born: November 26, 1959 (age 66); Madina, Martuni Region, ASSR
- Education: Yerevan State University
- Occupations: poet, publicist, statesman and public figure

Andranik Hakobyan (Armenian: Անդրանիկ Հակոբյան) (born November 26, 1959, Madina, Martuni Region, ASSR) is an Armenian poet, publicist, statesman and public figure.

== Biography ==
Andranik Hakobyan was born in the village of Madina of Martuni Region. He graduated from the secondary school N.1 of Artashat, afterwards the department of philosophy and sociology of Yerevan State University. Hakobyan taught history and social sciences in schools, worked as a school supervisor in Artashat District National Educational Department, later in AKP Ararat district commissariat. In 1991-1999 he served in the Armed Forces of Armenia, from 1999 to 2004 he worked in the Government of Armenia. From 2004 to 2008 he served in the Police of Armenia. Hakobyan is the Chief Adviser of the Minister of Emergency Situations of Armenia. He has been awarded with state medals, commemorative medals. Hakobyan is the author of poems, short stories, essays, novelettes, journalistic publications.

== Bibliography of works ==
- “Alone against the wind” poems, 2001
- “Feeling hot” short stories, essays, 2004
- “The country with the blue sky” novelette, 2016
- “A talk with the mountain” short stories, essays, novelette, 2016
- “The rising sun” poems, 2017
- “A talk between three” memoirs written with Ashot
- “Vardanyan as the co-author”, 2019

== References about A. Hakobyan ==
- Roland Sharoyan “The poet who has saddled the stars” Azg, 3 April 2001
- Arevik Harutjunyan “Voice of anxiety and love” Garun, N.4, 2001
- Tevos Petrosyan “Poets’ time” Grakan Tert, 1–15 May 2001
- Martin Gilavyan “Not in spite of but in the name of” Hajastani Hanrapetutjun, N.60, 04, 07, 2001
- Anahit Tadevosyan “Time creates words” Introductory notes and translation, Novaya Vremia, N.749, 19.05.2001
- Martin Gilavyan “Poetry and time motion” Yerevan, 2003, p. 153
- Nerses Atabekyan “The planet of the strong lonely”, “World of Geghama” 4 November 2004
- Naghash Martirosyan “ Feeling hot” an open letter for the reader” thoughts instead of review, Azg, 28 January 2005
- Felix Bakhchinyan “With memories about the world of Taron” Grakan Tert, 24, 11, 2006
- Nerses Atabekyan “Tempting like mountain climbing”
- Felix Bakhchinyan “Saga about family cult” Hraparak, 16 September 2016
- Vanush Shermazanyan “Secret code of our blood”, “Trial to decipher Andranik Hakobyan’s “Country with the blue sky” after reading it without a moment's respite. On Facebook, 30 September 2016
- Felix Bakhchinyan “World of Andranik Hakobyan’s creations” Yerevan, 2017
- Petros Demirchyan “Memory the roots of which come from the depth” Grakan Tert, 3 November 2017
- Felix Bakhchinyan “The cross we have to bear” Yerevan, 2017
- Hovik Hoveyan “ Spacial charm of the nation’s silence “ Hraparak
- Arthur Andranikyan “Let’s uncover our face to our soul” Irates de facto, 24 February 2018
- Grigor Janikyan “Our How and Why”
- Hovhannes Ayvazyan “Mediations on Andranik Hakobyan’s “A talk with the mountain” and “The rising sun” collections, 2019
