= Soviet invasion of Armenia =

Russian Civil War

Red Army invasion of Armenia
- Part of the Turkish invasion of Armenia and the Southern Front of the Russian Civil War
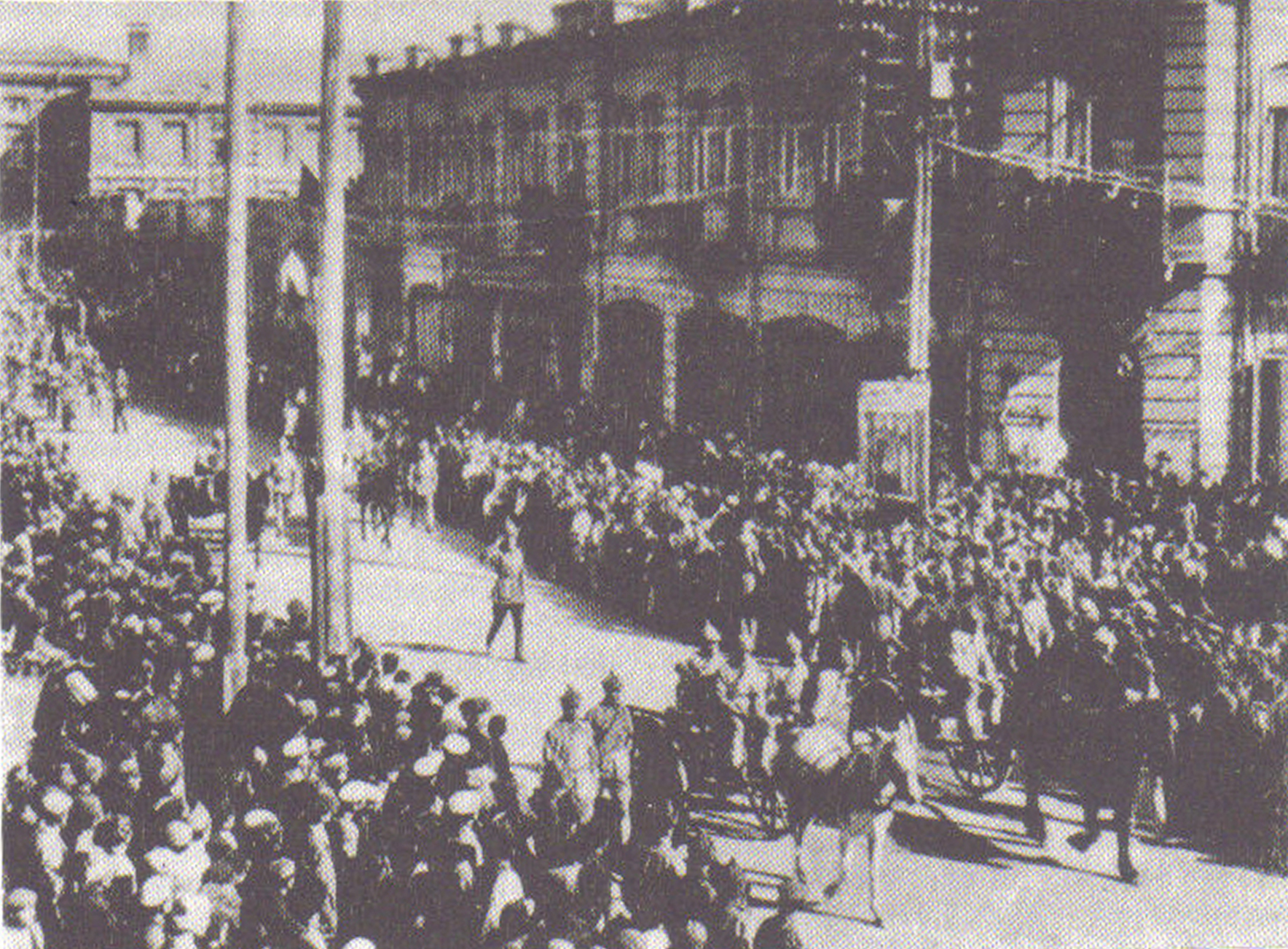
- Red Army in Yerevan, November 1920
Date	29 November – 4 December 1920 (5 days)
Location	First Republic of Armenia
Result	Soviet victory: Overthrow of ARF government and establishment of Armenian SSR

Belligerents
Russian SFSR; Azerbaijan SSR; Armenian Bolsheviks	Armenia

Casualties and losses
- ~60,000 Armenian civilian deaths in the simultaneous Turkish invasion of Armenia

The Soviet invasion of Armenia (Note: Also known as the Armenian–Soviet War, the Sovietization of Armenia, and the Soviet occupation of Armenia.) was a military campaign which was carried out by the 11th Army of Soviet Russia from 29 November to 4 December 1920 in order to install a new Soviet government in the First Republic of Armenia, a former territory of the Russian Empire. The invasion coincided with an invasion by Kemalist Turkey and anti-government insurrections organized by local Armenian Bolsheviks. The invasion led to the dissolution of the First Republic of Armenia and the establishment of the Armenian Soviet Socialist Republic. Militant resistance continued in southern Armenia under Nzhdeh's self-declared Republic of Mountainous Armenia until July 1921.

== Background ==
Following the collapse of the Ottoman and Russian Empires, Armenia declared independence in 1918. However, the new republic faced immense challenges, including refugees from the Armenian Genocide, and military threats from Azerbaijan and Turkey. By 1920, Soviet Russia was expanding its influence in the South Caucasus and viewed Armenia as strategically significant. The Armenian government, led by the Armenian Revolutionary Federation (ARF, Dashnaktsutyun) sought to negotiate with Soviet leaders to secure recognition of its sovereignty, but these negotiations coincided with Soviet geopolitical strategies and the rise of Kemalist Turkey.

The Sovietization of Armenia was influenced by Soviet support for Turkish Nationalists under Mustafa Kemal. While the Kemalists aimed to annex Western Armenia, the Soviets saw the opportunity to use their alliance with Turkey to counter Western powers and establish control over the South Caucasus.

This led to coordinated Soviet-Turkish military campaigns, including the occupation of disputed territories like Nakhichevan, Karabakh, Syunik by the Red Army between May and July 1920. These incursions, coupled with internal unrest and the suppression of a May 1920 Bolshevik uprising in Armenia, weakened the Armenian republic and left it isolated. Despite not offering to intervene, the United Kingdom advised that Armenia not make any agreements with the Soviets or the Kemalists. Simon Vratsian, the last prime minister of the First Republic of Armenia, described the crisis as being caught between the "Bolshevik hammer and the Turkish anvil."

In September 1920, Turkish forces launched an offensive, capturing Kars on 30 October and Alexandropol by 7 November 1920. Armenia subsequently signed a ceasefire on 18 November 1920.

Such a political situation inspired the Soviets and particularly Trotsky, who supported the concept of permanent revolution. In addition, the Soviets aimed to keep Armenia as a buffer between Turkey and Baku. The Soviet Congress of the Peoples of the East adopted a resolution in September 1920 calling for the Sovietization of Armenia.

== Invasion ==
On 29 November 1920 11th Army of Soviet Russia invaded Armenia and a group of Armenian Bolsheviks who came along with those army units declared Armenian Soviet Socialist Republic. On 2 December 1920 Republic of Armenia government resigned by agreement and on 4 Dec 1920 the Soviet Russian troops entered Yerevan. The Red Army continued to face military opposition only in Syunik, where Garegin Njdeh and his soldiers fought until July 1921 under the banner of the Republic of Mountainous Armenia.

After Turkey's military conquest, Armenia, under the Treaty of Alexandropol (December 2, 1920), was compelled to forfeit all claims to Western Armenia, reduce its military to a token force, and accept Turkish oversight, with Turkey assuming control over its transportation and communications, thereby reducing Armenia to a Turkish protectorate.

== Treaty between Soviet Armenia and Soviet Russia ==
On December 2, 1920, an agreement was signed by Dro and Terterian, on behalf of the government of Armenia, and Boris Legrand, on behalf of the Soviet Government on the one hand.

Its terms were as follows:

1. Armenia was declared a Soviet Socialist Republic.
2. A Provisional Military-Revolutionary Committee shall assume power over Armenia until the convention of a Congress of Soviets
3. Soviet Russia recognized the entire Yerevan province, Zangezur, part of Kars province, some regions of Kazakh province and the territories of Tiflis province as an integral part of the Republic of Armenia, which were part of the Republic of Armenia until September 28, 1920.
4. The officers of the Army of the Republic of Armenia were released from responsibility for actions initiated prior to the proclamation of Soviet power in Armenia.
5. The current members of the current Armenian political party (Dashnaktsutyun) and other social parties of the Republic of Armenia were not to be persecuted for membership in these parties.
6. The composition of the temporary ruling committee was to consist of 5 Bolsheviks and two left confederates.
7. The government of Soviet Russia was committed to ensuring the security of the territory of Soviet Armenia.

== Soviet rationale ==
According to historian Brinegar, Sovietization of Armenia was pushed by a faction of Bolsheviks including Narimanov, Joseph Stalin, and Sergo Ordzhonikidze, who considered the occupation of Armenia and Georgia necessary for stability and the elimination of anti-Bolshevik activity in border regions.

From 19 July to 7 August 1920, the 2nd World Congress of the Communist International was held. Its manifest of which stipulated the following: “In the conflict of Entente with Turkey Armenia played the same programmatic role as Belgium in the conflict with Germany, as Serbia in the conflict with Austria-Hungary. After Republic of Armenia was established – without borders and without potential to live- Wilson refused the Armenian mandate which had been offered him by League of Nations, since the soil of Armenia veils neither oil nor platinum. “Liberated” Armenia is now less protected than it has ever been.”

Additionally, Lenin feared the Entente was planning to use Georgia as a staging ground for retaking Baku, which provided oil to the Soviets.

A 1967 book published within the USSR describes the event as follows:

"On November 29, 1920, an armed uprising of the working people of Armenia, headed by the Communist Party and aided by the Russian people, put an end to the ill-famed Dashnak rule. The years of Dashnak rule (1918-20) are another grim page in the history of the Armenian people. Ceaseless warfare and massacres, anarchy contains tyranny, hunger and poverty, pillage and violence, blood and tears—those are the essential features of that period. The country was on the verge of ruin. The economy of Armenia had been greatly deranged. Gross industrial output had decreased in 1919 more than twelve fold as against 1913. Farming and animal husbandry were on the verge of disaster. Gross agricultural output in 1919 had dropped almost sixfold as compared with 1913 and crop areas had decreased more than fourfold. Under the Dashnak rule, the peasants had over 14 kinds of taxes to pay. Hunger and poverty gave rise to frequent epidemics. Armenia became a Soviet state, ruled by the working people—the workers and the peasants."

== See also ==
- List of states and regions involved in the Russian Civil War
- Bibliography of the Russian Revolution and Civil War
- Outline of the Russian Revolution and Civil War
- Turkish–Armenian War
- May uprisings
