= Toulmin =

Toulmin is a surname and given name. Notable people with the name include:

- Evelyn Toulmin (1877–1945), Anglo-Argentine cricketer
- George Toulmin (1857–1923), British journalist, newspaper proprietor, and politician
- George Hoggart Toulmin (1754–1817), English physician and geological thinker
- Harry Toulmin (Unitarian minister) (1766–1823), son of Joshua Toulmin; served as president of Transylvania Seminary, Kentucky Secretary of State, and U.S. federal judge in Alabama
- Harry Aubrey Toulmin, Sr. (1858–1942), American lawyer
- Harry Theophilus Toulmin (1838–1916), U.S. federal judge
- Joshua Toulmin (1740–1815), British theologian
- Joshua Toulmin Smith (1816–1869), British political theorist, lawyer, and historian
- Lucy Toulmin Smith (1838–1911), Anglo-American antiquarian and librarian
- Stephen Toulmin (1922–2009), British philosopher, author, and educator
- Theophilus Toulmin Garrard (1812–1902), American politician and Civil War Union general
- Toulmin Smith, the surname of Lucy and Joshua Toulmin Smith
- Vaness Toulmin (born 1967), British academic specialising in popular culture

== See also ==
- Toulmin method, a method of reasoning devised by Stephen Toulmin
