= Çeşməbasar =

- Municipality
- Location within Azerbaijan
- Coordinates: 39°07′32″N 45°31′05″E
- Country: Azerbaijan
- Autonomous republic: Nakhchivan
- District: Babek

Population (2005)
  - Total: 909
- Time zone: UTC+4 (AZT)

Çeşməbasar (also, Cheshmabasar and Cheshmasara) is a village and municipality in the Babek District of Nakhchivan, Azerbaijan. It is located in the left side of the Nakhchivan-Ordubad highway, 8 km from the district center, on the plain. Its population is busy with grain-growing and animal husbandry. There are secondary school, club, library and mosque in the village. It has a population of 909.

== Etymology ==
Çeşməbasar - is located on the Araz plain. Until the beginning of the 19th century, the area of the village was the planting area of the village of Güznüt. Çeşməbasar (Cheshmabasar) means "place which covered with water". Local residents say that the actual name of the village was Çeşməsara (Cheshmasara). Made from the words of Çeşmə (spring) and sara (net, pure), this geographical name means as "pure water" and explained by the fact that in the past, the surrounding area were many carbonate springs.

== Notable Natives ==
- Fəttah Heydərov - Deputy of the Azerbaijan Parliament, the vice-chairman of the Regional Policy Committee of Azerbaijan Parliament.
- Kamaladdin Heydarov - Minister of Emergency Situations of Azerbaijan, Colonel general, the President of the Taekwondo and Boxing Federations, vice-president of the World Taekwondo Federation.
- Tale Heydarov - Chairman of "The European - Azerbaijan Society" and president of FC Gabala.
