= Toulmin Smith =

Toulmin Smith is a surname. Notable people with the surname include:

- Joshua Toulmin Smith (1816–1869), British political theorist, lawyer, and historian
- Lucy Toulmin Smith (1838–1911), American-born editor and librarian, daughter of Joshua
