= Colin Mooers =

Canadian political scientist

Colin Mooers (born July 21, 1954) is a Canadian political theorist, author, and Professor Emeritus in the Department of Politics and Public Administration at Toronto Metropolitan University (formerly Ryerson University). His work focuses on Marxist theory, imperialism, citizenship, and the political economy of capitalism. He is best known for his books The Making of Bourgeois Europe (1991), The New Imperialists: Ideologies of Empire (2006), and Imperial Subjects: Citizenship in an Age of Crisis and Empire (2014).

== Early life and education ==
Mooers was born in Fredericton, New Brunswick where he attended high school and completed his first two years of university at the University of New Brunswick.

Mooers completed a Bachelor of Arts (Honours) in Philosophy at the University of Ottawa, followed by a Master of Arts in Philosophy from the University of Toronto. He completed his PhD in Social and Political Thought at York University in Canada.

== Academic career ==
Mooers joined the Department of Politics and Public Administration at Ryerson University in 1987, where he served as Chair from 2001 to 2006 and as Interim Chair in 2011–2012. He was also affiliated with the York-Ryerson Joint Graduate Program in Communication and Culture, serving as Graduate Director for Ryerson's MA and PhD programs from 2006 to 2011. He retired from university teaching in 2019.

== Research and publications ==
Mooers’ research explores the intersections of capitalism, imperialism, citizenship, and social movements. His scholarship is grounded in critical Marxist theory and critiques of neoliberal globalization.

His 2014 book, Imperial Subjects: Citizenship in an Age of Crisis and Empire, examines how neoliberal globalization reshapes citizenship into a form of imperial subjectivity, where market forces dominate social rights. The book received critical acclaim for its analysis of global capitalism and resistance movements, particularly in Latin America.

In 2006, Mooers edited The New Imperialists: Ideologies of Empire, a collection critiquing the ideological justifications for contemporary imperialism and the US-led invasions of Afghanistan and Iraq. His own contributions in the volume include essays challenging revisionist histories of empire, such as his critique of Niall Ferguson’s portrayal of British imperialism.

His first major work, The Making of Bourgeois Europe (1991), offers a comparative historical analysis of the rise of capitalism in England, France, and Germany, defending the concept of bourgeois revolution.

Mooers has also written extensively for publications such as Jacobin and The Nation, often collaborating with journalist Kurt Hackbarth. Their articles analyze political developments in Mexico under President Andrés Manuel López Obrador (AMLO), focusing on issues such as sovereignty, neoliberalism, indigenous, and class politics.

== Selected publications ==
=== Books ===
- The Making of Bourgeois Europe: Absolutism, Revolution and the Rise of Capitalism in England, France and Germany (Verso, 1991)
- The New Imperialists: Ideologies of Empire (Editor; Oneworld Publications, 2006)
- Imperial Subjects: Citizenship in an Age of Crisis and Empire (Bloomsbury Academic, 2014)

=== Selected articles and essays ===
- “AMLO’s First One Hundred Days” (with Kurt Hackbarth), Jacobin, March 19, 2019
- “The Zapatista Revolution is Not Over,” The Nation, September 19, 2019.
- “Multiculturalism and the Fetishism of Difference,” Socialist Studies, Vol. 1, No. 2 (2005)
- “The New Fetishism: Citizenship and Finance Capital,” Studies in Political Economy, No. 66 (2001)
