= Hayk Asatryan =

Armenian political theorist (1900–1956)

Haik Asatrian
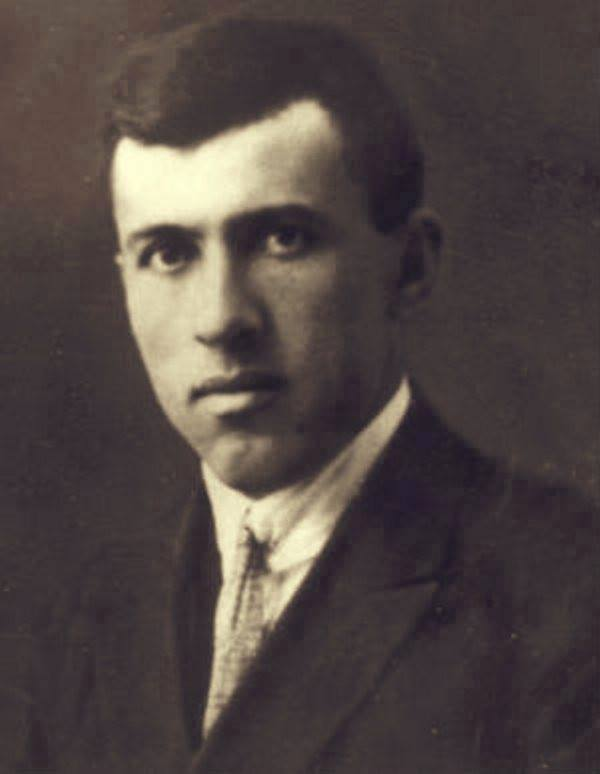
- Born: 5 February 1900; Alashkert, Ottoman Empire
- Died: 13 January 1956 (aged 55); Sofia, Bulgaria
- Occupation: Philosopher

Hayk Asatryan (Armenian: Հայկ Ասատրյան; 5 February 1900 – 13 January 1956) was an Armenian political theorist, an associate and close friend of Garegin Nzhdeh, and one of the founders of Tseghakronism and Taronism. He authored several books and articles on the history of Armenia.

== Biography ==
Asatryan was born in Alashkert. During his school years, he joined the Armenian Revolutionary Federation and published the party's newspaper Shant in Yerevan from 1918 to 1919. He participated in the 1921 February Uprising, and then settled in Bulgaria and Romania. He later studied in the Department of Philosophy at the University of Prague, graduating in 1930 with the title of Doctor of Philosophical Sciences.

He remained engaged in ARF party activities and was a member of the ARF Central Committee. Due to disagreements with his colleagues, Asatryan left the party in 1935. He worked closely with Garegin Nzhdeh and together they founded the ideology of Tseghakronism. Asatryan co-edited the Razmik and Eagle Taron newspapers with Nzhdeh from 1937 to 1944 in Bulgaria. In 1942, he published the book Armenia - Aryan Outpost in Western Asia in Armenian and German. This book was meant to prove the Indo-European origin of the Armenian people, amid propaganda in the German press that Armenians were of Semitic origin and to be exterminated.

In 1944, he was arrested by Soviet soldiers in Bulgaria and transferred to prison, while his family was exiled to Pavlikeni. He was granted amnesty in 1955 and died a year later in Sofia from a heart attack.
