= Tseghakronism =

Armenian ideology

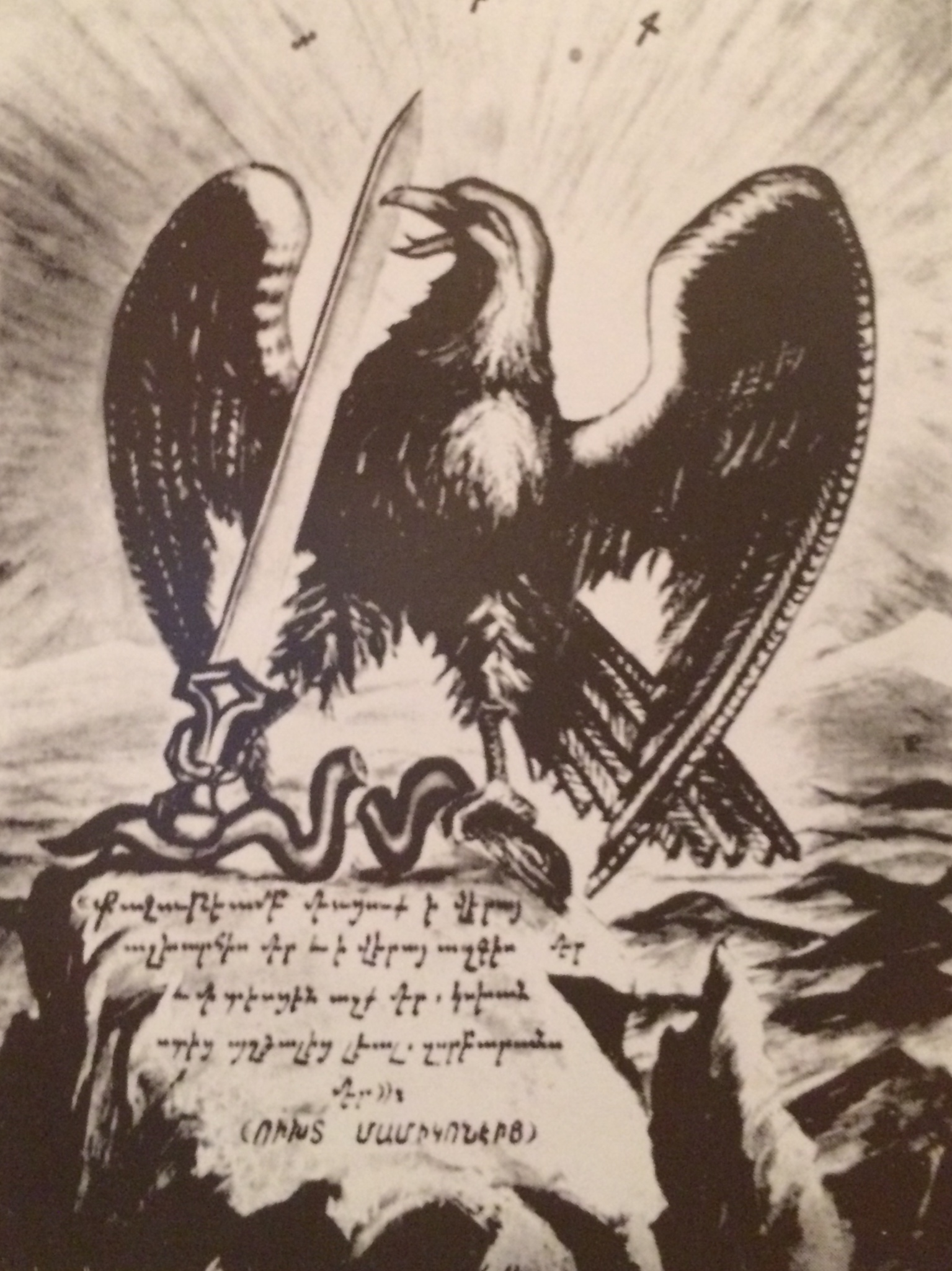
The Eagle of Taron as a symbol of Tseghakronism

Tseghakronism (Armenian: Ցեղակրոնութիւն, romanized: Ts’eghakronut’yun) is a national, political and ethnic ideology aimed at the renewal of the spiritual, behavioral and cultural identity of the Armenian people. Its goal is to unite Armenians within a single state on the territory of their historical homeland. The movement emerged in the 1930s under the leadership of Garegin Nzhdeh, who argued that racial identity occupied a central place in Armenian national consciousness. Together with his associates Hayk Asatryan and Nerses Astvatsaturyan, Tseghakronism was later further developed into Taronism (Armenian: Տարոնականութիւն, romanized: Taronakanut’yun), which continued and refined its ideological foundations.

The symbol of Tseghakronism is the Eagle of Taron, representing independence, strength, resilience, and the determination of the Armenian people to preserve their cultural identity, especially in times of adversity.

Tseghakronism Day is officially observed on January 14, commemorating the establishment in Bulgaria of the first Tseghakron oaths by Garegin Nzhdeh and members of the Organization of Tseghakron Oaths of Bulgaria.

== Origin and interpretation of the term ==
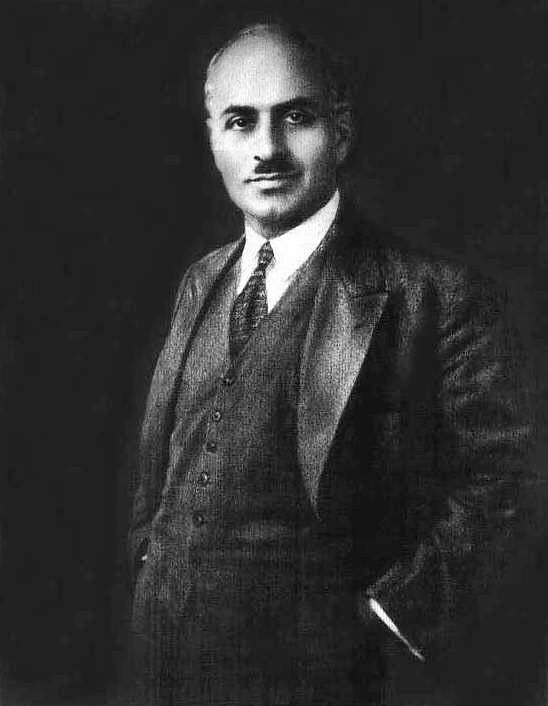
Founder of Tseghakronism Garegin Nzhdeh

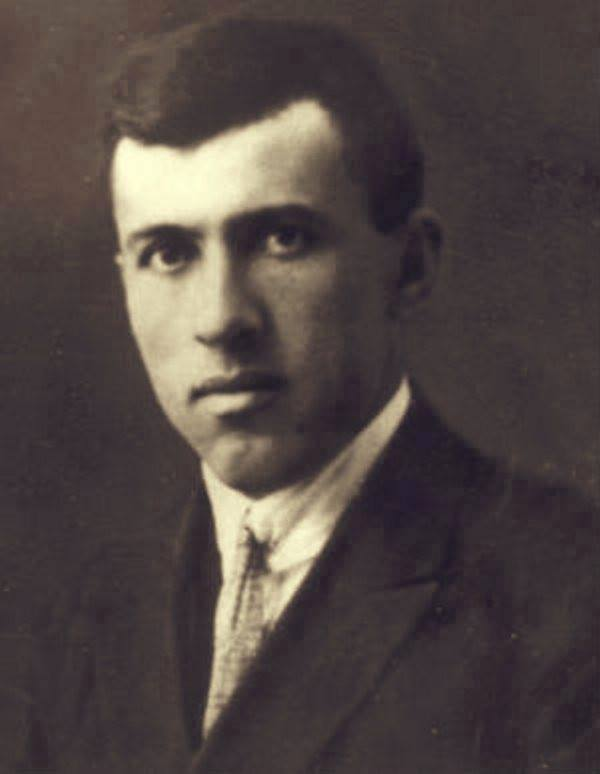
Founder of Tseghakronism Hayk Asatryan

The term "Tseghakronism", as well as the ideology itself, was coined by Garegin Nzhdeh. The word "tsegh-a-kron" was formed by combining two nouns:

- tsegh (Armenian: ցեղ, romanized: ts’egh) (nation/race), and
- kron (Armenian: կրոն, romanized: kron) (religion).

For Nzhdeh, the concept of "tsegh" is broader than the definition provided by anthropology.

In general, according to Nzhdeh, "it is difficult to define it in scientific language; one can only speak of relative scientificity". He considered existing terminology insufficient to encompass the full depth of the nation. According to his formulation, "the nation is more spirit than clay" (that is, matter). He further regarded the nation as primordial, existing since the beginning of creation.

To be Tseghakron, according to Nzhdeh, means to carry the nation within the individual – its qualities and moral values – and to embody everything nationally Armenian throughout the entirety of Armenian history. The root of the word "kron" (religion) is "to carry", and Armenian contains other words of this type, such as hogekron (spirit-bearing), khachakron (cross-bearing), molekron (fanatical), nyutakron (material-oriented), makrakron (pure), khstakron (strict), and kusakron (celibate).

Tseghakronism is presented as encompassing both nationalism and patriotism. For this reason, Nzhdeh preferred the term "Tseghakronism" over expressions such as "love of nation" or "patriotism".

== History ==
=== Conditions for formation ===
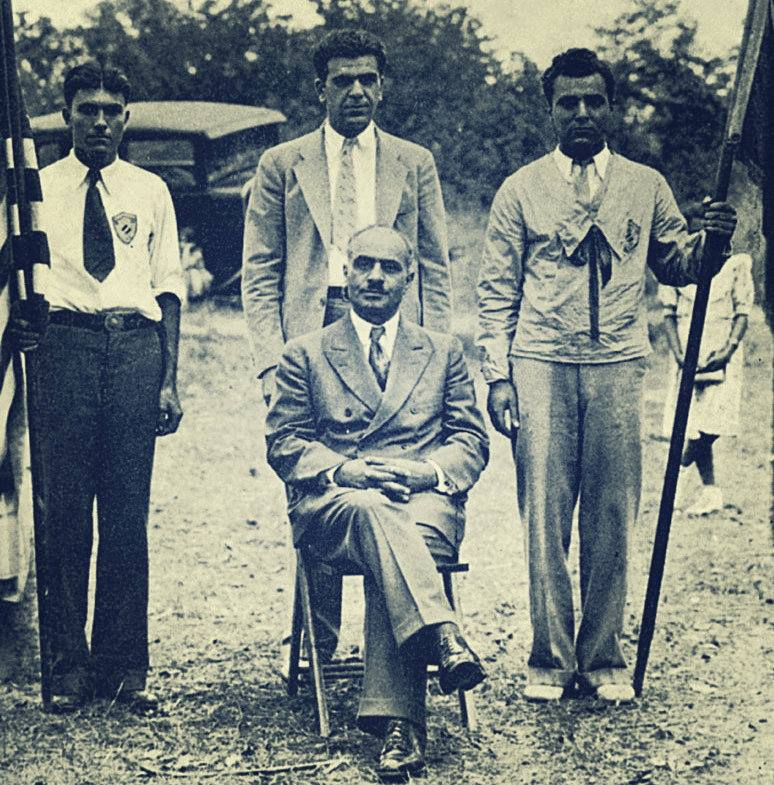
Nzhdeh, Tigran Muradyan, and young activists of the "Tseghakron Oaths" in the United States

- 1. The 1930s were a period in which a defeatist mindset prevailed among the Armenian diaspora. Combined with divisive inter-party conflicts and the influence of a corrupting foreign environment, this led Armenians abroad to passively accept their degraded condition, threatening to make the defeat at the beginning of the century permanent.
- 2. This situation was further exacerbated by a form of extreme religiosity: a number of anti-national sects operated within Armenian diaspora communities, preaching renunciation of the idea of the homeland, withdrawal from national and social life, and devotion to a "heavenly homeland." Such conditions risked leading to the fragmentation of nearly one million Armenians in the diaspora, making intervention necessary.
- 3. The movement was also driven by anti-Armenian propaganda carried out by the Turks, who employed European public figures to portray Armenians as unpatriotic, cowardly, incapable of resistance, anarchic, and morally deficient. Countering these misrepresentations through both propaganda and practical action was considered essential.
- 4. In addition, as Nzhdeh writes, "there was yet another major factor underscoring the necessity of the Tseghakron movement: the political appeasement of our older generation toward Turkey. Our traditional parties had begun to abandon the Armenian Question and to accept the idea that Armenian territories remaining in Turkey should be relinquished and that rapprochement with the Turks was necessary. Such renunciation, in the eyes of the younger generation, would render us a contemptible people

It was therefore necessary to instill among the stateless Armenian diaspora a sense of ownership of the homeland, rescuing it from "spiritual and political homelessness" and transforming it into a nation possessing a homeland.

- 5. At the same time, the Tseghakron movement sought to establish a strong spiritual defense against Bolshevik propaganda, which was spreading widely throughout Armenian diaspora communities.

=== Ideological origins of Tseghakronism ===
Tseghakronism did not emerge in an ideological vacuum. It was preceded by the national ideas of Ghevond Alishan, Raffi, Raphael Patkanian, Daniel Varoujan, Avetis Aharonyan, and others. However, while they contributed ideas, they did not formulate a coherent ideology. It was Garegin Nzhdeh who synthesized and systematized existing Armenian national thought, thereby laying the foundation for the doctrine of Tseghakronism.

=== Davitbekian Oaths ===
The ideas of Tseghakronism did not originate in the diaspora but were brought from Armenia, where they had been put into practice and tested in the mountains during 1919–1921 in the form of the Davitbekian Oath. As Nzhdeh writes, "in the form of our Davitbekian national-preserving oaths, Tseghakronism acted and triumphed in 1920."

=== Formation of Tseghakronism (1932–1937) ===
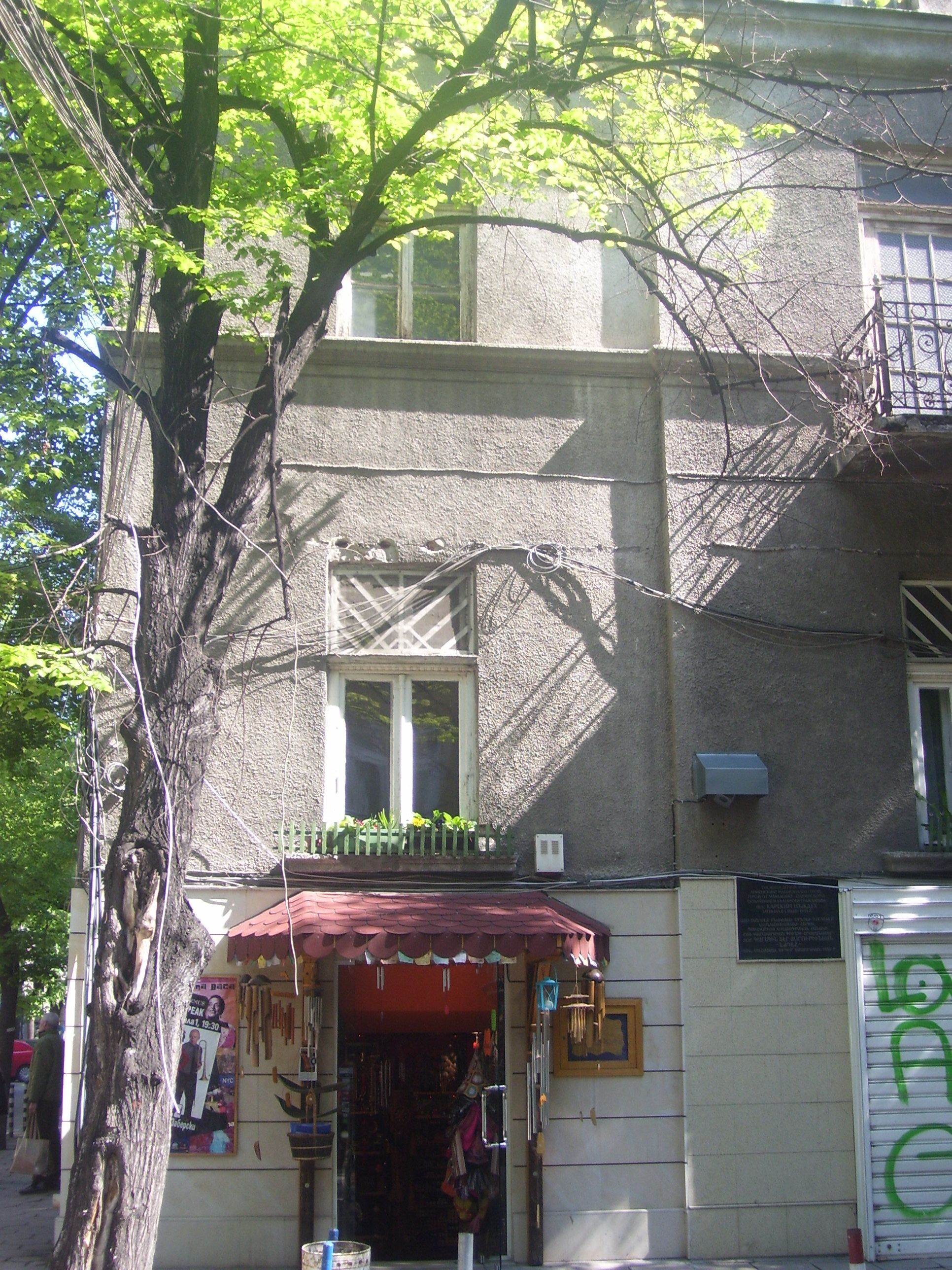
Nzhdeh's house in Sofia

In 1932, in the magazine "Khrovk" published in Sofia, Garegin Nzhdeh published the foundational article "Tseghakronism as a Power of Victory" under the heading "Problems of Spiritual Renewal," in which he wrote:

"If until now our people have only received blows and are tragically unable to strike back – the reason is that they do not live nationally… Tseghakronism – this is the remedy, without which Armenians will remain the most politically impoverished part of humanity."

In the summer of 1933, by decision of the ARF 12th General Assembly, Nzhdeh departed for the United States, where the largest segment of the Armenian diaspora resided and where assimilation pressures were strongest. It was there that the Tseghakron movement took shape. To develop it, he founded the Tseghakron Oaths, whose "Program-Statute" defined the organization's goal as: "To create a Tseghakron generation whose members live and act as servants and warriors of the nation, wherever they may be and whatever their social position…"

Prior to Nzhdeh’s arrival, several Armenian youth organizations were active in the United States, such as "Hayordik" and "Sons of Armenia." Nzhdeh undertook the task of uniting these separate groups and expanding the Tseghakron movement, outlining its ideology in late 1933 in the Boston daily "Hairenik" through a series of articles titled "National Awakening."

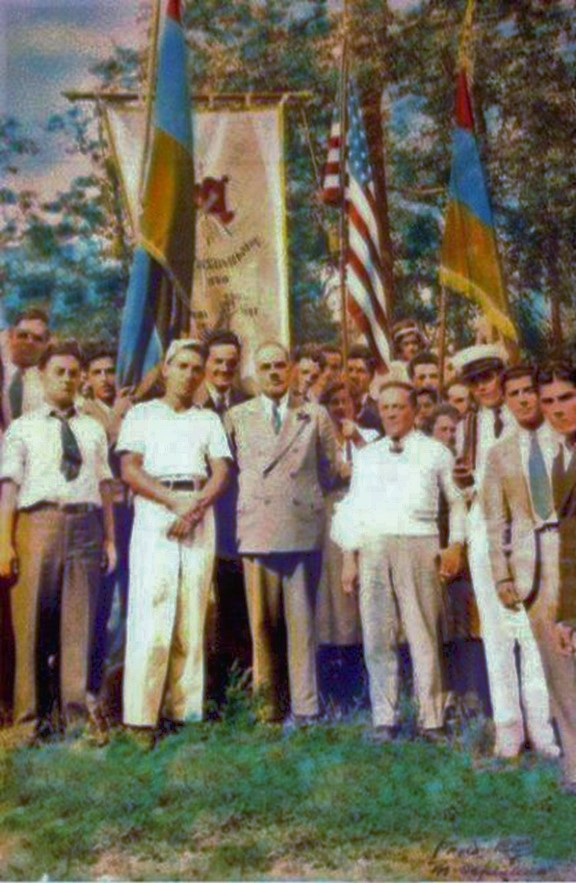
Nzhdeh with co-founders of the Tseghakron movement in Boston, 1933

The timing of the movement was significant, as the world was experiencing an unprecedented rise in nationalist movements, leading to new conflicts. It was considered necessary to prepare psychologically for impending crises by emphasizing national values. The movement aimed to become a pan-Armenian youth movement and to establish the Tseghakron Oaths as the core organization of the new Armenian generation worldwide.

Thanks to Nzhdeh's exceptional organizational and propagandistic abilities, the movement quickly gained momentum. As Ruben Darbinyan noted, "without the enthusiasm inspired by Nzhdeh, without his driving force, and without the compelling influence of his personality, it is doubtful that our new American-Armenian generation could have organized itself in such a short time". Through Tseghakronism, many Armenian-American youth overcame the psychological aftermath of the Genocide and began to take pride in their Armenian identity.

The first representative assembly of the Tseghakron Oaths was convened in July 1933. For about a year, the organization operated on a neutral, non-partisan basis. In June 1934, at the "Hairenik" Club in Boston, the first Delegate Assembly, presided over by Nzhdeh, decided to align with the ARF, after which the organization became known as the "ARF Tseghakron Oaths".

=== Further development of Tseghakronism (from 1937) ===
Following the departure of Garegin Nzhdeh and Hayk Asatryan from the Dashnaktsutyun, the Tseghakron movement began to decline. The ARF Tseghakron Oaths in America, having become party-affiliated, could no longer function as a pan-Armenian platform, creating the need for a new movement.

At the same time, Tseghakronism left several questions related to spirituality and creation unanswered, necessitating further theoretical development. The Armenian Apostolic Church maintained an indifferent or at times critical stance toward the movement, despite its significant influence in diaspora life. As a result, it became necessary to develop a more comprehensive national worldview that could unify all segments of Armenian society, including the Church, with the expectation that it might embrace the spiritual doctrine of Taronism. Otherwise, according to Nzhdeh, "a Church occupied with dead rituals and burials will ultimately bury its people and its God".

The core of the new movement emerged primarily from the Tseghakron organization in Bulgaria, led by Garegin Nzhdeh, Hayk Asatryan, and Nerses Astvatsatryan. From 1937 in Plovdiv, they published the newspaper "Razmik", where writings on the ideology of Taronism began to appear.

Finally, in April 1938 in Sofia, the Taron-Turuberan Compatriotic Union began publishing the monthly "Eagle of Taron," edited by Hayk Asatryan (with Nerses Astvatsatryan as managing director), marking the beginning of the Taronist movement.

== Aims and ideology ==
Tseghakronism is constructed according to the following logical sequence:

"I know my nation, I believe in my nation, I worship my nation, I am a Tseghakron."

Tseghakronism begins with knowledge of the nation – an understanding of its history, culture, way of life, its values and virtues, its present condition and aspirations, as well as recognition of the significant contribution made by the Armenian nation to world civilization. Knowledge of the nation also includes awareness of its shortcomings, and Tseghakronism represents an attempt at national reconstruction. Tseghakronism derives individual self-knowledge from national self-knowledge, since to know oneself, a person must first know the collective that gave them birth – that is, the nation – whose general characteristics shape the individual's identity.

From knowledge of the nation arises faith in the nation – that is, belief in the strength, genius, will, and capabilities of the Armenian nation, as well as in its future and eternity.

To believe in the nation means to heed its voice, to communicate with it, to partake in its strength and genius, its suffering and joy, its misfortunes and achievements – that is, to be in communion with the nation. This communion implies the will, in moments of danger, to hear the voice – the roar – of the nation and to follow it. To partake in the nation also means to define one's own happiness and freedom through it.

=== Two principles of Tseghakronism ===
Tseghakronism is based on two fundamental principles:

1. We are, first and foremost, responsible for our own misfortunes.
2. We must seek within ourselves the strength that we need.

=== The Creed of Tseghakronism ===
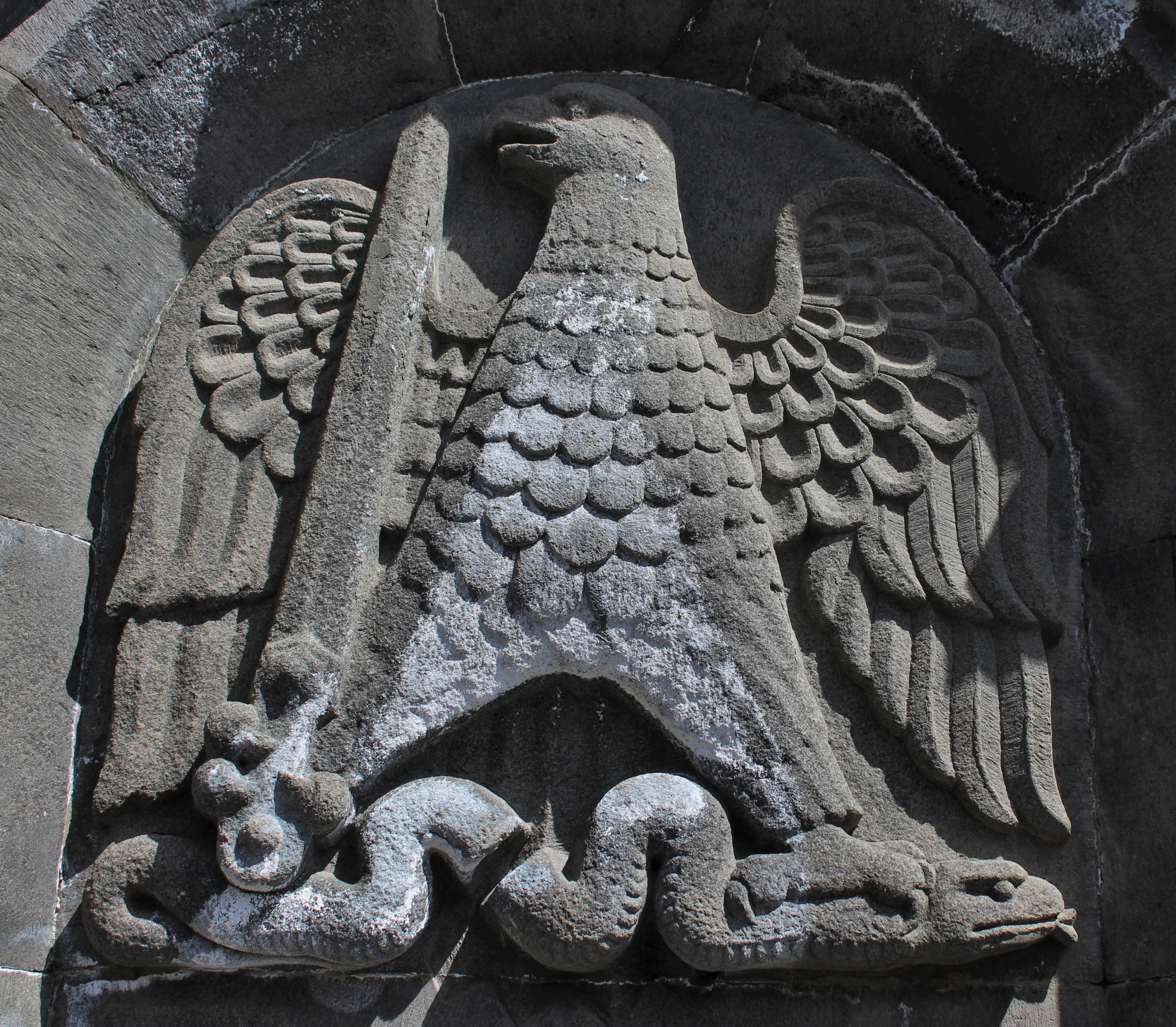
The coat of arms of Tseghakron ideology engraved on a spring located within the Geghard Monastery complex.

Nzhdeh presented the creed of Tseghakronism in his book American Armenians: The Nation and Its Takanq, where he outlined 27 points. The organization Tseghakron Oaths accepted as members Armenian men and women who adhered to this creed.

- A. I am a Tseghakron – and I swear upon the right hand of Vahagn never to sin against my oath – to live, act, and die as a Tseghamard (man of the nation).
- B. For me, the highest act of individuality and freedom is obedience to my nation.
- C. I am conscious of my nation, and thus I know that my nation is great, that it has given more to humanity than it has received; I know that the latest Armenian revolution is not the final expression of my nation's essence; I know what my nation is capable of.
- D. I am faithful to my nation, and thus I revere another divinity – the blood of my nation, in whose purity lies its future.
- E. I am spiritually united with my nation, and thus I feel that I belong more to my supreme progenitor – my nation – than to my immediate parents.
- F. I bear the duty of engaging with the political fate of my people, and thus I struggle for a great destiny worthy of my nation.
- G. To be a Tseghakron means that wherever I may be, whatever my social status, I will enthusiastically remain a servant and warrior of my nation.
- H. Outside Armenia, in the diaspora, regardless of my condition – whether wealthy, well-off, or a day laborer – I shall not consider my life in exile as irreversible. No – there is return.
- I. I profess that my generation bears a greater responsibility than the preceding generation of liberation; in this duty, my share as a Tseghakron is the lion's share – the greatest.
- J. The Tseghakron, whose motto is "more, ever more strength," reveres the military power of his nation.
- K. I am devoted to sacrifice, and thus I reverently honor those whose veneration is eternal – those who, lion-born in their courage, became godlike through their magnificent devotion, who shed their blood to eternalize the existence and honor of our nation.
- L. The Tseghakron also seeks happiness – to see how the strength of his people grows and Armenia expands justly.
- M. A people lives, creates, and endures through its nationhood. In human culture, national identity is a force of power; therefore, the corruption of national individuality is regarded by the Tseghakron as a crime against humanity and, in particular, against his own people.
- N. The Tseghakron rejects all doctrines and movements that seek to distance the younger generation from the nourishing "milk" of the nation.

He rejects all forces active in Armenian reality which, though socially opposed, unite psychologically against enlightened nationalism.
More plainly: of the two forms of nationalism – individualistic nationalism and egoistic self-interest – the Tseghakron embraces the former, which is the just and productive striving of the national individual to remain faithful to the spirit of his nation, to perfect his historical type, and to defend the freedom of his collective identity.
This aspiration fully corresponds to the highest principles of universal morality and progress.

- O. Great is my hatred, as great as my devotion. The enemies of my nation are the Turk, the Bolshevik, and their Armenian-serving agents under any name or disguise, whom I shall resolutely oppose with my powerful nationalism.

– For me, the ultimate question is: what of the Turk who has brought misfortune?
– I reject Bolshevism because it is anti-human. I hate it thrice because it is anti-Armenian, equal to the Turk; because it entered Armenia allied with the Turk; and because to this day it has been exploited by the gravedigger of my nation – the Turk, and the Turk alone.
Anti-national Bolshevism has its slogan of renunciation:
I – my resolute “yes” to my nation.
It has its formula of impotence:
I – my daily labor of liberation for my nation.
Bolshevism is markedly negative and spiritually faceless.
The Tseghakron presents himself to humanity with a nationally marked identity.

- P. Defeatism, passive suffering, a psychology of fear, lamentation, intellectual powerlessness, religious otherworldliness, class and neighborly selfishness – all these are rejected by the Tseghakron.
- Q. To be a Tseghakron means I must, I will, I can surpass – and must surpass – the enemies of my nation, first and foremost the Turk.
- R. As a worshipper of strength, the Tseghakron knows neither weakness nor retreat. Within him lives the thirst for strength, the sweetness of sacrifice, and the effort to concentrate the forces of the nation.

Following the greatness of his Artaxiad ancestors, he reveres his nation and strives everywhere to represent it worthily.

- S. Sacred to him is the day of the modern political existence of the Armenian people – May 28 – and the sacred tricolor it symbolizes, which is at once a sanctity, a political cause, and a testament.
- T. The Tseghakron speaks Armenian with Armenians, for he understands that the death of a language accelerates the spiritual death of a people.
- U. The Tseghakron is not free to engage in self-destruction.

He who holds the fate of future generations has both the right and the duty to be physically and morally sound.

- V. He prefers those sciences, arts, and crafts that can serve the power and victory of his nation. The Tseghakron is a warrior – or prepares to become one.
- W. By cultivating personal will, the Tseghakron contributes to the magnification of the Armenian spirit.

The deification of the nation’s will – this is what he strives for.
To that immortal will, which did not perish under the blows of harsh centuries and did not allow the martial spirit of the Mamikonians to die among Armenians, the Tseghakron resolutely says: yes, and amen.

=== Tseghakronism and the Individual ===
Tseghakronism requires from the individual an unbreakable unity with his nation, recognizing it as the supreme progenitor. In this sense, Tseghakronism views the family as a means for strengthening the nation and holds that the children of a family belong more to the nation – the supreme parent – than to their immediate parents.

Tseghakronism defines the individual’s desired happiness through the collective prosperity of the nation, namely "to see how the strength of one’s people grows and Armenia expands justly".

According to Tseghakronism, the highest expression of an individual's freedom and self-realization – "the supreme act" – is obedience to the nation. In other words, the individual is free insofar as he does not oppose the interests of the nation and does not harm its moral order; his self-expression must not turn into anti-national egoism.

As a moral doctrine that instills faith in the future of the nation, Tseghakronism does not preach powerless fatalism; rather, it obliges individuals to forge, through struggle, the great destiny worthy of the nation.

Tseghakronism considers faith in the nation, national devotion, and national pride to be meaningless if they remain abstract, empty rhetoric and are not manifested in real life and individual behavior. Recognizing the values and moral code of the nation must be accompanied by embodying them – living by them – thus ensuring harmony between thought, speech, and action. To live by the nation's aspirations, values, and moral code, and to make them a way of life, means to carry the nation within the individual – that is, to be a bearer of the nation, a Tseghakron.

=== The Three Types of Armenians According to Tseghakronism ===
Tseghakronism divides Armenians into three psychological-conscious categories: the national-ethnic (the tsegh), the wavering or uncommitted (the people), and the degraded, anti-national element the (the takanq(Armenian: տականք, romanized: takank')).

According to Tseghakronism, contemporary Armenians predominantly appear as the Armenian people, that is, a collection of individuals possessing certain Armenian characteristics. Only a very small portion of Armenians, in terms of their level of consciousness and way of life, are regarded as the Armenian tsegh (ethnos). Another segment constitutes the takanq.

The ideal archetype of the national individual (tseghamard, i.e., man of the nation) is the Tseghakron.

=== The Tseghakron ===
The Tseghakron is the ideal archetype of the national Armenian individual (tseghamard). A Tseghakron does not fear the corrupting influence of the environment, as he believes it powerless to assimilate him if he lives in accordance with his national essence. The Tseghakron despises cowardice. It is no coincidence that in the Tseghakron Oaths the phrase "do not be afraid" was strictly forbidden, since, in the Tseghakron understanding, telling someone to fear implies insulting them.

The Tseghakron recognizes as enemies the Turk, the Bolshevik, and their Armenian-serving agents. He rejects all movements, religions, and doctrines that deny the necessity of nations.

The Tseghakron possesses an absolute will to die for the nation and the homeland. Sacred to him are the idea of national independence and the tricolor flag that symbolizes it. He understands that the true independence of the homeland is achieved through blood and sacrifice.

The Tseghakron has the duty to form a family with a fellow member of his nation and to have offspring, recognizing that procreation ensures the continuation of the nation. He is not merely a practitioner of science, art, or craft, but an indefatigable warrior striving to place all these in service of his nation.

The Tseghakron is obedient to the nation, which he loves more than his own life. The will of the nation is his supreme command – the will for the nation's victory and endurance.

"The Tseghakron speaks little, because he is a man of action." He does not engage in empty talk and speaks only "to learn and to teach, and learns and teaches in order to act". The Tseghakron is also a propagator; the primary aim of his advocacy is to find new adherents, and it is expressed chiefly through personal example.

- 1. The Tseghamard (the tsegh)

The nation (tsegh) is the elite – the very essence – of Armenians, whose supreme goal is the perpetuation of its kind in the homeland. It is the bearer of Armenian identity and the transmitter of it to future generations. For the nation, the homeland is irreplaceable, and its independence is as necessary as oxygen. It is the nation that fights and sacrifices itself to preserve Armenian honor.

- 2. The People

The people are the uncommitted, wavering segment of Armenians. They are inclined toward the crowd, especially when they heed the voice of the takanq more than that of the nation. The people live for the present, whereas the nation lives for eternity – the former with the concerns of the day, the latter with the memory of the past, firm faith in the future, and continuous struggle in the present.

The people are guided by partial interests, while the nation is guided by pan-Armenian interests. The people are a mixture of classes, confessions, and parties, whereas within the nation there are no ruling or subordinate classes, no religious denominations or political divisions – there are only Armenians.

The people appeal for justice and the right to live, while the nation conquers and establishes them. The people may reconcile themselves to an inglorious condition, whereas the nation does not tolerate the chains of slavery and considers harmful global decisions subject to revision. In moments of danger, the people fall into confusion and panic, while the nation instinctively finds a way out. The people are unable to foresee danger, whereas the nation anticipates it.

The people glorify mediocrity, while the nation honors only its geniuses. "The people produce scribes, while the nation produces prophets".

The people do not know how to preserve values or honor heroes: today they elevate someone, tomorrow they trample them, or destroy yesterday’s sacred values through blind mass behavior. The nation is the eternal bearer of its values and perpetuates the veneration of its sacred dead.

The people suffer from a sense of inferiority, while the nation is filled with pride and determination. “The people adopt foreign culture by denationalizing themselves, while the nation nationalizes what it adopts”.

The greater the proportion of the nation within Armenians, the more they live nationally, and the stronger and more viable they are as a nation. This proportion must be increased at the expense of the people – by transforming and orienting them toward the nation. Thus, the primary aim of Tseghakronism is to transform the Armenian people into a nation.

- 3. The Takanq

The takanq are the denationalized element of Armenians, the internal enemy of the nation, harnessed to the war machine of the external enemy – faceless as Armenians and contemptible as human beings. They bear no responsibilities toward the Armenian people, yet constantly speak of rights.

They possess no true national identity, and if they speak Armenian, it is only because they have not yet found another means of communication. Materialistic in nature, they regard money as the highest value and do not recognize a homeland. This stratum was termed by Hayk Asatryan as the "nation-betraying shaytan". It is the nationally dead element of Armenians, irreversibly reduced to a mass.

=== Cults in Tseghakronism ===
Tseghakronism recognizes and proclaims the Nation as the supreme sacred entity. An essential component of Tseghakronism is national veneration – the reverence of the nation's qualities, values, and sanctities. There are seven such cults.

- 1. Patriotism

Patriotism is the sacred veneration of the land upon which the Armenian nation naturally arose, where it forged its history and created its culture, where the remains of its sons are laid to rest, and for whose love and freedom its great dead have sacrificed themselves.

- 2. Cult of Blood

In Tseghakronism, the blood of the nation is regarded as sacred, as it determines the nation's spiritual and physical constitution. Tseghakronism preaches reverence for the nation's blood, seeing in its purity the future of the nation.

- 3. Cult of Language

In matters of language, Tseghakronism is uncompromising: it requires Armenians to speak Armenian with one another, emphasizing that the death of a language accelerates the spiritual death of a people. For this reason, it calls for reverence toward the native language, whose purity and meaningful development determine the spiritual future of the nation.

Tseghakronism also stresses the importance of interpreting the conceptual meaning and cultural depth of Armenian words, considering their neglect a shortcoming of Armenian philology.

- 4. Cult of Sacrifice

This is the veneration of the sacred dead of the nation, "who became lion-like in their courage, were deified through their magnificent devotion, and shed their blood to eternalize the existence and honor of our nation".

- 5. Cult of Ancestors

Tseghakronism considers the spiritual rupture between old and new generations a grave wrongdoing, as it breaks the organic link between the nation’s past and future. Nzhdeh writes:

"If the rising generation is cut off from preceding generations, it is essentially severed from the values and sanctities of the nation that existed before it… One who is cut off from the older generation becomes spiritually rootless and directionless. What is essential is spiritual communion between generations, through which they transmit the eternal flame of the nation…"

The flag of the Mamikonians

According to Nzhdeh, spiritual communion means "reliving the lives of past generations through historical memory, linking their fate with ours". Tseghakronism expresses particular reverence for the martial knights of the Mamikonian family. Nzhdeh writes:

"Anyone even somewhat familiar with Armenian history will immediately understand that the Tseghakron movement, as an oath, resembles the oath of the Mamikonian knights. Like the Mamikonians, the Tseghakron professes selfless devotion to the nation and the resolve to bravely accept death for the sake of the homeland."

While honoring the military spirit of the Mamikonians, Nzhdeh also emphasizes the other pole of Armenian identity – the cultural spirit of the Bagratuni dynasty – which he sees as necessarily complementary.

- 6. Cult of Strength

Tseghakronism advocates the worship of strength, asserting that the world yields to the strong – those strong in spirit, intellect, and arm; it is the strong who prevail, not the merely just.

- 7. Cult of Leadership

In Tseghakronism, the true leader of the nation is also an object of reverence – the one whose hand shapes the fate of nations and to whom nations owe their rises and declines. Tseghakronism thus demands that, in obeying the will of the nation, one must also know how to obey its leader, who is the bearer and teacher of national morality.

=== Intra-ethnic morality ===
According to Tseghakronism, the sole guarantee of national unity is adherence to intra-ethnic morality, whereby members of the nation, placing their individual religious and political convictions in a secondary position, are united on the basis of being Armenian. This selfless morality demands from every Armenian who is not indifferent to the future of Armenians the greatest sacrifice – for the sake of the Armenian race and the future of Armenia – namely, the sacrifice of one's "self." Tseghakronism, which upholds the principle of placing the race above all else, instructs the various segments of the Armenian people and individual Armenians to be, first and foremost, Armenian; to remain subordinate and a fighter for the race, regardless of party or religious convictions, social position, or place of residence in the world.

As a supra-party doctrine pursuing political monism, Tseghakronism is irreconcilable with factionalism. Nzhdeh, standing above egocentric party politics, confidently proclaimed: "There are no party martyrs or heroes; there are and will remain only national martyrdom and the heroic national struggle".

== Tseghakronism and religion ==
A vectorized version of the Eagle of Taron

Tseghakronism is not a religion. It is primarily a secular doctrine; "and if it is a religion, then it is the religion of national pride, strength, and courage". Nzhdeh does not call for a return to the ancient Armenian faith, as he understood the naivety and potential dangers of such a step. Nevertheless, he does not conceal his sympathy toward the ancient Armenian religion and the pagan past of the Armenians. He writes:

"In order to define a given nation with approximate accuracy, it must be examined in the mirror of its soul – its religion... In accordance with its intellectual and moral development, a nation imprints in its religion its psychological traits, its perception of the world, its metaphysical essence. The Armenian is existential – this is affirmed by the Armenian pagan religion. The Armenian is existential – this is the source of our great hope and strength."

Nzhdeh speaks admiringly of the "unsurpassed humanity and highly chivalrous spirit of the pre-Christian Armenian." "In Vahagn-Anahit Armenia, I see such traits and virtues that are greatly needed in our era – arrogant, yet spiritually impoverished and ignoble".

Nzhdeh was neither anti-Christian nor a pagan, but neither was he a dogmatic adherent of Christian doctrine. He considered Armenians to be "victims of Christian moral teaching, which continues to exist as a veneer and mask for the souls of the strong". He respected Christ as a heroic figure of an idea, as a man of God, a self-sacrificing and courageous hero, and a sower of eternity. As the founder of Tseghakronism, Nzhdeh wrote:

"Christ loved because he was strong; he loved because he was powerful enough to love and to forgive... He sacrificed because he was a hero of an idea. Only the brave, the courageous – only the hero – can sacrifice."

As well as:

"By abolishing the divide between death and life, the Nazarene denied death and thus became the eternal sower of giants of spirit – saints, martyrs, heroes."

Notable is the Nzhdehian (i.e., Tseghakron) understanding of a Christian: "A Christian is not one who has misunderstood the essence of Christian doctrine, fallen into a web of prejudices, and weakened to the point of perishing, but one in whom there exists at least a spark of Christ – a fragment of the soul of the most powerful man of God".

Tseghakronism subordinates religious affiliation to nationality, adopting the motto "The nation above all". It is not a struggle against Christianity or the Armenian Church, nor does it call for religious conversion; rather, it emphasizes that the ancient gods are witnesses of Armenian origins and embodiments of national qualities. Armenak Barseghyan in his book "The Tseghakron Movement" interprets this approach as follows: "our pagan religion is one of the finest expressions of national aspirations, presenting itself as a concentration of national values".

Tseghakronism seeks to restore a disrupted Armenian national identity. As Mushegh Lalayan writes, it is not a call to fight with the bow and arrow of Hayk, but with the spirit of Hayk. At the same time, it does not advocate abandoning the past or passively awaiting the future. Tseghakronism is a retrospective return to Armenian roots and, inspired by their strength, a confident and resolute orientation toward the future.

=== Vahagn worship ===
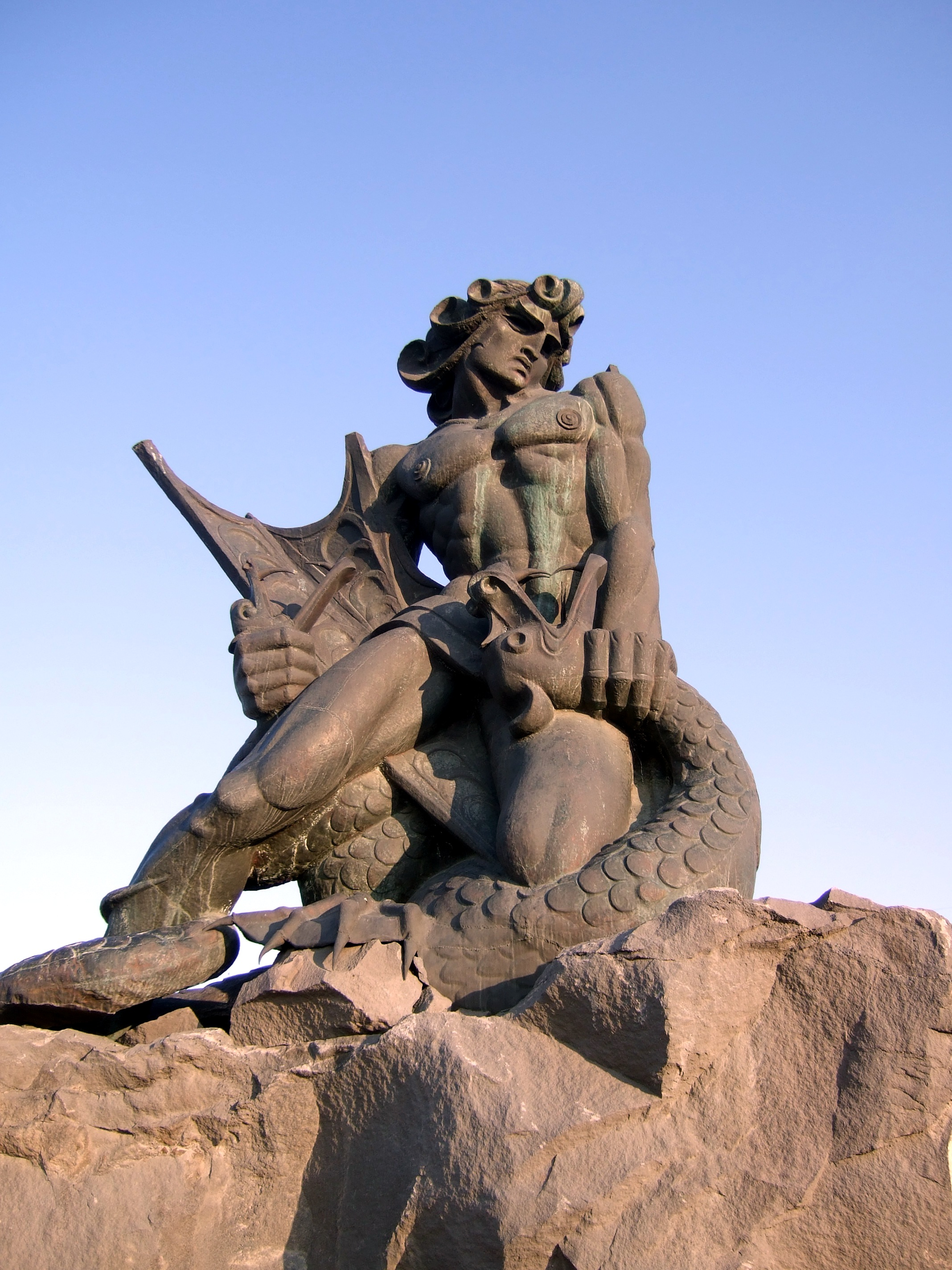
Vahagn the Dragon-Slayer, the supreme deity of war, courage, and victory among the ancient Armenians

Tseghakronism assigns an important role to the veneration of Vahagn, but as a symbol of the bravery of the ancient Armenians rather than as a form of paganism:

"We must now speak with Vahagn – the god of the ancient Aryan Armenians. A new sacred book must be placed in the hands of our people – the gospel of the brave."

"In the collective soul of the Armenian people, the veneration of our ancient and powerful god must arise with commanding force. Temples shall be built for Vahagn... everywhere Armenians live – in every soul, for courage has always been the eternal duty of those nations that do not wish to perish. ‘Become brave, make others brave’ – this shall be our slogan of the day. Vahagn as God, the worship of courage as the new religion, the Armenian as brave – if we do not wish one day to yield our place under the sun to those stronger than us."

Nevertheless, Tseghakronism does not oppose Vahagn and Christ, nor the Armenian and the Christian, but rather sees them as fundamentally compatible: "from the beginning, Armenians and their Christianity have been fused into a single nature." At the same time:

"It is an unforgivable mistake to explain Armenian devotion to Christianity through religious fervor. Fanaticism is alien to the Armenian spirit... The dominant consciousness among Armenians has long been national... Armenians nationalized Christianity very early. Armenian identity is the true religion of the Armenian."

=== Attitude toward the Armenian Church ===
Tseghakronism is not opposed to the Armenian Apostolic Church; on the contrary, it considers itself an inseparable part of it. However, according to Nzhdeh, the Church "has misunderstood the essence of Christian love and, as a result, has for centuries contributed to the unparalleled tragedy of our people." Tseghakronism calls for the nationalization of the Armenian Church, a reevaluation of its ideological foundations, and, above all, a reconsideration of "its mistaken understanding of Christian love." As Nzhdeh writes:

"Our Church has erred – gravely erred – by preaching the morality of the weak and destitute. Henceforth it must speak of a brave people capable of love and sacrifice, if it wishes Christianity to endure in Asia Minor and Armenia. A strong and courageous people, capable of disregarding death for the sake of its own existence. Thus will not only Armenians survive, but also the Armenian Church. Self-defense of the Armenian people – this shall be the new creed of the Armenian Church."

== Tseghakronism and the Armenian Question ==
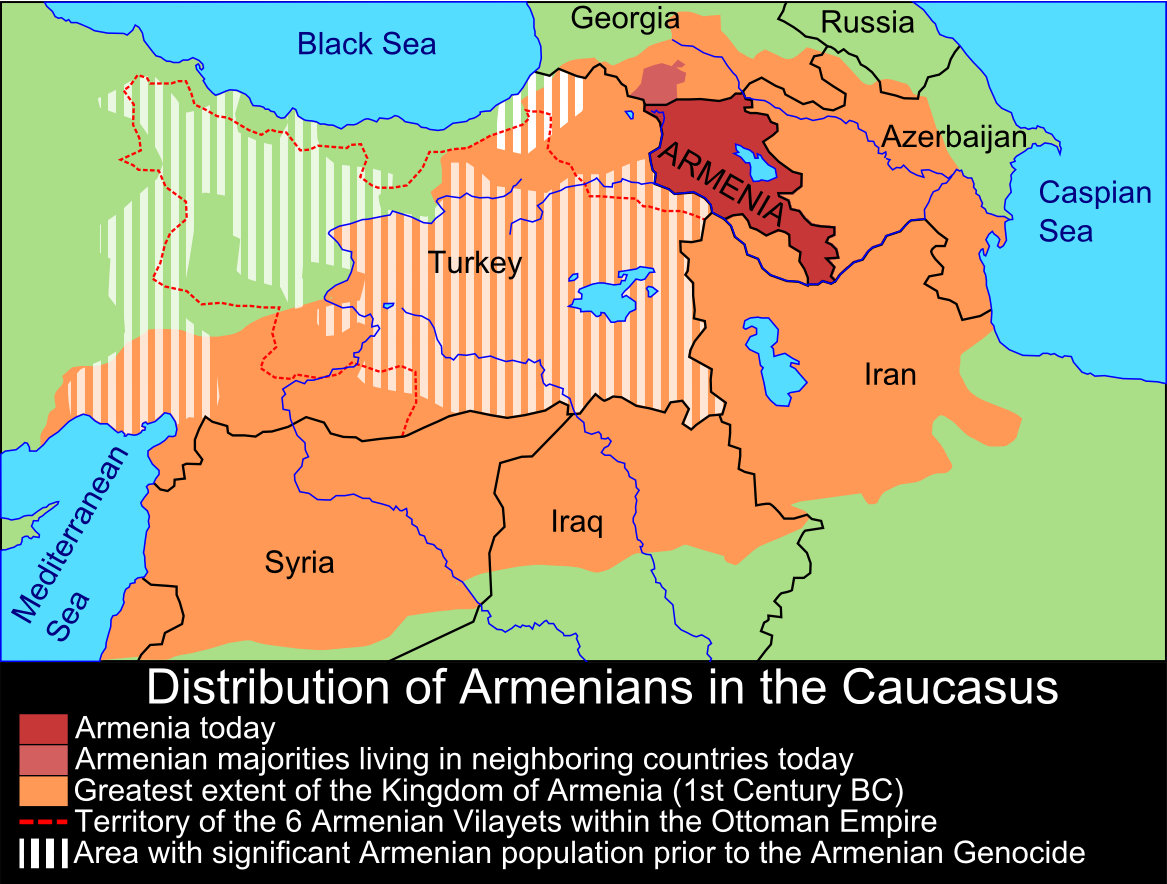
Distribution of Armenians in their homeland, the Armenian Highlands

The title page of the first Program-Statute of the Tseghakron Oaths was adorned with the slogan "Lausanne? – No, never!". For the Tseghakrons, the Armenian Question did not end with the pro-Turkish Treaty of Lausanne, and they continued to regard themselves as claimants against Turkey. Convinced that the reconquest of Armenian lands was possible only through their own blood, and that only the courage and patriotism of the Armenian soldier could establish durable and just borders for Armenia, Garegin Nzhdeh wrote:

"The native land of one people cannot become the permanent homeland of another... By the force of the enduring law of justice, seized territories sooner or later pass into the hands of their historical owners – provided that, in the latter, time has not weakened love, longing, and devotion toward the homeland."

Tseghakronism was thus understood as a will to reclaim the homeland – a sacred pledge of return to the land for Armenians in exile, whether wealthy or laborers. It was also framed as a duty of retribution, a call not to forgive the Turks and, accordingly, as a forge of avengers, where "for every Armenian victim, two new avengers would arise". Tseghakronism called for uncompromising vengeance against the Turks and a harsh judgment upon that blood-guilty people, who were responsible for the destruction of half of the Armenian population. This enmity was presented not merely as historical, but as biological in nature.

== Tseghakronism and foreign ideologies ==
=== Fascism and Nazism ===
Tseghakronism is often, either naively or deliberately, characterized as an imported form of fascism or Nazism.

When, in 1933 at the ARF General Assembly, Garegin Nzhdeh was asked whether his teachings were fascism or Nazism, he replied:

"What I preach is neither of those doctrines; I wish to bring to light our historical ancient heroism and the layers of Armenian culture that have remained buried under dust."

As Nzhdeh writes, fascism is the Italian expression of nationalism, while Nazism is the German one. During Nzhdeh's oath-bound marches, when participants wore black robes ("patanakrats" expeditions) and received lessons in ethnic empowerment and pride, Benito Mussolini had only just begun his movement of the Blackshirts.

"The idea of Tseghakronism is distinctly Armenian. This movement is shaped by the essence of our own nation. There was not yet any talk of fascism or Hitlerism when, in 1919, the idea of Tseghakronism had already mobilized our Davitbekian Oaths in the region of Syunik."

The difference between Tseghakronism and Nazism lies in the fact that the latter proclaims the Aryan race as the only culture-creating race, considering all other nations as subordinate types. Tseghakronism is free from doctrines of chosen-ness or exclusivity. Nazism, under the necessity of so-called "living space," promotes expansionism that, unnaturally, extends beyond national borders. Tseghakronism sets as its goal the reclamation of our true homeland – the Armenian Highland. Nazism regards Jews as an enemy of humanity and a destructive type of culture, and anti-Jewish sentiment occupies a central place in its ideology. Such views are entirely absent in Tseghakronism. It declares the Turks as enemies of the nation, since they, through the destruction of part of the Armenian population, have taken control of much of Armenia.

=== Zionism ===
Hovhannes Hovhannisyan argues that the "racial conception and inspiration of Tseghakronism came primarily from the Jewish people". According to Mushegh Lalayan, who disagrees with this view, "although Nzhdeh spoke respectfully of Zionism (as well as other homeland-oriented nationalist movements), it is unequivocally asserted that his source of inspiration was the Armenian race itself, with its tragedy and heroism," citing the following statement by Nzhdeh as evidence:

"The Tseghakron movement has nothing in common with foreign doctrines, nor could it, since it is above all a reformist movement – a rebirth – which is possible only through one’s own, not borrowed, values."

=== Philosophy of Friedrich Nietzsche ===
It is often claimed that Tseghakronism was formed under the influence of Friedrich Nietzsche. Indeed, the power-centered rhetoric and resolute style of Tseghakronism bear certain similarities to Nietzsche's philosophy; however, there are fundamental differences in worldview and moral doctrine. For example, the core of Nietzsche's philosophy is the individual – Übermensch – who appears as an end, whereas the foundation of Tseghakronism is the tsegh, and the tseghamard is a means for the nation. Nietzsche is anti-Christian, rejects any compromise with Christianity, and does not accept any reform within it, whereas Tseghakronism is not anti-Christian and sets the goal only of nationalizing the Armenian Church. Nietzsche is also an atheist, whereas Tseghakronism accepts the existence of God.

== See also ==
- United Armenia
- Garegin Nzhdeh
