= Garegin Nzhdeh =

Armenian revolutionary (1886–1955)

Garegin Ter-Harutyunyan
- Գարեգին Առաքել Եղիշեի Տեր-Հարությունյան
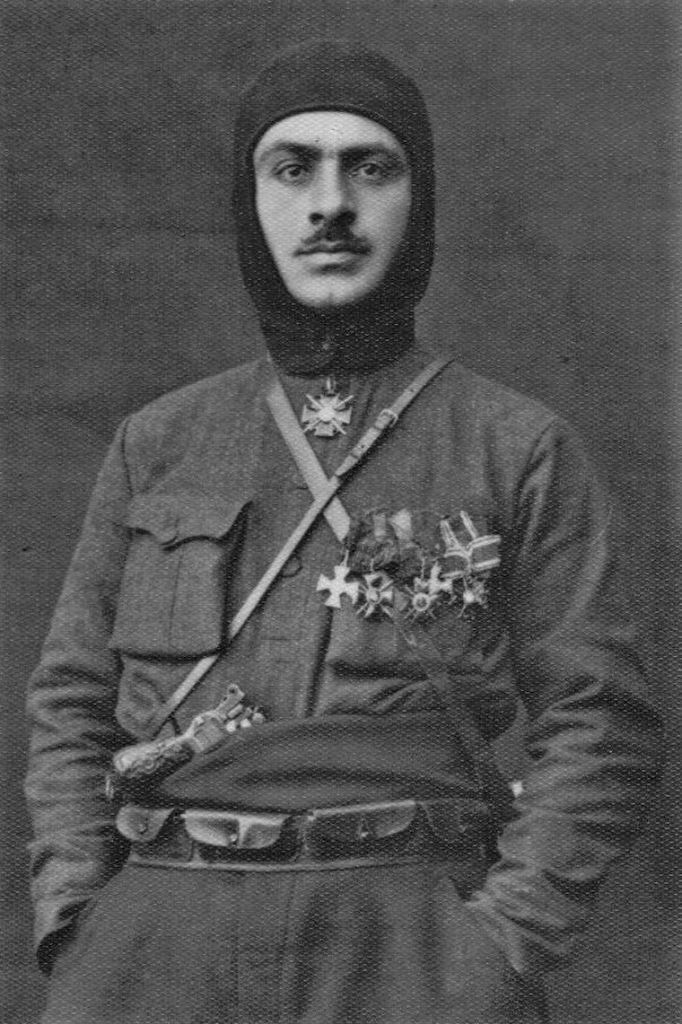
- Born: Garegin Ter-Harutyunyan; 1 January 1886; Kznut, Erivan Governorate, Russian Empire
- Died: 21 December 1955 (aged 69); Vladimir Central Prison, Vladimir, Soviet Union
- Burial place: Spitakavor Monastery
- Other name: Garegin Nzhdeh
- Spouse(s): Epimé Sukiassian (m. ?–1955); Gohar Dadayan
- Children: Vrezh; Lilia Dadayan
- Military career
- Allegiance: ARF Party (1907–1937); Kingdom of Bulgaria (1912–1913); Russian Empire (1914–1917); Republic of Armenia (1918–1920); Mountainous Armenia (1921)
- Rank: Sparapet
- Conflicts: First Balkan War; Bulgarian front; Battle of Kardzhali; Second Balkan War; First World War; Caucasus campaign; Armenian-Azerbaijani War; Turkish War of Independence; Turkish-Armenian War; Battle for Zangezur
- Awards: Order of Courage of the Kingdom of Bulgaria; Order of Saint Vladimir 3rd class of the Russian Empire; Order of Saint Anna 4th class of the Russian Empire; Order of Saint George 3rd class of the Russian Empire; Order of Saint George 2nd class of the Russian Empire

Signature
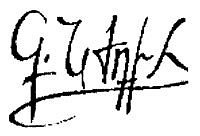

Garegin Ter-Harutyunyan, (Note: Armenian: Գարեգին Տէր Յարութիւնեան; Reformed orthography: Գարեգին Տեր-Հարությունյան) better known by his nom de guerre Garegin Nzhdeh (Note: Nzhdeh in Armenian means "exile" or "wanderer". Also transliterated as Karekin Njdeh or Nejdeh.) (Armenian: Գարեգին Նժդեհ, IPA: [ɡɑɾɛˈɡin nəʒˈdɛh]; 1 January 1886 – 21 December 1955), was an Armenian statesman, military commander and nationalist revolutionary. As a member of the Armenian Revolutionary Federation, he was involved in the national liberation struggle and revolutionary activities during the First Balkan War and World War I and became one of the key political and military leaders of the First Republic of Armenia (1918–1921). He is widely admired as a charismatic national hero by Armenians.

In 1921, he was a key figure in the establishment of the Republic of Mountainous Armenia, an anti-Bolshevik state that became a key factor that led to the inclusion of the province of Syunik into Soviet Armenia. During World War II, he cooperated with Nazi Germany, hoping to secure Soviet Armenia's existence in case of Germany's victory over the USSR and a potential Turkish invasion of the Caucasus. Following an abortive attempt to cooperate with the Soviet Union against Turkey, Nzhdeh was arrested in Bulgaria in 1944 and sentenced to 25 years of imprisonment in the Soviet Union. He died in Vladimir Central Prison in 1955.

== Early years and education ==
Garegin Ter-Harutyunyan was born on 1 January 1886 in the village of Kznut (modern-day Güznüt, Azerbaijan) in the region of Nakhichevan. He was the youngest of four children born to a local village priest. He lost his father, Ter Yeghishe, early in his childhood. Nzhdeh attended a Russian school in the city of Nakhichevan and continued his education at a gymnasium in Tiflis (Tbilisi).

Shortly after, he moved to Saint Petersburg to continue his education at Saint Petersburg Imperial University. After two years of studying at the university's faculty of law, he left Saint Petersburg and returned to the Caucasus in order to participate in the Armenian national movement against the Ottoman Empire. In 1906, Nzhdeh moved to Bulgaria, where he completed his education at the Dmitry Nikolov Military College of Sofia and in 1907 received a commission in the Bulgarian army with the rank of lieutenant.

== Balkan wars ==
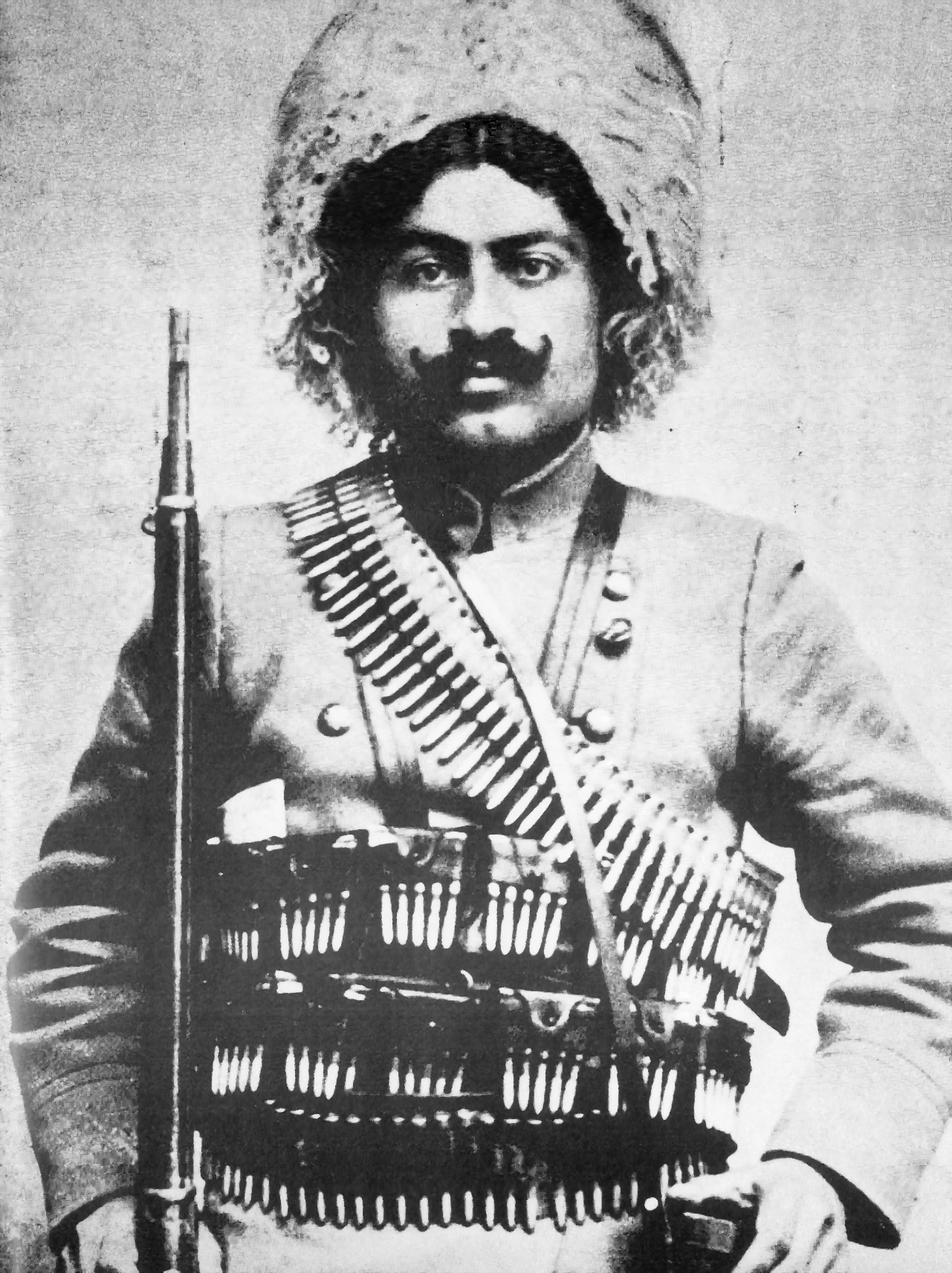
Garegin Nzhdeh during the Balkan Wars, 1912–1913

In 1907 Nzhdeh returned to the South Caucasus. In 1908 he joined the Armenian Revolutionary Federation and participated in the Iranian Constitutional Revolution along with Yeprem Khan and Murad of Sebastia.

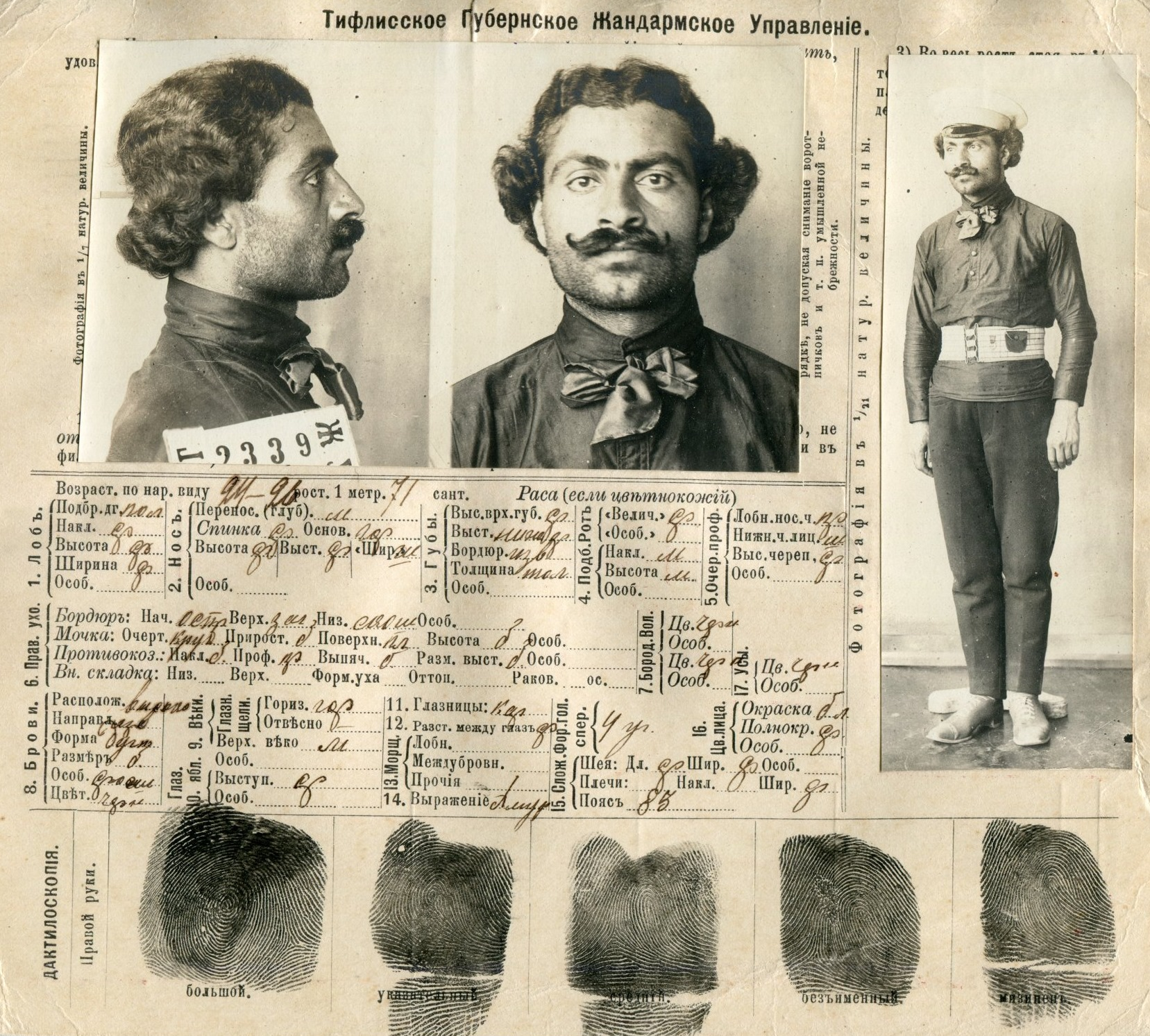
Nzhdeh mugshot, 1911

In 1909, upon his return to the Caucasus, Nzhdeh was arrested by the Russian authorities and spent three years in prison. In 1912, together with General Andranik Ozanian, he joined a battalion of ethnic Armenians within the Macedonian-Adrianopolitan Volunteer Corps of the Bulgarian army to fight against the Ottoman Empire in the Balkan wars, partaking in the campaigns to seize Thrace and Macedonia. Bulgarian military authorities awarded Nzhdeh with the Cross of Bravery for the bravery and extraordinary performance of the Armenian fighters.

Bulgarian sources and documents also claim that Nzhdeh took part on the Second Balkan War on the front against Serbia, being wounded in its very beginning, on 18 June 1913. Nzhdeh himself wrote that, during that war, he and the Armenian Company had "refused to participate in the internal fighting of the Balkan peoples" and had disbanded the company.

== World War I ==
Prior to World War I, after an amnesty granted by the Russian authorities in 1914, Nzhdeh returned to the Caucasus to participate in the formation of Armenian volunteer units within the Russian army to fight against the Ottoman Empire. In the early stages of the war, in 1915, he was appointed a deputy commander to Drastamat Kanayan (Dro), who led the 2nd Volunteer Battalion. Later on, in 1916, he commanded a special Armenian-Yezidi military unit. After the Russian Revolution and the withdrawal of the Russian army, Nzhdeh's unit fought in the skirmishes at Alaja (near Ani, spring 1918), allowing secure passage for retreating Armenian forces into Alexandropol (modern-day Gyumri).

== Battle of Karakilisa and the First Republic of Armenia ==
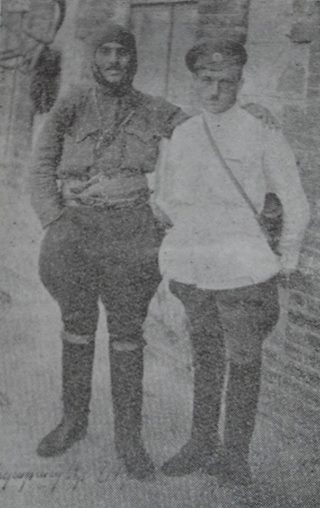
General Garegin Nzhdeh and Colonel Ruben Narinian in autumn 1920

After clashing with Ottoman forces in Alexandropol, the Armenian fighters led by Nzhdeh dug in and built fortifications in Karakilisa (modern-day Vanadzor). Nzhdeh played a key role in organizing the troops for the defense of Karakilisa in May 1918. He managed to mobilize a population of demoralized locals and refugees for the coming fight through his inspiring speech in the Dilijan church courtyard, where he called on the Armenians to wage a sacred battle: "Straight to the frontline, our salvation is there". Nzhdeh was wounded in the ensuing clash and, after a violent battle of four days, both sides had serious casualties. The Armenians ran out of ammunition and had to withdraw. Although the Ottoman army managed to invade Karakilisa itself, they had no more resources to continue deeper into Armenian territory.

In April 1920, Nzhdeh led his troops from Kapan to Mountainous Karabakh's southern district of Dizak, soon after the massacre of the Armenian population of Shushi. Dro's forces also marched to Karabakh from Yerevan. Their intervention, along with pressure on the Azerbaijani authorities from the Entente powers, brought an end to the massacres of the Armenian population of Mountainous Karabakh. However, following the Soviet takeover of Azerbaijan and the arrival of the Red Army, the Armenian forces were severely outnumbered. On 24 May 1920, Dro, Nzhdeh, Colonel Dmitri Mirimanyan and ARF representative Arsen Mikayelyan agreed to withdraw from Karabakh and hand over power in the region to local Armenian Bolsheviks led by Sargis Hambardzumyan.

While stationed in southern Armenia, Nzhdeh expelled the Turkic-speaking inhabitants of several settlements. He was again wounded in fighting near Goris. In August 1920, Nzhdeh refused orders from Minister of Defense Ruben Ter Minasian to leave Kapan and come to Yerevan in accordance with an agreement reached with Soviet Russia to allow the Red Army to enter Zangezur (Syunik), Karabakh and Nakhichevan. In January 1920, Nzhdeh's partisans, aggravated by the massacre of Armenians at Akulis, "wiped out" 9 villages and 40 hamlets southeast of Goris – the continued attacks on Azerbaijani Muslim settlements led Azerbaijan to reposition its forces towards Zangezur again after their unsuccessful campaign in November 1919.

== Republic of Mountainous Armenia ==
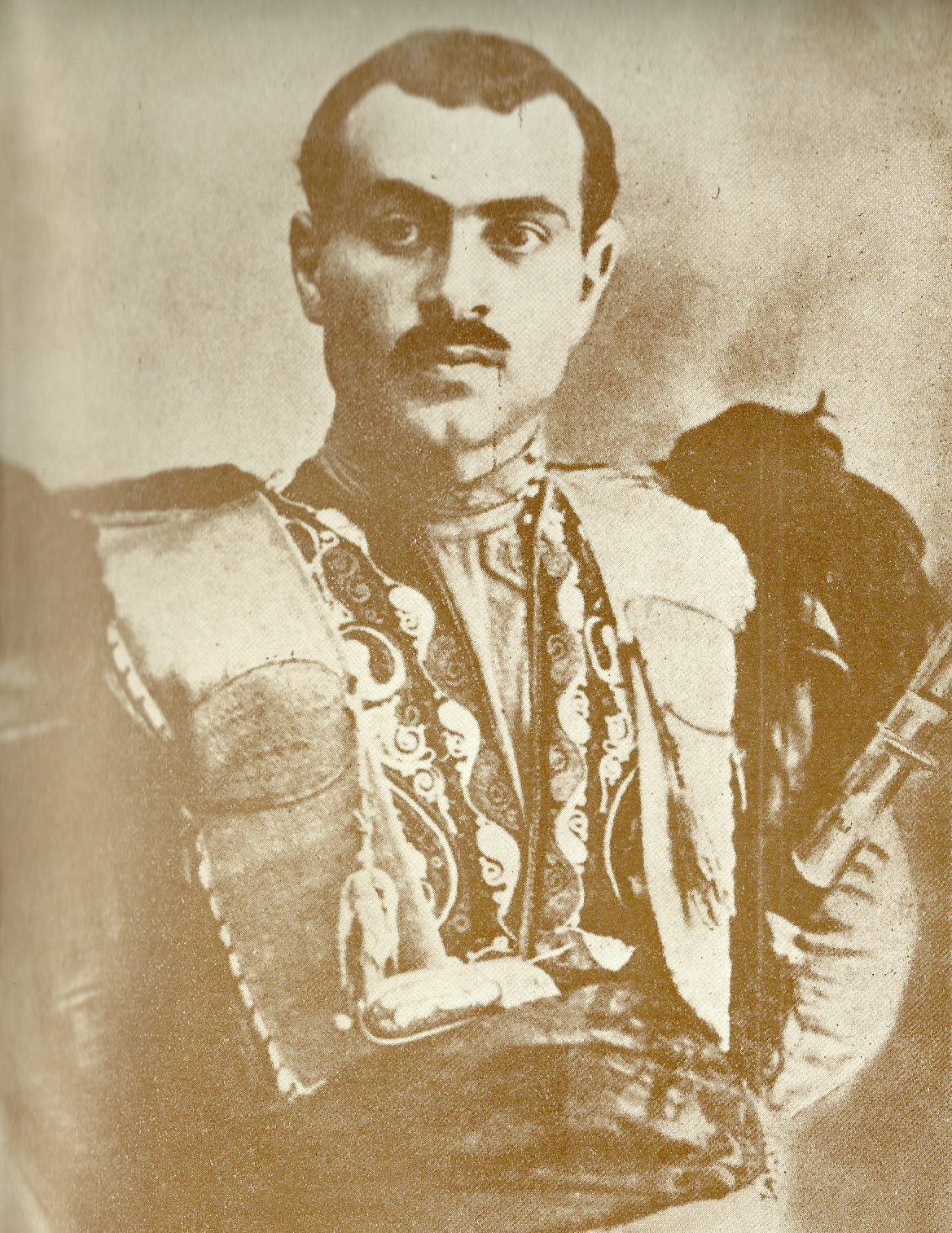
Nzhdeh in Goris, Republic of Mountainous Armenia (1921)

The Soviet Eleventh Army's invasion of the First Republic of Armenia started on 29 November 1920. Following the Sovietization of Armenia on 2 December 1920, the Soviets pledged to take steps to rebuild the army, to protect the Armenians and not to persecute non-communists, although the final condition of this pledge was reneged when the Dashnaks were forced out of the country.

The Soviet government proposed that the regions of Mountainous Karabakh and Zangezur should be included in the newly established Soviet Azerbaijan. This step was strongly rejected by Nzhdeh. A convinced anti-Bolshevik, he consolidated his forces in Syunik and led a movement against the Bolsheviks, declaring Syunik a self-governing region in December 1920. In January 1921 Drastamat Kanayan sent a telegram to Nzhdeh, advising that Nzhdeh allow for the sovietization of Syunik, through which they could gain the support of the Bolshevik government in solving the problems of Armenian-populated lands. Nzhdeh did not depart from Syunik and continued his struggle against the Red Army and Soviet Azerbaijan, struggling to maintain the independence of the region.

On 18 February 1921, the Dashnaks led an anti-Soviet rebellion in Yerevan and seized power. The ARF controlled Yerevan and the surrounding regions for almost 42 days before being defeated by the numerically superior Red Army troops later in April 1921. The leaders of the rebellion—as well as 8,000 refugees and 4,000 soldiers— then retreated to Syunik.

Emblem of the Republic of Mountainous Armenia

The 2nd All-Zangezur Congress, held in Tatev on 26 April 1921, declared the independence of the self-governing regions of Daralagiaz (Vayots Dzor), Zangezur, and Mountainous Karabakh under the name of the Republic of Mountainous Armenia (Lernahayastani Hanrapetutyun), with Nzhdeh (bearing the title of sparapet, meaning "supreme commander") as its prime minister and minister of defense. On June 1, the Republic of Mountainous Armenia was renamed the Republic of Armenia, and Simon Vratsian took the office of prime minister, while Nzhdeh remained as sparapet.

Between April and July 1921, the Red Army conducted massive military operations in the region, attacking Syunik from north and the east. After months of fierce battles with the Red Army, the Republic of Mountainous Armenia capitulated in July 1921 following Soviet Russia's promises to keep the mountainous region as a part of Soviet Armenia. After the conflict, Nzhdeh, his soldiers, and many prominent Armenian intellectuals, including leaders of the first independent Republic of Armenia, crossed the border into the neighboring Iranian city of Tabriz.

== Organizational activities ==
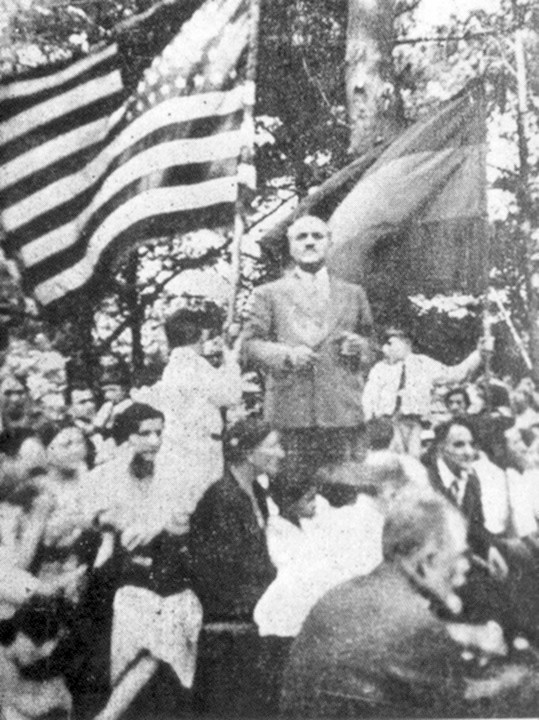
Nzhdeh at the founding of the Armenian Youth Federation in Boston in 1933

After leaving Syunik, Nzhdeh spent four months in the city of Tabriz. There his relations with the ARF leadership worsened, and he was expelled from the party in September 1921 at the suggestion of Simon Vratsian. Soon after, he moved to Sofia, Bulgaria, where he settled and married Epimé, a local Armenian woman. They had one son together, named Vrezh. At the 10th ARF World Congress, Nzhdeh's case was reviewed and he was restored to the party.

Nzhdeh was involved in organizational activities in Bulgaria, Romania and the United States through his frequent visits to Plovdiv, Bucharest and Boston. In 1926, Nzhdeh again came into dispute with the ARF leadership over the issue of relations with Turkey, with the party organization in Bulgaria being divided between supporters of Nzhdeh and supporters of the ARF Bureau (the party's top executive body). The ARF Bureau, in particular leading members Ruben Ter Minasian and Simon Vratsian, expressed its desire to establish relations with Turkey, while Nzhdeh and others such as Shahan Natalie believed that the party should maintain a strictly anti-Turkish orientation.

In 1933, by the decision of ARF, Nzhdeh moved to the United States along with his comrade, Kopernik Tanterjian. He visited several states and provinces in United States and Canada, inspiring the Armenian communities that had established themselves there, and founding an Armenian youth movement called Tseghakron (Armenian: Ցեղակրոն) (see Tseghakronism) in Boston, Massachusetts, which later renamed itself the Armenian Youth Federation, and functions to this day as the youth wing of the ARF.

In the autumn of 1934, Nzhdeh returned to Sofia. He was summoned by the party to Cairo in 1937, where the ARF Bureau unsuccessfully attempted to resolve its differences with Nzhdeh and reconcile him with Ruben Ter Minasian. After returning to Sofia, Nzhdeh declared his resignation from the ARF; the Bureau likewise declared his expulsion from the party for his "schismatic activities" and confirmed this decision at the 13th ARF World Congress (1938). In 1937, Nzhdeh went to Plovdiv, Bulgaria, where he began to publish the Armenian-language newspaper, Razmik, together with fellow former ARF member Hayk Asatryan. At the end of the 1930s, along with a group of Armenian intellectuals in Sofia, he founded the Taron Nationalist Movement and published its organ Taroni Artsiv ("Eagle of Taron") newspaper. Despite his falling out with the ARF, which some scholars attribute to Nzhdeh's "extreme" or "racist views", ARF newspapers would continue to publish his articles. In 1938, the ARF offered to restore Nzhdeh to the party and accommodate his political demands to prevent him from forming a separate organization, which Nzhdeh rejected.

During his time in Bulgaria, Nzhdeh maintained close contacts with revolutionary organizations of Macedonian Bulgarians and Bulgarian Symbolist poet Theodore Trayanov.

== World War II, arrest and trial ==
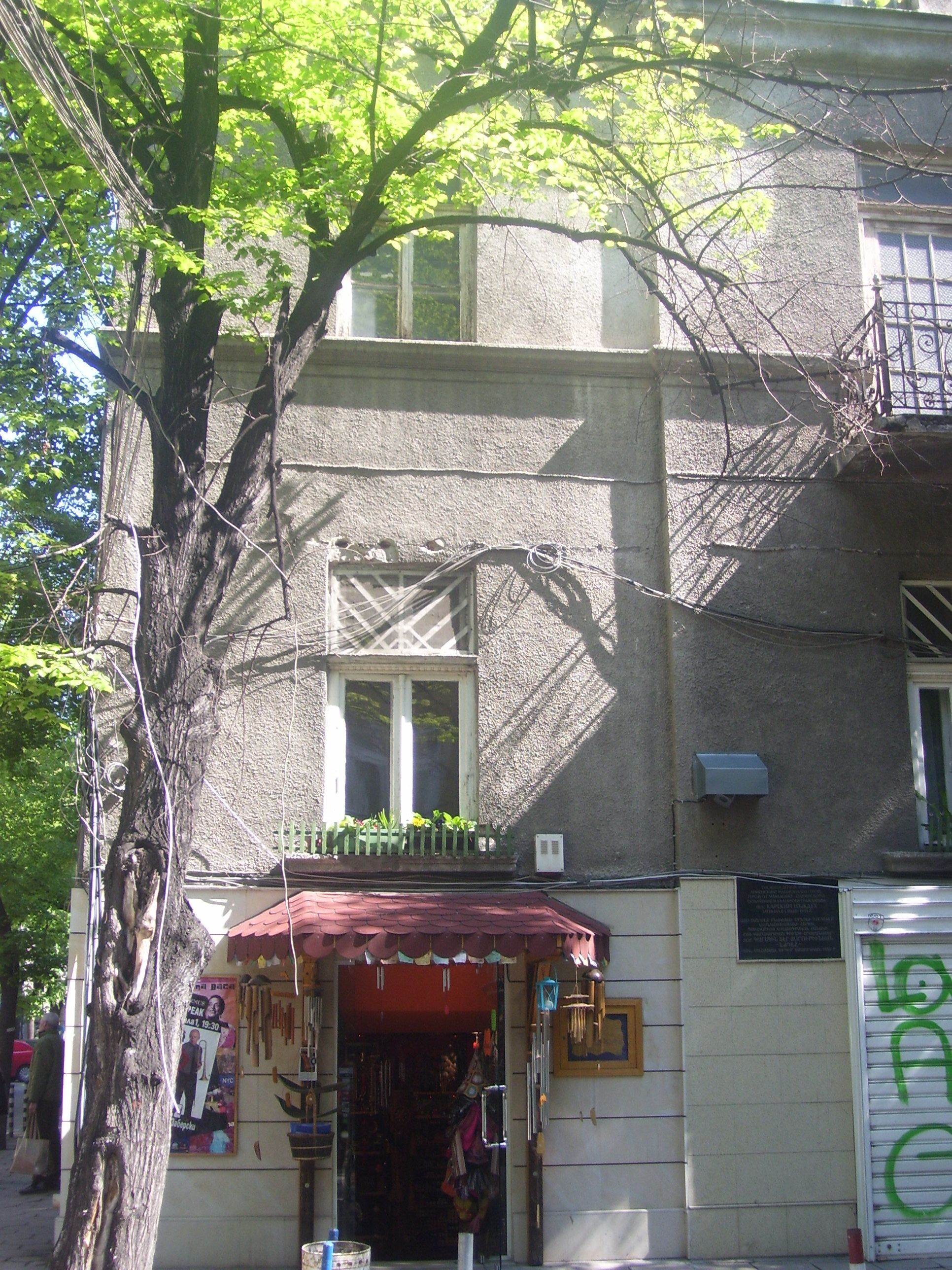
House of Nzhdeh in Sofia

During World War II, Nzhdeh suggested supporting the Axis powers if the latter would make a decision to attack Turkey. Operation Gertrud, a joint German-Bulgarian project about attacking Turkey in the event that Ankara joined the allies, was discussed in Berlin. In 1942, Nzhdeh was invited by Artashes Abeghyan to serve on the Armenian National Council (Armenischen Nationalen Gremiums) in Berlin, a collaborationist body created by Nazi Germany to coerce Armenian POWs into joining to avoid imprisonment in concentration camps. That year the Nazis created the Armenische Legion, composed mostly of captured Soviet Armenian prisoners of war, and placed it under the command of veteran ARF leader Drastamat Kanayan. Together with Artashes Abeghyan and Abraham Gyulkhandanyan, Nzhdeh co-edited and wrote for Azat Hayastan ("Free Armenia"), the pro-German and anti-Soviet organ of the Armenian National Council, which published only two issues in 1943.

The Armenian battalions were sent to the Crimean peninsula on the Eastern Front in 1943. During the war, Nzhdeh went with Dro to Nazi-occupied Crimea and then to the North Caucasus, but returned to Bulgaria in 1944. On 9 September 1944 Nzhdeh wrote a letter to Stalin offering his support were the Soviet leadership to attack Turkey. A Soviet plan to invade Turkey in order to punish Ankara for alleged collaboration with the Nazis and also for seizing several eastern provinces was intensely discussed by the Soviet leadership in 1945–1947. The Soviet military commanders told Nzhdeh that the idea of collaboration was interesting but in order to be able to discuss it in more details, Nzhdeh would have needed to travel to Moscow. He was transferred to Bucharest and later to Moscow, where he was arrested and held in the Lubyanka prison. According to another account, Nzhdeh went into hiding after the Communist takeover in Bulgaria in 1944, before turning himself in to the authorities some months later, after which he was transferred to Moscow.

After his arrest, Nzhdeh's wife and son were sent to exile from Sofia to Pavlikeni.

In November 1946, Nzhdeh was sent to Yerevan, Armenia, awaiting trial. At the end of his trial, on 24 April 1948, Nzhdeh was charged with "counterrevolutionary" activities from the 1920–1921 period and sentenced to 25 years of imprisonment (to begin in 1944).

== Life in prison and death ==
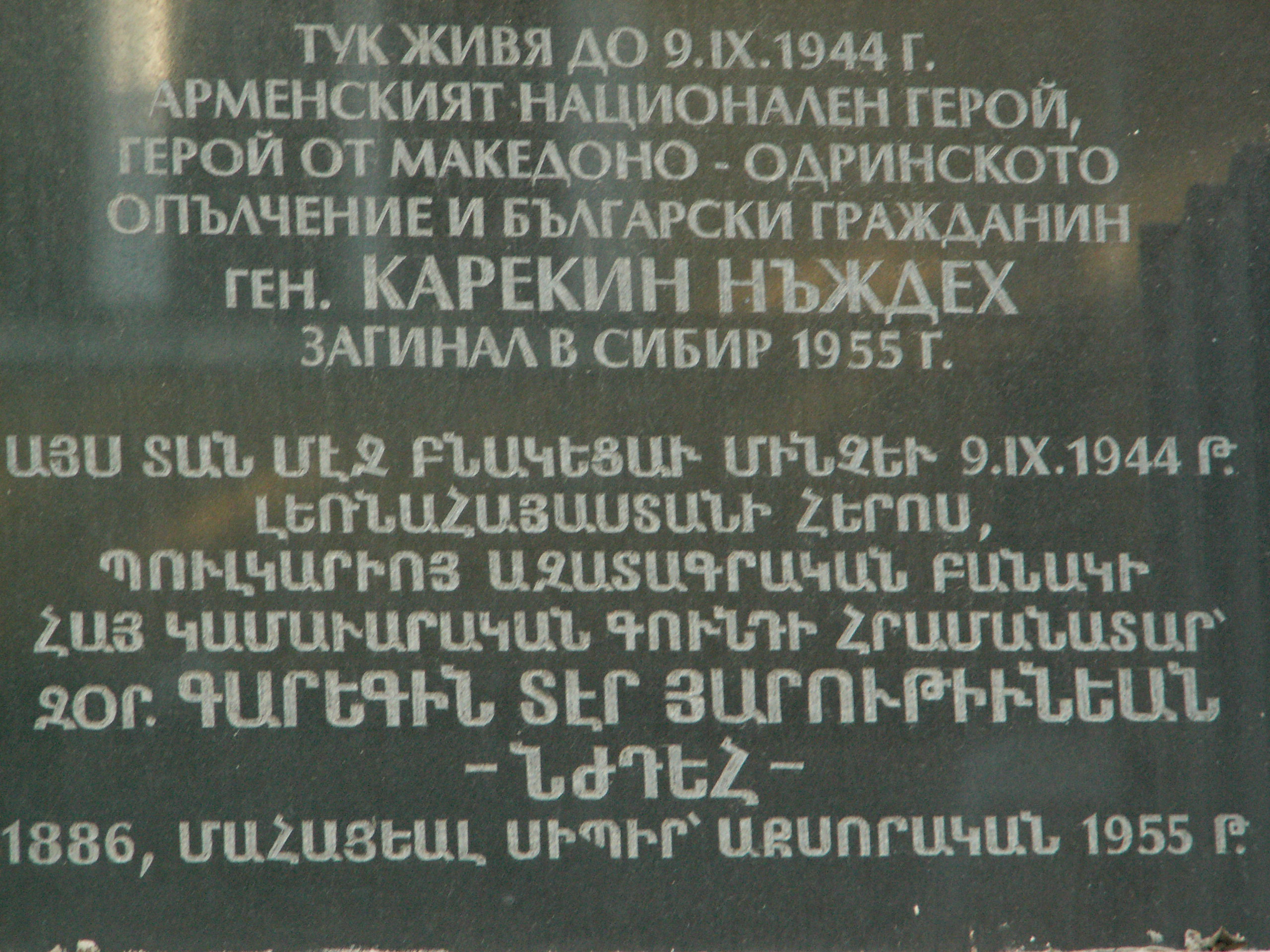
Commemorative plaque on the house of Nzhdeh in Sofia, where he was arrested in 1944

I spit on your execution. You must understand who you are dealing with. I'm Garegin Nzhdeh, a staunch enemy of the Bolshevism. I dedicated my own life to the struggle for freedom and independence of my people. I defended Zangezur from the Turks and the Turkish Bolsheviks. Is it possible that I will be afraid of your execution? Many have tried to threaten me, but they could not do anything.

— Garegin Nzhdeh to KGB Colonel Martiros Aghekian

In 1947 Nzhdeh proposed an initiative to the Soviet government that would call for the foundation of a pan-Armenian military and political organization in the Armenian diaspora for the seizure of once-Armenian populated provinces of the former Ottoman Empire from Turkish control and its unification with Soviet Armenia. Despite the reputed interest of the Communist leadership to this initiative, the proposal was eventually refused.

Between 1948 and 1952 Nzhdeh was kept in Vladimir Prison, then until the summer of 1953 in a secret prison in Yerevan. According to his prison fellow Hovhannes Devedjian, Nzhdeh's transfer to Yerevan prison was related to an attempt to mediate between the Dashnaks and the Soviet leaders to create a collaborative atmosphere between the two sides. After long negotiations with the state security service of Soviet Armenia, Nzhdeh and Devedjian prepared a letter in Yerevan prison (1953) addressed to the ARF leader Simon Vratsian, calling on him to cooperate with the Soviets regarding the issue of the Armenian struggle against Turkey. However, the communist leaders in Moscow refused to send the letter.

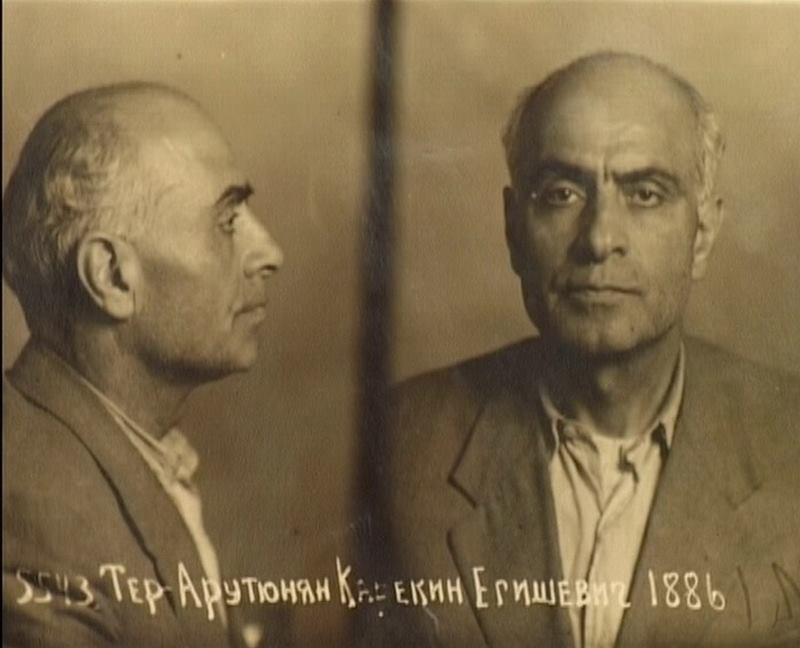
Nzhdeh in Vladimir Prison

While he was in prison, Nzhdeh was taken several times from Vladimir to Armenia, where, accompanied by a guard of honor, they conducted tours of Soviet Armenia, showing him that Soviet power brought benefits to Armenia.

After receiving a telegram from the Soviet authorities announcing his death, Nzhdeh's brother Levon left Yerevan for Vladimir to take care of his burial service. He received Nzhdeh's watch and clothing but was not allowed to take his personal writings, which would only be published in Yerevan several years later. The authorities also did not allow the transfer of his body to Armenia. Levon Ter-Harutyunyan conducted Nzhdeh's burial in Vladimir and wrote on his tombstone, in Russian, "Ter-Harutyunyan Garegin Eghishevich (1886–1955)".

=== Funerals and memorials ===
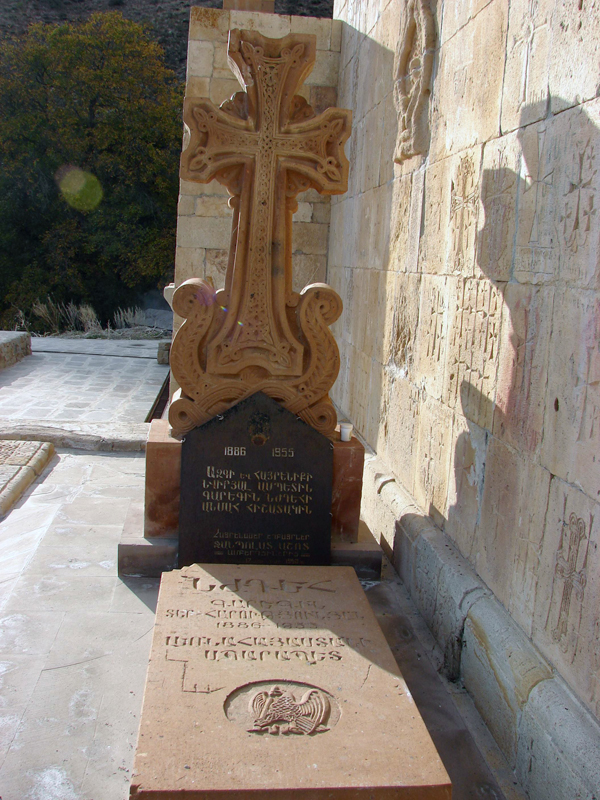
Nzhdeh's tombstone at the Spitakavor Monastery

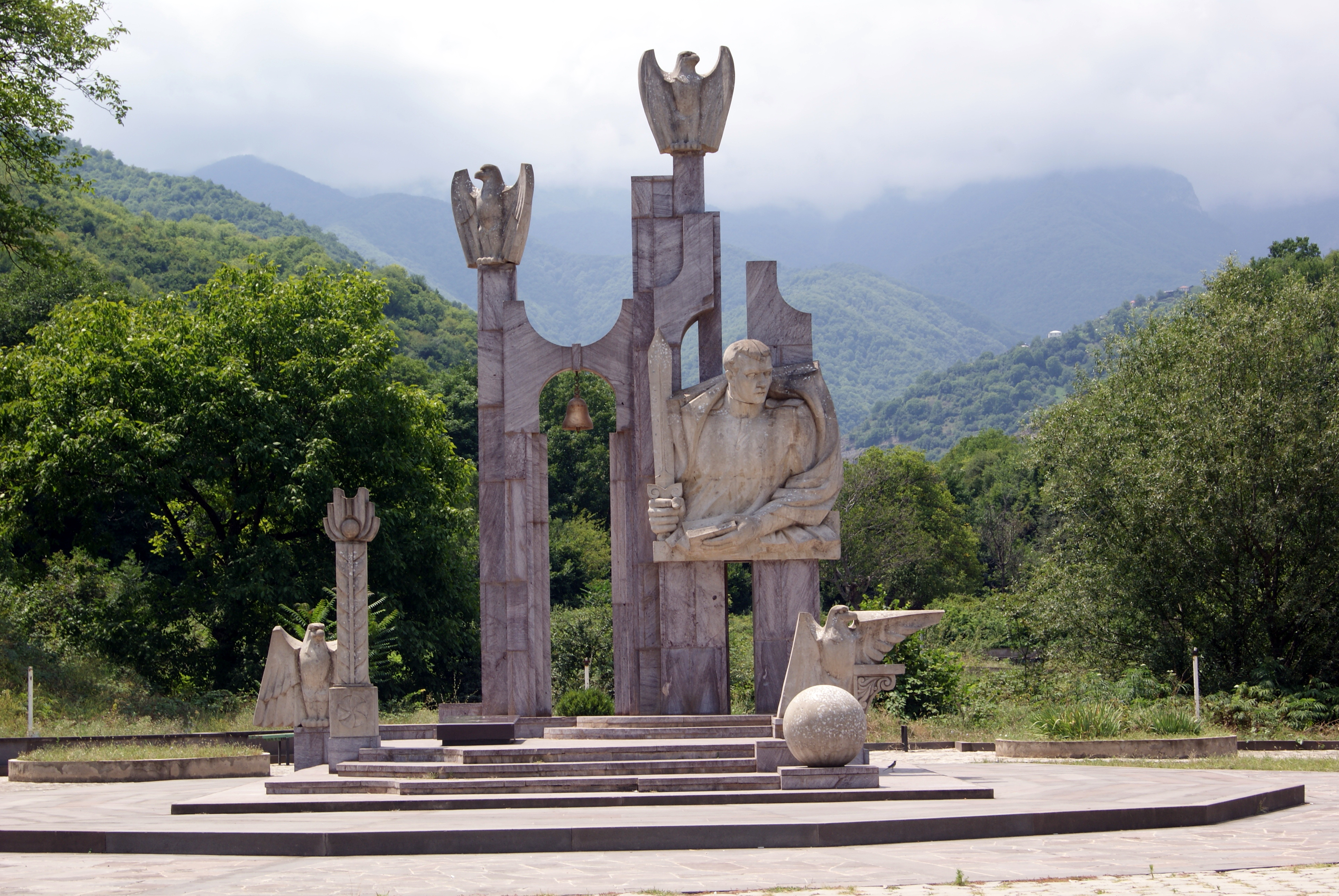
Garegin Nzhdeh's memorial in Kapan, opened in 2003

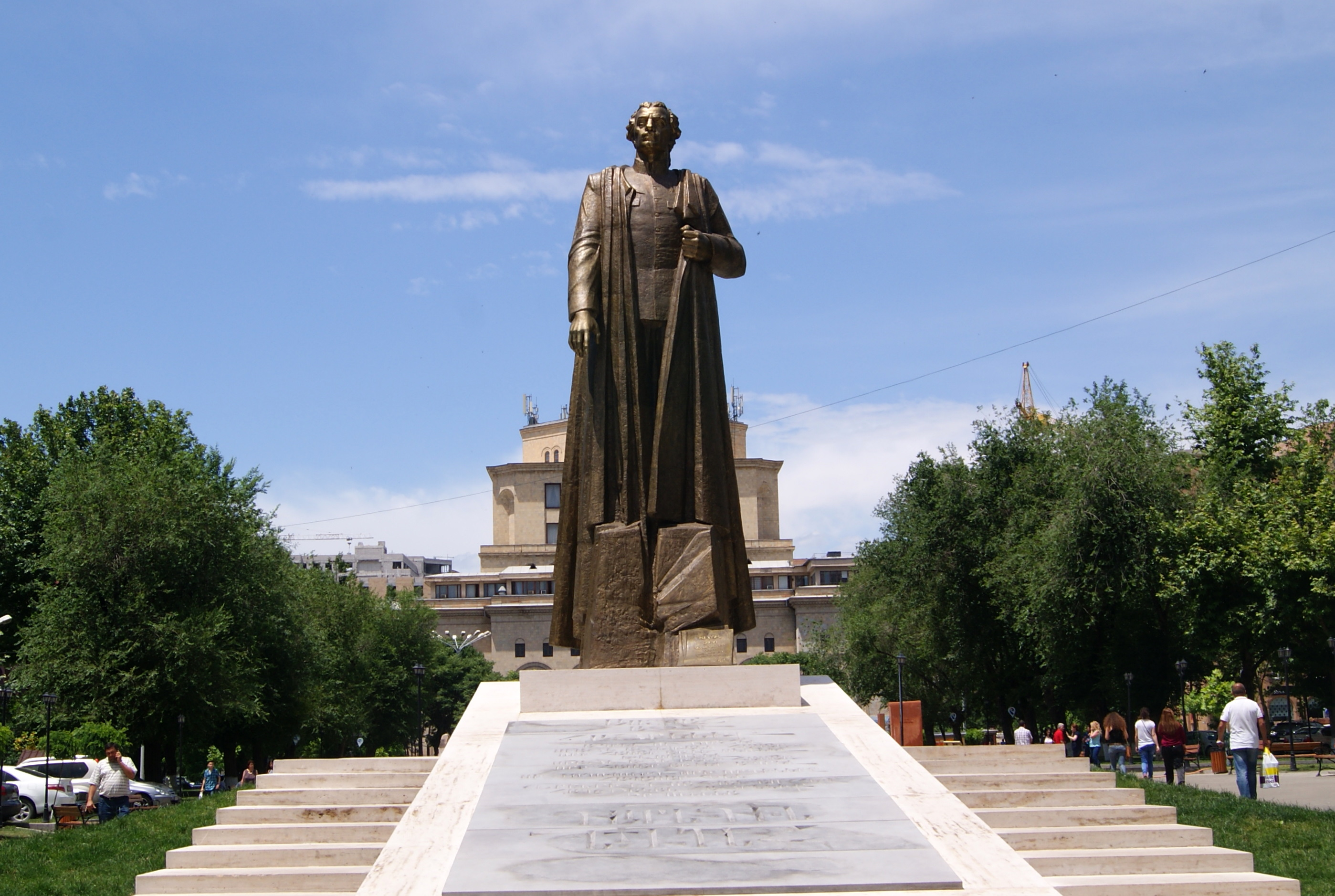
The monumental statue of Nzhdeh in Yerevan, erected in May 2016

On 31 August 1983, Nzhdeh's remains were secretly transferred from Vladimir to rest in Soviet Armenia. This was done through the efforts of Pavel Ananyan, the husband of Nzhdeh's granddaughter, with the help of linguistics professor Varag Arakelyan and others, including Gurgen Armaghanyan, Garegin Mkhitaryan, Artsakh Buniatyan, and Zhora Barseghyan. On 7 October 1983, the right hand of Nzhdeh's body was placed on the slopes of Mount Khustup near Kozni fountain, as Nzhdeh had once expressed the wish "when you find me killed, bury my body at the top of Khustup to let me clearly view Kapan, Gndevaz, Goghtan and Geghvadzor...".

According to the participants of the funeral, the rest of Nzhdeh's body was kept in the cellar of Varag Arakelyan's house in the village of Kotayk until 9 May 1987, when it was secretly transferred to Vayots Dzor and buried in the churchyard of the 14th-century Spitakavor Surb Astvatsatsin Church near Yeghegnadzor. Nzhdeh's gravestone was erected through the efforts of Paruyr Hayrikyan and Movses Gorgisyan on 17 June 1989, a day that later turned into an annual pilgrimage day to the monastery's graveyard.

Decades after his death, on 30 March 1992, Nzhdeh was rehabilitated by Prosecutor General's Office of the newly independent Republic of Armenia.

On 26 April 2005 during the celebration of the 84th anniversary of the Republic of Mountainous Armenia, parts of Nzhdeh's body were taken from the Spitakavor Church to Khustup. Thus, Nzhdeh was reburied for the third time, finally to rest on the slopes of Mount Khustup near Nzhdeh's memorial in Kapan.

In March 2010, Nzhdeh was selected as the "National pride and the most outstanding figure" of Armenians throughout the history by the voters of "We are Armenians" TV project launched by "Hay TV" and broadcast as well by the Public Television of Armenia (H1).

In Yerevan, a public square and metro station are named after Nzhdeh. Nzhdeh, Armenia, a village in the Syunik Province of Armenia, is named after Nzhdeh.

== Controversy ==
After Israeli ambassador Joel Lion denounced a small rally "glorifying" Nzhdeh and called him a "Nazi collaborator" in January 2024, Armenia's Foreign Ministry criticized him for "exploiting" actions based on national and religious intolerance.

== Awards ==
Country	Award		Year
(Tsardom of Bulgaria (1908–1946)) Kingdom of Bulgaria	Order of Bravery	For Bravery	16 November 1912
Russian Empire	Order of St. Vladimir	3rd class	1915, 1918
Russian Empire	Order of St. Anna	4th class	1915
Russian Empire	Cross of St. George	3rd class	1916
Russian Empire	Cross of St. George	2nd class	1916

== Written works ==
=== Publications ===
In 1923, while in Bucharest, Romania, Nzhdeh published a series of articles in the local Armenian newspaper Nor Arshaluys ("New Sunrise") entitled "My word - Why did I take up arms against the Soviet troops?" Nzhdeh wrote in detail about the history of the wars in Syunik (Zangezour) in an extensive series of articles for the Boston newspaper Hairenik ("Homeland") in 1923–1925.

In 1924-1925 he contributed to the ARF newspaper Hayastan ("Armenia") published in Plovdiv, Bulgaria. In 1924, separate chapters from his work Ejer im oragren ("Pages from my diary") were published here, which was published in a separate booklet in Cairo, Egypt, the same year.

In 1926, Nzhdeh wrote for the newspaper Araks based in Sofia, Bulgaria, where he published a series of articles titled "Open Letters to the Armenian Intellectuals".

=== List of literature ===
- Dashnaktsutyun Pantheon, Alexandropol, 1917 (Armenian: Դաշնակցութեան պանթէոնը, Romanized: Dashnaktsutean panteon)
- Military Charter, Yerevan, 1918 (Armenian: Զորաշարժային կանոնադրութիւն, Romanized: Zorasharjayin Kanonadrutyun)
- Khustupian Calls, Goris, 1921 (Armenian: Խուստուփեան կանչեր, Romanized: Khustupean Kancher)
- Pages from my diary, Cairo, Husaber, 1924 (Armenian: Էջեր իմ օրագրէն, Romanized: Ejer im oragren)
- The struggle of sons against fathers, Thessaloniki, 1927 (Armenian: Որդիների պայքարը հայրերի դէմ, Romanized: Vordineri payqary hayreri dem)
- An open letter to the Armenian intelligentsia, Beirut, 1929 (Armenian: Բաց նամակ հայ մտաւորականութեան, Romanized: Bats namak hay mtavorakanutean)
- The Movement of the Spirit of the Nation, Sofia, 1932 (Armenian: Ցեղի ոգու շարժ, Romanized: Tseghi vogu sharj)
- American Armenians. The nation and its scum, Sofia, 1935 (Armenian: Ամերիկահայութիւնը. ցեղը և իր տականքը, Romanized: Amerikahayutiwne: tseghe ew ir takanke)
- My Answer։ The tragedy of Armenia under Turkish-Bolshevik documents, Sofia, Tpagr. P. Palegchian, 1937 (Armenian: Իմ պատասխանը, Romanized: Im pataskhany)
- Autobiography, Sofia, 1944 (Armenian: Ինքնակենսագրություն, Romanized: Inknakensenagrutyun)
- Covenant of Tseghakronism, Yerevan: Hay Dat, 1989 (Armenian: Ցեղակրոնության ուխտ, Romanized: Tseghakronutyan ukht)
- Prison Records, Yerevan, 1993 (Armenian: Բանտային գրառումներ, Romanized: Bantayin grarumner)
- Military regulations. Khustupyan calls, Yerevan, 1993, 56 pages (Armenian: Զորաշարժային կանոնադրություն։ Խուստուփյան կանչեր, Romanized: Zorasharjayin kanonadrutyun: Khustupyan kancher)
- Pages in my diary. An open letter to the Armenian intelligentsia. The struggle of sons against fathers, Yerevan, 1998, 160 pages (Armenian: Էջեր իմ օրագրեն։ Բաց նամակ հայ մտավորականության։ Որդիների պայքարը հայրերի դեմ, Romanized: Ejer im oragren: Bats namak hay mtavorakanutean: Vordineri payqary hayreri dem)
- Covenant of Tseghakronism, Yerevan, 1998, 16 pages (Armenian: Ցեղակրոնության ուխտ, Romanized: Tseghkronutyan ukht)
- The Eternal Weapon of the Tribe, Yerevan, 1998, 87 pages (Armenian: Ցեղի հավիտենական զենքը, Romanized: Tsheghi havitenakan zenq)
- Free Syunik, Beirut, 1999, 176 pages (Armenian: Ազատ Սիւնիք, Romanized: Azat Syunik)
- The struggle for the survival of Mountainous Armenia, Beirut, 1999, 44 pages (Armenian: Լեռնահայաստանի գոյամարտը, Romanized: Lernahayastani goyamart)
- Awakening of the Nation, Yerevan, 1999, 36 pages (Armenian: Ցեղի արթնություն, Romanized: Tseghi artnutyun)
- American-Armenians: the nation and its scum, Yerevan, 2000 (Armenian: Ամերիկահայությունը՝ ցեղը և իր տականքը, Romanized: Amerikahayutiwne: tseghe ew ir takanke)
- The movement of the spirit of the nation, Yerevan, 2000 (Armenian: Ցեղի ոգու շարժը, Romanized: Tseghi vogu sharj)
- The movement of the spirit of the nation. Armenian-Americans: the tribe and its scum, Yerevan, 2000, 118 pages (Armenian: Ցեղի ոգու շարժը։ Ամերիկահայությունը՝ ցեղը և իր տականքը, Romanized: Amerikahayutiwne: tseghe ew ir takanke)
- Tseghakronism as a power of victory. Tribal awakening. What is Tseghakronism, Yerevan, 2001, 48 pages (Armenian: Ցեղակրօնութիւնն իբր յաղթանակի զօրոյթ։ Ցեղային արթնութիւն։ Ինչ է ցեղակրօնութիւնը, Romanized: Tseghakronutyunn ibr haghtanaki xoruyt: Tseghayin artnutyun: Inch e tseghakronutyun)
- Selected, Yerevan, 2001, 405 pages (Armenian: Հատընտիր, Romanized: Hatyntir)
- Pages from my diary. An open letter to the Armenian intelligentsia, Yerevan, 2002, 52 pages (Armenian: Էջեր իմ օրագրեն։ Բաց նամակ հայ մտավորականության, Romanized: Ejer im oragren: Bats namak hay mtavorakanutean)
- Works, volume 1, Yerevan, RA NAS Publishing House, 2002, 532 pages (Armenian: Երկեր, Romanized: Yerker)
- Works, volume 2, Yerevan, RA NAS Publishing House, 2002, 504 pages (Armenian: Երկեր, Romanized: Yerker)
- Collection of letters (1920-1921), Yerevan, 2002, 48 pages (Armenian: Նամականի, Romanized: Namakani)
- Newly discovered relics, Yerevan, 2002, 20 pages (Armenian: Նորահայտ մասունքներ, Romanized: Norahayt masunqner)
- Big idea (newly discovered relics), Yerevan, 2003, 80 pages (Armenian: Մեծ գաղափար (նորահայտ մասունքներ), Romanized: Mets gaghapar (norahayt masunqner))
- The struggle of sons against fathers, Beirut, 2005, 127 pages (Armenian: Որդիների պայքարը հայրերի դէմ, Romanized: Vordineri payqary hayreri dem)
- Selected /second supplemented edition/, Yerevan, 2006, 706 pages (Armenian: Հատընտիր /երկրորդ լրացված հրատարակություն/ Romanized: Hatyntir)
- Open Letter to Michael Arlen, Los Angeles, 2008 (Armenian: Բաց նամակ Մայքլ Արլենին, Romanized: Bats namak Mayql Arlenin)
- To the Armenian Warrior (The Art of Winning), Yerevan, 2010, 64 pages (Armenian: Հայ ռազմիկին (Հաղթելու արվեստը), Romanized: Hay razmikin (Haghtelu arverst))
- Worldview, Yerevan, 2011, 28 pages (Armenian: Աշխարհայեցողություն, Romanized: Ashkharhayetsoghutyun)
- Newly discovered letters, Yerevan, 2011 (Armenian: Նորահայտ նամակներ, Romanized: Norahayt namakner)
- Literary works, Yerevan, 2012, 216 pages (Armenian: Գրական երկեր, Romanized: Grakan erker)
- Prison life. Letters. Posts, Yerevan, 2016, 187 pages (Armenian: Բանտային կյանք։ Նամակներ։ Գրառումներ, Romanized: Bantayin kyanq: Namakner: Grarumner)
- Remember the war. Khustupyan calls, Yerevan, 2017, 148 pages (Armenian: Հիշի՛ր պատերազմը։ Խուստուփյան կանչեր, Romanized: Hishir paterazmy: Khustupean Kancher)
- Selected Works of Garegin Nzhdeh, translated by Eduard Danielyan. Montreal: "Nakhijevan" Institute of Canada 2011

== Secondary literature and popular culture ==
- Avo. Nzhdeh. Beirut, 1968.
- Bantarkeali me hushere: tarapanki tariner G. Nzhdehi het, ed. Armen Sevan. Buenos Aires, 1970.
- Hambardzumyan, Rafael. Nzhdeh: hamarot kensagrakan ev kensataregrutyun. Yerevan, 2006.
- Kevorkian, Vartan. Lernahayastani herosamarte, 1919-1921. Bucharest: Tp. Jahakir, 1923.
- Lalayan, Mushegh. Tseghakron ev Taronakan sharzhumnere: patmutyun ev gaghaparakhosutyun. Yerevan: Hayastani Hanrapetakan kusaktsutyun, 2011.
- Garegin Nzhdeh, published on the occasion of his 110th anniversary, Yerevan 1996.
- Garegin Nzhdeh: Analecta, contains Nzhdeh's ideologies, thoughts, letters, speeches and other writings, Yerevan 2006.

Films

- The Path of the Eternal, by Arthur Babayan and Armen Tevanian.
- Garegin Nzhdeh, a documentary film within the Why Is the Past Still Making Noise? series, produced in 2011 by the Public TV of Armenia.
- Garegin Nzhdeh, film premiered on 28 January 2013 in Yerevan's Moscow Cinema, produced by HK Productions.

== Bibliography ==
- Hovannisian, Richard G. (1982). The Republic of Armenia. Vol. 2: From Versailles to London, 1919–1920. Berkeley: University of California Press. ISBN 978-0520041868.
- Hovannisian, Richard G. (1996b). The Republic of Armenia. Vol. 4: Between Crescent and Sickle: Partition and Sovietization. Berkeley: University of California Press. ISBN 978-0520088047.
