= Güznüt =

- Municipality
- Location within Azerbaijan
- Coordinates: 39°07′39″N 45°31′54″E
- Country: Azerbaijan
- Autonomous republic: Nakhchivan
- District: Babek

Population (2005)
  - Total: 1,563
- Time zone: UTC+4 (AZT)

Güznüt is a village and municipality in the Babek District of the Nakhchivan Autonomous Republic in Azerbaijan. The village is located on a plain 10 kilometres (6.2 miles) from the city of Nakhchivan, on the left side of the Nakhchivan-Julfa highway. The local economy is mainly based on grain-growing and animal husbandry. There is a secondary school, club, mosque and a medical center in the village. It has a population of 1,563. The village had an Armenian majority prior to the Muslim uprisings in Kars and Sharur–Nakhichevan.

== Name ==
In the Nakhchivan dialect of Armenian, Kznut means "plum place". The village was named because of the autumn sowing which is carried out in this area.

== Culture ==
There were several ancient churches in the village, an Armenian cemetery with medieval khachkars, but after the Armenian-Azerbaijani war in 1918-1920, the village was cleansed of its Armenian population, and these monuments were subsequently destroyed. A mosque was built in the village in 1986–1992.

== Notable natives ==
- Garegin Nzhdeh - (1886–1955) Armenian commander and national hero.
