= George Hoggart Toulmin =

English physician and geologist

George Hoggart Toulmin (1754 – July 1817) was an English physician and writer who examined geology and planetary history. He was among the first to suggest that the earth was undergoing constant change, contrary to Aristotelian ideas of a planet unchanged since creation.

Toulmin was born in Southwark and studied medicine at the University of Edinburgh where he was influenced by John Brown. His MD thesis for 1779 was De cynanche tonsillari. He worked in Sussex and the West Midlands. His geology works were The antiquity and duration of the world (1780) which went into a second edition as The antiquity of the world (1783) and a third edition The eternity of the world (1785). He also wrote The eternity of the universe (1789). His work rejected earlier ideas which had essentially based themselves in interpretations of the Old Testament. He noted that there was constant motion, decay, erosion, the deposition of fossil bearing sediment and the erosion of mountains and suggested that they may be formed also by elevation. His ideas on earth dynamics preceded those of James Hutton who independently proposed similar ideas in Theory of the Earth (1788). Toulmin was also interested in the nature of human civilization and wondered if the processes that worked on the earth might also have similarly affected humans. Toulmin's works were largely ignored, or even actively suppressed by contemporaries like Charles Lyell, until the Russian geologist S.I. Tomkieff noted in 1948, the similarities of Toulmin's ideas to those of Hutton. Some had suggested plagiarism by Hutton but these have been dismissed by others.
