= Joshua Toulmin Smith =

British political theorist (1816–1869)

- Born: 29 May 1816; Birmingham, West Midlands, England
- Died: 28 April 1869 (aged 52); Lancing, West Sussex, England
- Occupations: Political theorist, lawyer, local historian

Joshua Toulmin Smith (29 May 1816 – 28 April 1869) was a British political theorist, lawyer and local historian of Birmingham.

Born in Birmingham as Joshua Smith, the son of William Hawkes Smith (1786–1840), an economic and educational reformer, radical and Unitarian. He moved to London in 1835 and pursued a career in law, studying at Lincoln's Inn. Smith was not called to the bar until 1849, as he interrupted his legal studies to settle between 1837 and 1842 with his new wife Martha in America where he lectured on philosophy and phrenology. Joshua Smith was an incessant writer. In 1839 he gained a diploma of the Royal Society of Antiquaries of Copenhagen for his work The Northmen in New England, or, America in the Tenth Century while his interest in geology and subsequent papers led to him being offered the position of President of the newly formed Geologists' Association, but other than delivering the inaugural speech, he did very little. However, the main focus of his writings for many years was as a proponent of local self-government through traditional institutions, such as the parish, the vestry and the ward, a subject also taken up by his daughter Lucy Toulmin Smith. After the cholera epidemic of 1847, Smith's knowledge of law combined with his involvement in his own Highgate neighbourhood led to his demanding better sanitation and reforms advocating devolution and local responsibility. In 1851 his work Local Self-Government and Centralisation was published and followed in 1854 by The Parish and its Obligations and Powers.

In 1852 Smith refused an offer to stand for the Parliamentary seat of Sheffield at the UK general election of that year. In 1854, he joined forces with the Revd M. W. Malet and W. J. Evelyn (MP for Surrey) to form the Anti-Centralisation Union, which survived until 1857. That same year, he incorporated "Toulmin" into his surname, in reference to his great-grandfather Joshua Toulmin.

In the mid-19th century the radical Local Self-Government movement was prominent among middle class professionals such as Smith who looked back to the Anglo-Saxons as an example of lifestyle and self-government. A vision of the Anglo-Saxons as symbolic of liberty, freedom and mutual responsibility was promoted and Smith pursued this argument tirelessly. History has proved, he argued, that "local Self-Government did exist in England and was a force to keep in check the most ambitious monarchs". This view was based in part on interpretation of medieval documents such as the Domesday Book (a survey of property in England compiled under the orders of William the Conqueror in 1086). In The Parish, Smith describes the Domesday Book as "a record of the action of the institutions of Local Self-Government of a free people".

Smith's mistrust of Parliament led to the establishment of the Parliamentary Remembrancer (1857–1865), a weekly journal which recorded the actions of Parliamentary sessions for the benefit of local authorities and the general public. However, the Remembrancer was also used to instruct. For example, Smith gave much space and enthusiasm to a project in 1861 to reproduce Domesday Book as individual counties using a new photographic process called photozincography under the supervision of Sir Henry James at the Ordnance Survey. In the Remembrancer Smith promoted Domesday Book as being the story of free Englishmen in a free England and expressed a desire that every man who cared about the well-being of his country should possess a copy and be familiar with its content. He actively encouraged subscribers and accused gentlemen who did not subscribe to the photo-zincographic Domesday of being unpatriotic and benighted.

The laborious task of conducting the Remembrancer combined with Smith's other responsibilities including his legal practice has been blamed for his deteriorating health. Smith drowned in 1869 at Lancing, West Sussex.

== Archives ==
A collection of letters between Smith and Birmingham printer William Hodgetts is held at the Cadbury Research Library, University of Birmingham.

== Related collections ==
- 1285–1870: deeds, correspondence and papers, chiefly concerning the Old Crown Inn, Deritend are housed at Birmingham: Archives and Heritage Service.
- 1836–51: correspondence with George Combe housed at the National Library of Scotland, Manuscript Collections.
- 1862–67: correspondence with George Holyoake housed at the National Co-operative Archive.
- 1852–61: letters from F. W. Newman housed at the British Library, Manuscript Collections.
- 1847–1866: letters (31) correspondence with Sir Richard Owen and William Clift housed at the Natural History museum.
- Toulmin-Smith, Joshua (1870). English Gilds; ordinances of over 100 English Gilds, with the usages of Winchester, Worcester, Bristol etc.

== See also ==
- Lucy Toulmin Smith
