= Lucy Toulmin Smith =

Anglo-American antiquarian scholar and librarian (1838–1911)

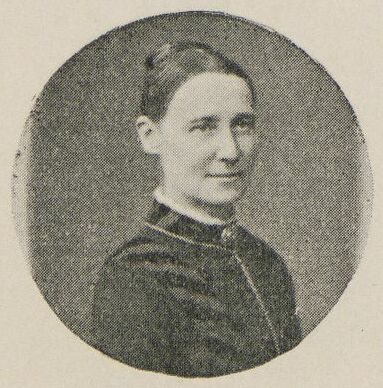
Toulmin Smith in 1899

Lucy Toulmin Smith (1838–1911) was an Anglo-American antiquarian and librarian, known for her first publication of the York Mystery Plays and other early works.

== Life ==
Toulmin Smith was born at Boston, Massachusetts, USA, on 21 November 1838, of English parents, Joshua Toulmin Smith and his wife Martha. She was the eldest child of a family of three daughters and two sons. In 1842 the Toulmin Smiths returned to England and settled in Highgate, Middlesex. She was educated at home, and went on to assist her father in editing his journal the Parliamentary Remembrancer (1857–65). After his death she completed his volume English Gilds, adding her own introduction.

Subsequently she edited many other important early documents, in some cases also translating from the French. She was a close friend of Mary Kingsley and helped her in her literary work. She collaborated with many scholars of all nationalities, such as James Gairdner. She also contributed to the girls' magazine Atalanta, edited by L. T. Meade, who was the wife of her brother Alfred.

In 1893 Manchester College opened new buildings in Oxford. The library housed valuable collections of books, but had no librarian, until in September 1894 Toulmin Smith was appointed. In addition to the ordinary running of the library, she took pains to build up collections of special relevance to the college's nonconformist heritage. Thus she completed James Martineau's set of the papers of the Metaphysical Society (1869–80). Likewise she built up almost complete runs of periodicals of interest to Unitarians as the annual reports of the British and Foreign Unitarian Association, and the unitarian journal The Inquirer. Meanwhile, her own scholarly work continued with numerous publications.

She died in Oxford on 18 December 1911.

== Published works ==
- Lucy Toulmin Smith (1870). introduction. English Gilds: TheOriginal Ordinances of more than one hundred Early English Gilds: together with Þe olde Usages of Þe Cite of Wynchestre; The Ordinances of Worcester; The Office of the Mayor of Bristol; and The Costomary of the Manor of Tettenhall-Regis. By Joshua Toulmin Smith. London: N. Trubner & Co.
- Lucy Toulmin Smith, ed. (1872). The Maire of Bristowe is Kalendar, by Robert Ricart, Town Clerk of Bristol 18 Edward IV. Camden Society.
- C. M. Ingelby (1879). Lucy Toulmin Smith (ed.). Shakespeare's Centurie of Prayse; Being Materials for a History of Opinion on Shakespeare and His Works A.D. 1591-1693. New Shakspere Society.
- Thomas Norton; Thomas Sackville (1883). Lucy Toulmin Smith (ed.). Gorboduc, or Ferrex and Porrex: A Tragedy.
- Lucy Toulmin Smith (1885). York Plays: the Plays performed by the Crafts or Mysteries of York on the Day of Corpus Christi in the 14th, 15th, and 16th Centuries. Oxford: Clarendon Press.
- Lucy Toulmin Smith (1886). A Common-place Book of the Fifteenth Century: Containing a Religious Play and Poetry, Legal Forms, and Local Accounts. BiblioBazaar, LLC. ISBN 978-1-110-08120-2. The "religious play" referred to is The Brome play of Abraham and Isaac, which LTS first published.
- Lucy Toulmin Smith; Paul Meyer, eds. (1889). Les contes moralisés de Nicole Bozon, frère mineur. Publiés pour la première fois d'après les manuscrits de Londres et de Cheltenham. Librairie de Firmin Didot et Cie.
- J. J. Jusserand (1889). English Wayfaring Life In The Middle Ages (XIVth Century). Translated by Lucy Toulmin Smith. T. Fisher Unwin.
- Lucy Toulmin Smith, ed. (1894). Expeditions to Prussia and the Holy Land made by Henry earl of Derby … in … 1390–1 and 1392–3. Camden Society.
- Lucy Toulmin Smith (1906). The Itinerary in Wales of John Leland. BiblioBazaar, LLC. ISBN 978-1-110-67980-5.
- Lucy Toulmin Smith (1907–1910). The Itinerary of John Leland in or about the Years 1535-1543. George Bell and Son. (four volumes)
