= List of political theorists =

A political theorist is someone who engages in constructing or evaluating political theory, including political philosophy. Theorists may be academics or independent scholars.

== Ancient ==
- Aristotle
- Chanakya
- Cicero
- Confucius
- Mencius
- Plato
- Socrates

== Medieval ==
- al-Farabi
- Dante Alighieri
- Averroes
- Thomas Aquinas
- Ibn Khaldun
- John of Salisbury
- Maimonides
- Muhammad
- William of Ockham

== Renaissance and early modern ==
- Jeremy Bentham
- Edmund Burke
- Benjamin Franklin
- Hugo Grotius
- Johann Gottfried von Herder
- Thomas Hobbes
- Immanuel Kant
- John Locke
- Niccolò Machiavelli
- James Madison
- John Milton
- Thomas More
- Montesquieu
- Samuel von Pufendorf
- Adam Smith
- Jean-Jacques Rousseau

== Late modern ==
- Muhammad Asad
- Hayk Asatryan
- Mikhail Bakunin
- Frédéric Bastiat
- Samuel Taylor Coleridge
- Juan Donoso Cortés
- Émile Durkheim
- Friedrich Engels
- Julius Evola
- René Guénon
- William Godwin
- Emma Goldman
- Friedrich Hayek
- Georg Wilhelm Friedrich Hegel
- Theodor Herzl
- Peter Kropotkin
- Muhammad Iqbal
- Rose Wilder Lane
- Gustave Le Bon
- Vladimir Lenin
- György Lukács
- Rosa Luxemburg
- Joseph de Maistre
- Herbert Marcuse
- Charles Maurras
- Karl Marx
- John Stuart Mill
- Adam Müller
- Thomas Paine
- Pierre-Joseph Proudhon
- Vinayak Damodar Savarkar
- Joseph Schumpeter
- Oswald Spengler
- Lysander Spooner
- Max Stirner
- Leo Strauss
- Leon Trotsky
- Alexis de Tocqueville
- Max Weber
- Mary Wollstonecraft

== Born in 20th century ==
- Theodor Adorno
- Tariq Ali
- Louis Althusser
- Gabriel Almond
- Hannah Arendt
- Raymond Aron
- Kenneth Arrow
- Isaiah Berlin
- Murray Bookchin
- Wendy Brown
- James Burnham
- Cornelius Castoriadis
- Noam Chomsky
- Dobrica Ćosić
- Robert Dahl
- Raya Dunayevskaya
- Ronald Dworkin
- David Easton
- Frantz Fanon
- Nancy Fraser
- Michael Freeden
- Betty Friedan
- David D. Friedman
- Erich Fromm
- Francis Fukuyama
- Muammar Gaddafi
- Antonio Gramsci
- Che Guevara
- Amy Gutmann
- Jürgen Habermas
- Ho Chi Minh
- Hans-Hermann Hoppe
- C. L. R. James
- Ruhollah Khomeini
- Russell Kirk
- Leszek Kołakowski
- Erik von Kuehnelt-Leddihn
- Will Kymlicka
- Ernesto Laclau
- Ali Latifiyan
- Alasdair MacIntyre
- Harvey Mansfield
- Chantal Mouffe
- Antonio Negri
- Robert Nozick
- Martha Nussbaum
- Michael Oakeshott
- Karl Popper
- Robert D. Putnam
- Sayyid Qutb
- Ayn Rand
- John Rawls
- Michael Walzer
- Murray Rothbard
- Wilhelm Röpke
- Prabhat Ranjan Sarkar
- Mark Satin
- James C. Scott
- Carl Schmitt
- Roger Scruton
- Charles Taylor
- Eric Voegelin
- Simone Weil
- John Zerzan
- Howard Zinn

== See also ==
- Political science
- Political scientist
- Politics
- List of political philosophers
