= Military career of Mustafa Kemal Atatürk =

Mustafa Kemal Atatürk 1317 (1901)-P. 8
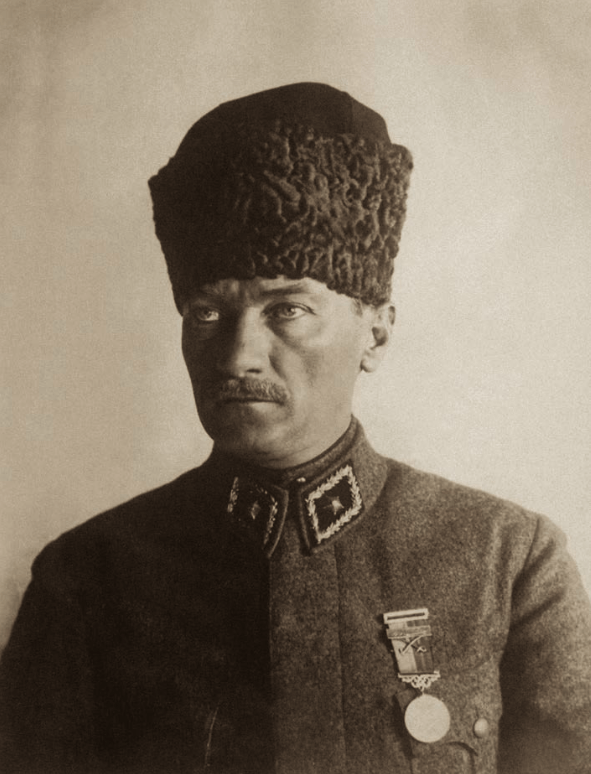
- Mustafa Kemal Pasha in 1923
- Born: 1881; Salonica (Thessaloniki), Ottoman Empire
- Died: 10 November 1938 (aged 56–57); Dolmabahçe Palace, Istanbul, Turkey
- Military career
- Allegiance: Ottoman Empire; Turkey
- Service years: 1893 – 8 July 1919, 5 August 1921 – 1927
- Rank: Empire: Mirliva (Brigadier General); Republic: Mareşal (Field Marshal)
- Commands: 19th Division – XVI Corps – 2nd Army – 7th Army – Yildirim Army Group – Ninth Army Troops Inspectorate
- Conflicts: Italo-Turkish War; Battle of Tobruk; Battle of Derna; First Balkan War; Battle of Bulair; Second Balkan War; Siege of Adrianople; Capture of Didymoteicho; World War I; Landing at Anzac Cove; Landing at Suvla Bay; Battle for Baby 700; Battle for No.3 Post; Battle of the Nek; Battle of Chunuk Bair; Battle of Scimitar Hill; Battle of Hill 60 (Gallipoli); Battle of Sari Bair; Battle of Bitlis; Battle of Muş; Battle of Çapakçur; Charge at Haritan; Greco-Turkish War; Battle of the Sakarya; Great Offensive; Battle of Dumlupınar
- Awards: List (24 medals)
- Other work: President of the Republic of Turkey

Pre-World War I

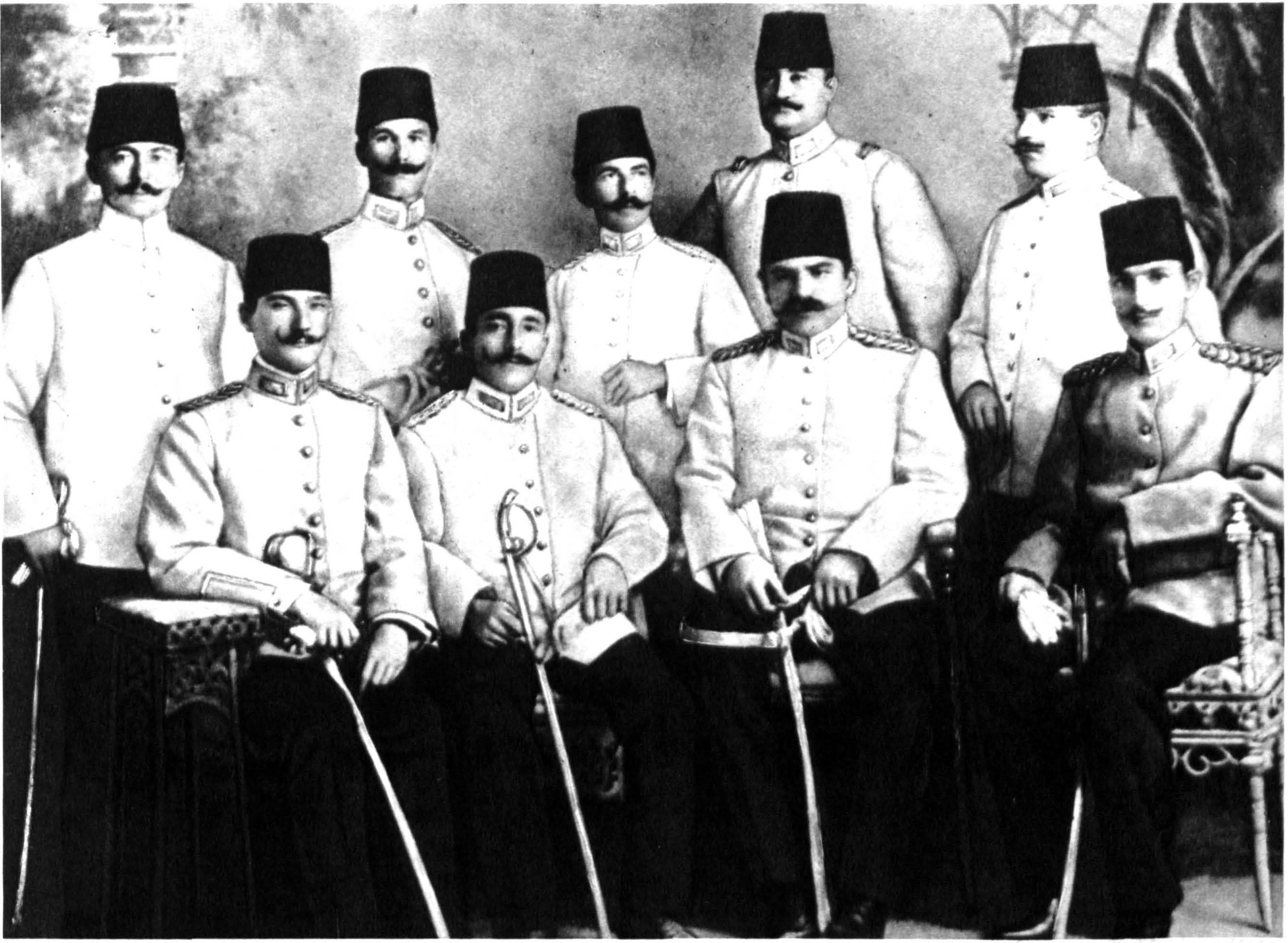
Ottoman officers of the Fifth Army at Beirut. Mustafa Kemal Atatürk is sitting on the left in the front row.

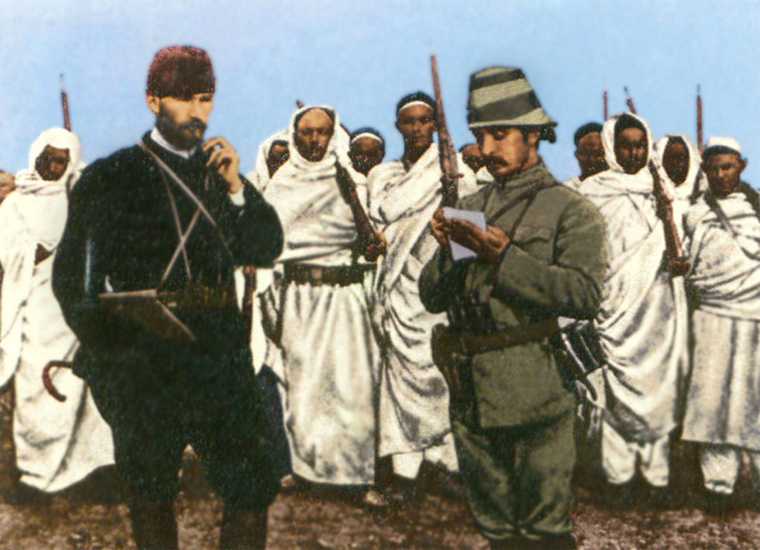
Commanding Libyan fighters against Italian occupation, 1911

Mustafa Kemal Atatürk (1881 – 10 November 1938) was a field marshal, revolutionary statesman, and founder of the Republic of Turkey as well as its first president. Mustafa Kemal Atatürk's military career explains his life between graduation from Ottoman War College in Istanbul as a lieutenant in 1905 to his resignation from the Ottoman Army on 8 July 1919, as well as his military leadership throughout the subsequent Turkish War of Independence (armistice 11 October 1922).

== Early years ==
=== Staff captain at Fifth Army (1905–1907) ===
Mustafa Kemal graduated from the Ottoman Military Staff College as a staff captain (Kurmay Yüzbaşı) in 1905 and was assigned to the Fifth Army based in Damascus. There he soon joined a small secret revolutionary society of reformist officers called "Motherland and Liberty" (Turkish: Vatan ve Hürriyet) and became an active opponent to the regime of Abdülhamid II.

=== Senior captain at Third Army (1907–1910) ===
In 1907, he was promoted to the rank of senior captain (Kolağası) and assigned to the Third Army in Monastir (now Bitola, North Macedonia). During this period he joined the Committee of Union and Progress (CUP).

In 1908, the Young Turk Revolution seized power from the then reigning Sultan Abdülhamid II and Mustafa Kemal became a senior military figure. As one of the first members of the CUP, he played a role in the revolution of 1908. He was deployed to Tripolitanya where he unsuccessfully attempted to persuade the local Arab notables of the policies of the CUP. However, in later years he became known for his opposition to, and frequent criticism of, policies pursued by the CUP leadership. Soon thereafter, Mustafa Kemal's relationship with Enver Pasha deteriorated.

=== Ministry of War (1910–1911) ===
In 1910, Atatürk took part in the army maneuvers in Picardy, France, and in 1911 he entered service at the Ministry of War (Turkish: Harbiye Nezareti) in Constantinople (now Istanbul).

== Italo-Turkish War (1911–1912) ==
Later in 1911, he volunteered to fight in the Italo-Turkish war in the Ottoman Vilayet of Tripolitania (present-day Libya) to oppose the Italian invasion. Following the successful defense of Tobruk on 22 December 1911, he was appointed commander of the forces at Derna on 6 March 1912.

== Balkan Wars (1912–1913) ==
He returned to Istanbul following the outbreak of the Balkan Wars in October 1912. During the First Balkan War, Mustafa Kemal fought against the Bulgarian army at Gallipoli and Bulair (Bolayır) on the coast of Thrace. He also played a crucial role in the recapture of Adrianople (Edirne) and Didymoteicho during the Second Balkan War.

== World War I ==
World War I

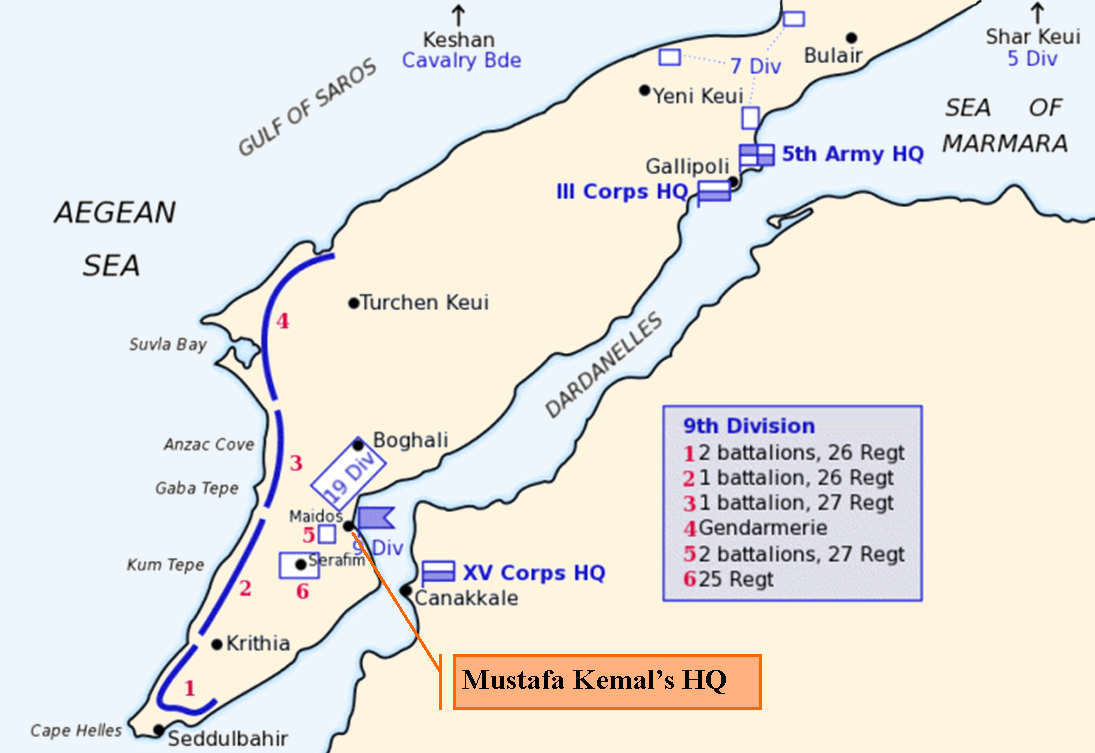
The 19th division at the Battle of Gallipoli, with which he confronted nearly all of the Allied landings

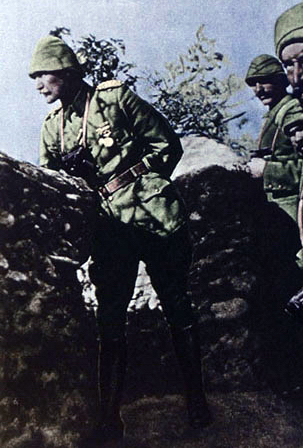
In Gallipoli with his soldiers, 1915

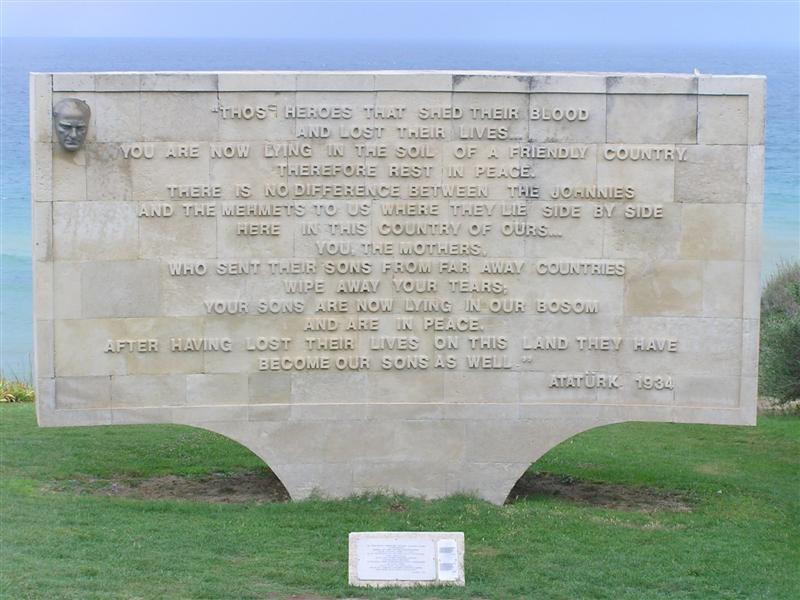
Words of Atatürk on the monument at Anzac Cove

At Diyarbakır and took the command of the XVI Corps of the Ottoman Second Army.

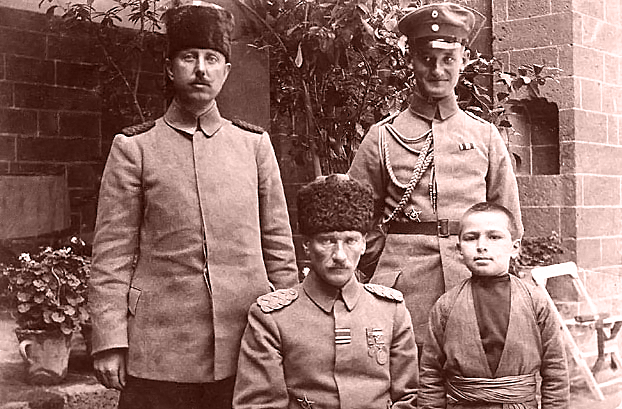
From left to right: Fuat (Bulca), Mustafa Kemal, German artillery advisor von Berk, Abdurrahim (Tuncak, adopted son)

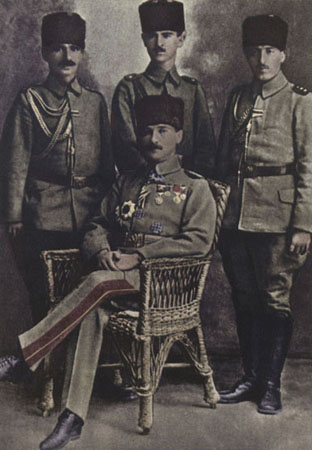
Commander of the Seventh Army Mustafa Kemal Pasha with his adjutant officers; right to left: Salih (Bozok), Şükrü (Tezer), and Cevat Abbas (Gürer), 1918, Aleppo.

Arrived to the capital during the Allied occupation of Istanbul. There he famously declared that the Allied Powers "will leave just as they have come."

=== Military attaché at Sofia (1913–1914) ===
In 1913, he was appointed military attaché to Sofia, in part because Enver Pasha viewed him as a potential rival and sought to curtail his involvement in any political intrigue in Istanbul. By March 1914, whilst serving in Sofia, he was promoted to the rank of lieutenant colonel. While in Sofia, he became a vocal critic of Empire's entry into the war on Germany's side. On 16 July 1914, he sent an official dispatch from Sofia to the Ministry of War in Constantinople, urging a policy of neutrality in the event of war, with a view to possible later intervention against the Central Powers. However, Enver Pasha, the Minister of War, favored an alliance with Germany, leading to a secret alliance treaty being signed between the two governments. The Ottoman Empire eventually entered the First World War on Germany's side.

=== Battle of Gallipoli, 1915–1916 ===
The German Marshal Otto Liman von Sanders was assigned to defend the Dardanelles in command of the Fifth Army. Mustafa Kemal was given the task of organizing and commanding the 19th Division attached to the Fifth Army. On 8 January 1915, the British War Council launched an operation "to bombard and take the Gallipoli peninsula with Istanbul as its objective".

British naval attacks, however, failed to break through the Dardanelles Strait and the British decided to support their fleet with a land attack. The land campaign took place between 25 April 1915, and 9 January 1916. With his division stationed in Gallipoli, Mustafa Kemal found himself at the centre of the Allies' attempts to force their way onto the peninsula.

On 25 April 1915, the Australian and New Zealand Army Corps (ANZAC) forces were to move inland after landing their troops at Anzac Cove, but were soon met with a Turkish counterattack, commanded by Mustafa Kemal. Mustafa Kemal engaged the enemy forces on the hills, held them and retook the high ground. Largely due to him and his command, the ANZAC forces were contained, and could not attain their objectives.

Before the encounter between the two forces, Mustafa Kemal told his troops:

I don’t order you to fight, I order you to die. In the time it takes us to die, other troops and commanders can come and take our places.

— Mustafa Kemal

By nightfall the ANZACs had suffered 2,000 casualties and were fighting to remain on the beach. For the following two weeks the Allies failed to advance and lost one third of their force. Because he had successfully held off the Allied forces at Conkbayırı (Chunuk Bair), Mustafa Kemal was promoted to the rank of colonel during the early stages of the land campaign. The second stage of the Gallipoli campaign, which began on 6 August, placed Mustafa Kemal only three hundred meters (approximately 330 yards) away from the firing line. He was also the Turkish commander assigned to many of the major battles throughout the Gallipoli campaign, such as the Battle of Chunuk Bair, Battle of Scimitar Hill and the Battle of Sari Bair.

The Gallipoli campaign became a disastrous defeat for the Allies as they were pinned down by the Turks for ten months of incessant fighting and were unable to advance past the low-lying beaches of Gallipoli. The Allies finally decided to call off the offensive and successfully evacuated their troops. On the Ottoman Empire's side, Otto Liman von Sanders (Fifth Army) and several other Turkish commanders attained significant achievements in their role in the defense of the Turkish Straits. However, Mustafa Kemal became the outstanding front-line commander and gained much respect from his former enemies for his chivalry in victory. The Mustafa Kemal Atatürk Memorial has an honoured role during ANZAC Day parades in Canberra, Australia. Mustafa Kemal's speech commemorating the loss of the hundreds of thousands of Turkish and Anzac soldiers who perished during the Gallipoli campaign is inscribed on a monument at Anzac Cove:

"Those heroes who shed their blood and lost their lives … you are now lying in the soil of a friendly country. Therefore rest in peace. There is no difference between the Johnnies and the Mehmets to us where they lie side by side here in this country of ours… You, the mothers who sent their sons from far away countries, wipe away your tears. Your sons are now lying in our bosom and are in peace. After having lost their lives on this land, they have become our sons as well."

=== Caucasus Campaign, 1916–1917 ===
Following the Battle of Gallipoli, Mustafa Kemal first served in Adrianople (Edirne) until 14 January 1916. He was assigned to the command of the XVI Corps of the Second Army and sent to Diyarbakır to take part in the Caucasus Campaign. He was promoted to the rank of brigadier general on 1 April.

When Mustafa Kemal was assigned to his new post, the Second Army was facing the Russian army under General Tovmas Nazarbekian, the detachment of Armenian volunteer units commanded by Andranik Ozanian and the Armenian irregular units which were in constant advance. After the Siege of Van an Armenian provisional government under the leadership of Aram Manukian was formed with a progressive autonomous region. The Armenian administration had grown from its initial set-up around Lake Van. The initial stages of the Battle of Bitlis and the Battle of Muş were already developed. On arrival Kemal found chaotic conditions. The region was inhospitable at the best of times. Communication lines were under insurgency attacks. Hundreds of thousands of refugees, many of them Kurds, which had bitter relations with Armenian units, came flooding in front of the advancing Russian armies. Mustafa Kemal's initial task was to bring order to the frightened people so that his corps could function during this period of human suffering.

The massive Russian offensive reached the Anatolian key cities of Erzurum, Bitlis and Muş. On 7 August, Mustafa Kemal rallied his troops and mounted a counteroffensive. He had so strengthened the morale of his force, following its defeat, that within five days, two of his divisions captured not only Bitlis but the equally important town of Muş, greatly disturbing the calculations of the Russian Command. Emil Lengyel wrote: "He demonstrated anew that the Turk was a fine soldier if he was given the right leadership. Again the Turks took note of the uncommon competence of a general whose name was 'Perfection'".

However, Izzet Pasha, on the other parts of the front, failed to match these successes. In September, Mustafa Kemal retreated from Muş under the heavy advance of the Russian Army and Armenian volunteer units. However, Mustafa Kemal could claim the only Turkish victory in a round of defeats. He also concentrated on the strategic goal of confining the enemy within the mountainous region. That same year, as a recognition of his military achievements and his success in improving the stability of the region, he was given the medal Golden Sword of the Order of "Imtiyaz". By November 1916, he was promoted to the post of a deputy commander of the Second Army as its commander Ahmet Izzet Pasha was in Constantinople.

On 7 March 1917, Mustafa Kemal was appointed from the command of the XVI Corps to the overall command of the Second Army. Meanwhile, the Russian Revolution erupted and the Caucasus front of the Czar's armies disintegrated. Mustafa Kemal had already left the region being assigned to another fighting front.

=== Sinai and Palestine Campaign, 1917–1918 ===
His command of the Second Army was cut short, as he was transferred to the Sinai and Palestine Campaign. He was assigned the command of the Seventh Army. After a short visit to the Seventh Army headquarters, he returned to Constantinople on 7 October. He joined the crown prince Mehmed Vahdettin (later Sultan Mehmed VI) on a visit to Germany. During this trip he fell ill and stayed in Vienna for medical treatment.

He returned to Aleppo on 28 August 1918, and resumed the command of the Seventh Army. His headquarters were in Nablus, Palestine. Like in Gallipoli, he was under the command of General Liman von Sanders, whose group headquarters was in Nazareth. Mustafa Kemal studied Syria thoroughly once again and visited the frontline. His conclusion was that Syria was in a pitiful state (the 1915–1917 period had left 500,000 Syrian casualties to famine). There was no Ottoman civil governor or commander. There was an abundance of British propaganda and British secret agents were everywhere. The local population hated the Ottoman government and looked forward to the arrival of the British troops as soon as possible. The enemy was stronger than his own forces in terms of men and equipment. To describe the desperate situation, he said "we are like a cotton thread drawn across their path".

Mustafa Kemal also had to deal with the Arab Revolt, organized by Great Britain which encouraged the local Arabs to revolt against Turkish rule. Liman von Sanders lost the Battle of Megiddo, leaving 75,000 POW behind, on the first day alone. Now, nothing stood between General Allenby's forces and Mustafa Kemal's Seventh Army. Concluding that he didn't have enough men to encounter the British forces, Mustafa Kemal retreated towards Jordan to establish a stronger defensive line. In a couple of days, the total number of the deserters reached 300,000. Mustafa Kemal's war was changed drastically from fighting against the Allies to fighting against the disintegration of his own forces. He sent a furious telegram to Sultan:

The withdrawal … could have been carried out in some order, if a fool like Enver Paşa had not been the director-general of the operations, if we did not have an incompetent commander—Cevat Paşa—at the head of a military force of five to ten thousand men, who fled at the first sound of gunfire, abandoned his army, and wandered around like a bewildered chicken; and the commander of the Fourth army, Cemal Paşa, ever incapable of analyzing a military situation; and if, above all, we did not have a group headquarters (under Liman von Sanders) which lost all control from the first day of the battle. Now, there is nothing left to do but to make peace.

— Mustafa Kemal

Mustafa Kemal was appointed to the command of Thunder Groups Command (Turkish: Yıldırım Orduları Gurubu), replacing Liman von Sanders. In the autumn of 1918 allied forces, having captured Jerusalem, prepared for their final lightning offensive under General Allenby on the Palestine front, in the words of an Arab historian to sweep Turks "like thistledown before the wind". Mustafa Kemal established his headquarters at Katma and succeeded in regaining control of the situation. He deployed his troops along a new defensive line at the south of Aleppo, and managed to resist at the mountains. He stopped the advancing British forces (last engagements of the campaign). Kinross wrote:

Once again the Turkish hero of the campaign was Mustafa Kemal, who, after a masterly strategic retreat to the heights of Aleppo, found himself in command of the remnants of the Ottoman forces now defending the soil of Turkey itself, of which it was the natural frontier. They were still undefeated when news was received of the signature of an armistice between Britain and Turkey—leaving him, at the end of the struggle, the sole Turkish commander without a defeat to his name. Behind him were those Anatolian homelands of the Turkish race, where his future destiny and that of his people lay.

— Lord Kinross

Mustafa Kemal's position became the base line for the Armistice of Mudros. There were regions, such as Yemen, which was still under the Ottoman control at the time of armistice. Kemal's last active service to the Ottoman Army was organizing the return of the troops that were left behind the south of his line.

== Ministry of War (1918–1919) ==
On 30 October 1918 the Ottomans capitulated to the Allies with the Armistice of Mudros. Beginning with the armistice, the creation of the modern Arab world and Turkey began. At the end of the war, Mustafa Kemal was 37 years old. In the final stages of WWI, he was assigned to command the largest remaining Ottoman Army division, the Thunder Groups Command. After the armistice, however, Thunder Groups Command was dissolved, and Mustafa Kemal returned to an occupied Constantinople on 13 November 1918.

The Occupation of Constantinople began before the Ottoman Army's leading officers, such as Mustafa Kemal on 13 November 1918, Kazim Karabekir on 28 November 1918, İsmet İnönü, and others returned to Istanbul. Mustafa Kemal found himself surrounded with conditions in Istanbul that he fought to prevent. The "dark days of the armistice" was the common saying among the Muslim members of the Empire. He met with Rauf Bey and the Grand Vizier Ahmet Izzet Pasha. He wanted to resign from the army. Ahmet Izzet Pasha persuaded him to stay. He was given an administrative position at the Ministry of War (Harbiye Nezareti). Ahmet Izzet Pasha's term ended sharply and replaced by Tevfik Pasha on 18 November. High Commissioner Admiral Somerset Arthur Gough-Calthorpe was assigned as the Allied military adviser to Constantinople. His first task was to arrest some thirty former members of the CUP on 29/30 January 1919. They were taken to Bekiraga Bolugu, the military detention center. Mustafa Kemal was not one of them. The Ottoman government needed respected officers to control the army. Older generals, such as Abdullah Pasha, could not control the army. The war minister Cevat Cobanli, declared that serving officers could not form associations and Mustafa Kemal claiming to advocate political neutrality of the armed forces was not perceived as a threat.

== General inspector (19 May 1919 – 8 July 1919) ==
Mustafa Kemal's active participation in the national resistance movement began with his assignment as a general inspector to the 9th Army by the Sultan Mehmed VI. His task was to oversee the demobilization of remaining Ottoman military units and nationalist organizations. He received civil and military authority over the provinces of Sivas, Trabzon, Erzurum and Van as well as the sanjak of Samsun. On 19 May 1919, he departed from Constantinople to Samsun on board the ferry Bandırma. 19 May is accepted as the beginning of Turkish War of Independence or more precisely onset of the initial organization of oppositions under his leadership. However, the British, who had better intelligence, were alarmed when they learned that Mustafa Kemal had become Inspector General, as they believed that Mustafa Kemal had nationalist ideals. A British detachment entered and searched for documents in his mother's house where he was residing at the time. The British were correct in their suspicions, as Mustafa Kemal at the time was meeting in that house with the Ottoman Army generals and commanders who were to become leaders in the coming war. The regular guests of this house included Kâzim (Karabekir), Ali Fuat, İsmet (İnönü). Britain urged the Sultan to recall Kemal. Thanks to friends and sympathizers in government circles, a compromise was worked out whereby the power of the Inspector General was curbed. As a result, Inspector General became a title that had no power, at least on paper.

The occupations had already generated disorganised local oppositions by numerous militant resistance groups. The establishment of an organised national movement against the occupying forces was the first goal in Mustafa Kemal's mind. The General Inspector position created an ideal situation in organising the resistance. He contacted local leaders, provincial governors and military commanders calling them to resist the occupations instead of trying to disarm the military units. In June 1919, he and his close friends issued the Amasya Circular, which stated that the independence of the country was in danger, since the Ottoman government in Istanbul was subject to foreign control the nation had to save itself by its own will and sources.

On 23 June High Commissioner Admiral Calthorpe, realizing the significance of Mustafa Kemal's discreet activities in Anatolia, sent a report about Kemal to the Foreign Office. His remarks were down played by George Kidson of the Eastern Department. Captain Hurst (British army) in Samsun warned Admiral Calthorpe one more time, but Hurst's units were replaced with a Brigade of Gurkhas. The movement of British units alarmed the population of the region and convinced the population that Mustafa Kemal was right. Right after this "The Association for Defense of National Rights" (Müdafaa-i Hukuk Cemiyeti) was founded in Trebizond (Trabzon), and a parallel association in Samsun was also founded, which declared that the Black Sea region was not safe. The same activities that happened during the Occupation of Smyrna were happening in the region. When the British landed in Alexandretta, Admiral Calthorpe resigned on the basis that this was against the Armistice that he had signed and was assigned to another position on 5 August 1919.

Kâzim Karabekir had called for a congress of all defense-of-rights associations to be held in Erzurum on 23 July 1919. Mustafa Kemal was elected head of the Erzurum Congress. This gave him the chance to talk in behalf of the national movement.

The Erzurum congress drafted a deceleration with the representatives of the six eastern provinces. Later known as the National Pact, it affirmed the inviolability of the Ottoman "frontiers"—that is, all the Ottoman lands inhabited by Turks when the Armistice of Mudros was signed. It declared the provisional government, which is named as Turkish Grand National Assembly (GNA). On the economic front, this document also followed the Ottoman position of rejection of special status arrangements for the minorities, which was named as the Capitulations of the Ottoman Empire. A steering committee was established and Mustafa Kemal as selected head.

Mustafa Kemal sought to extend the National Pact to the entire Ottoman-Muslim population of the empire. To that end, he called a national congress that met in Sivas and ratified the pact. He exposed attempts by the sultan’s government to arrest him and to disrupt the Sivas Congress.

== Resignation from Ottoman Army (8 July 1919) ==
The British were alarmed when they learned of Mustafa Kemal's activities and immediately contacted the Ottoman government. The grand vizier in Constantinople was driven from office, as he rejected the British view. A new government was established. Ottoman government issued a warrant for the arrest of Mustafa Kemal, on the charge that he was disobeying the Sultan's order for dissolving the remaining Ottoman forces in Anatolia, later condemning him to death. As a response, Mustafa Kemal resigned from the Ottoman Army on 8 July, while he was in Erzurum. Mustafa Kemal called for a national election to establish a new Turkish Parliament that would have its seat in Angora (Ankara). The call for an election became successful. On 12 February 1920, the last Ottoman Parliament gathered in Istanbul and declared the National Pact (Turkish: Misak-ı Milli). Following the Parliament was dissolved by the occupying British forces.

== War of Independence ==
The British, Italian, French and Greek forces began to occupy Anatolia. The occupation of Constantinople along with the occupation of Smyrna (İzmir) mobilized the establishment of the Turkish national movement and the Turkish War of Independence. As a reaction to the partitioning of the Ottoman Empire, the Turks waged the War of Independence, which eventually led to the establishment of the Republic of Turkey.

=== Conflicts, March 1920 – March 1922 ===
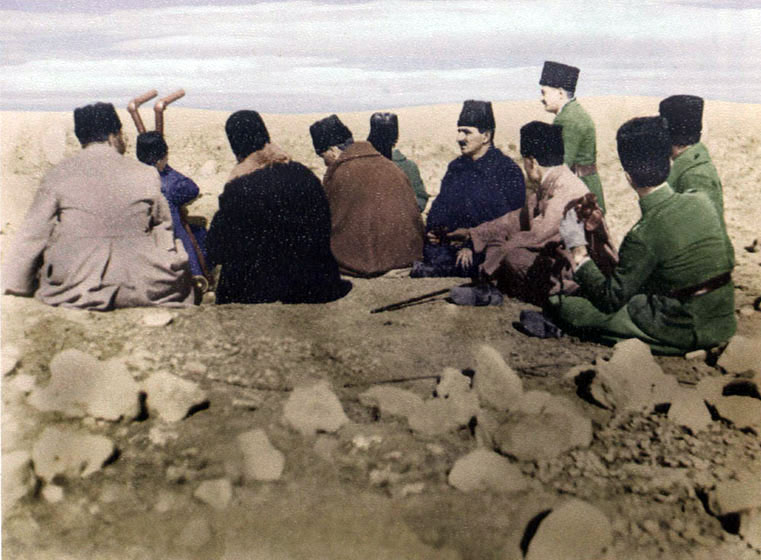
Battle of the Sakarya at Duatepe observation hill. Mustafa Kemal Atatürk with Fevzi Çakmak, Kazım Özalp, İsmet İnönü and Hayrullah Fişek, 10 September 1921

Mustafa Kemal used the dissolution of the Ottoman Parliament in Constantinople (Istanbul) as an opportunity to establish a new National Assembly in Angora (Ankara). The first session of the "Grand National Assembly of Turkey" (GNA) gathered on 23 April 1920, with Mustafa Kemal as its president. The assembly declared its goal as to "liberate the Sultan".

On 10 August 1920 Grand Vizier Damat Ferid Pasha signed the Treaty of Sèvres, which finalized the plans for the partitioning of Ottoman Empire including what Turkish nationals accepted as their heartland. Mustafa Kemal and his friends deemed the Treaty of Sèvres unacceptable, as it would spell the end of Turkish independence. The proposal for a British protectorate also rejected in the rest of Anatolia left to Turks by the Treaty of Sèvres. Kemal Insisted on complete independence and the safeguarding of the interests of the Turkish majority on Turkish soil. The acceptance of treaty and the following events weakened the legitimacy of the Sultan's government in Istanbul, and caused a shift of power in favour of the GNA in Ankara.

Mustafa Kemal persuaded the assembly to recognize that sovereignty resided in the nation and in the GNA as the representative of the nation. A popular sovereignty law was passed with the new constitution of 1921. This constitution gave Mustafa Kemal the tools to wage a War of Independence, as it publicly denounced the authority of the Istanbul government by assigning the right of sovereignty to the nation, not to the Ottoman Sultan. Kemal then persuaded the GNA to gather a National Army. The executive power was delegated to a cabinet and its speaker Mustafa Kemal. The National Army faced the Allied occupation forces and fought on three fronts: in the Franco-Turkish, Greco-Turkish and Turkish-Armenian wars.

In the early autumn of 1920, the Turkish-Armenian War was waged between the Turkish revolutionaries and the Armenian military. In December 1920, Armenia appealed for peace and signed the Treaty of Alexandropol. After Armenia was incorporated into the Transcaucasian SFSR as a Soviet Socialist Republic, the Treaty of Kars gave the Turks control over most of the territories in northeastern Anatolia, where they now constituted the ethnic majority.

==== Battle of the Sakarya ====
Mustafa Kemal with the Turkish revolutionaries.

After a series of initial battles during the Greco-Turkish War, the Greek army advanced as far as to the Sakarya River, just eighty kilometers west of the Grand National Assembly in Ankara. While events were being set into motion, Enver Pasha returned from Moscow to meet with several Union of Islamic Revolutionary Societies leaders in Batum about the possibility of taking over the leadership. Mustafa Kemal politely did not invite Enver to Angora, and he left Batum by the end of September, 1921. On 5 August 1921, Mustafa Kemal was promoted to be the Commander in chief of the forces. The Battle of the Sakarya from 23 August to 13 September 1921 ended with the defeat of the Greeks. Mustafa Kemal returned in triumph to Ankara, where a grateful Grand National Assembly awarded him the rank of Field Marshal of the Army, as well as the title of Gazi. Another meeting in Conference of London was held in March 1922. The Allies, without considering the extent of Ankara's successes, hoped to impose modified Serves as a peace settlement on Ankara. Allies offered to raise the Sèvres limits on the Turkish army to 85,000 men, eliminating the European financial controls over the Turkish government, but retaining the Capitulations and Public Debt Commission. Kemal rejected this proposal.

According to Nutuk that was delivered at the Grand National Assembly of Turkey in six days (15–20 October 1927) before the Second General Conference of the Republican People's Party, Mustafa Kemal Pasha may have issued the following order upon seeing that the Turkish army was losing ground rapidly, with little distance and virtually no natural defenses left between the battle line and the capital Ankara on 26 August 1921: "There is no line of defense, but a territory of defense and that territory is the whole of the motherland. No inch of the motherland may be abandoned without being soaked in the blood of her sons..."

==== Battle of Dumlupınar ====
After the failure of Conference of London, the final battle, Battle of Dumlupınar, was fought between August–September 1922. Mustafa Kemal chose to adopt the strategy of concentration and surprise, employed by General Allenby in Syria. He launched an all-out attack on the Greek lines at Afyonkarahisar, aimed at smashing a hole in the Greek defences, cutting the Greek supply lines and opening the road to Smyrna and to the sea. The Greek defense positions were overrun on 26 August. On 30 August, the Greek army was defeated decisively. On 1 September, Mustafa Kemal issued his famous order to the Turkish army: "Armies, your first goal is the Mediterranean, Forward!" The Greeks asked for an armistice on 6 September. By 10 September, the remainder of the Greek forces had left Anatolia, the Turkish mainland. Praising Mustafa Kemal's military capabilities, Noel Barber wrote, quoting H. C. Armstrong's Grey Wolf, Mustafa Kemal: An Intimate Study of a Dictator (1932):

A man born out of due season, an anachronism, a throwback to the Tartars of the steppes, a fierce elemental force of a man. With his military genius and his ruthless determination, … in a different age he might well have been a Genghis Khan, conquering empires…

— Noel Barber

== See also ==
- Timeline of Mustafa Kemal Atatürk
