= List of Ottoman battles in World War I =

This is a list of battles in World War I in which the Ottoman Empire fought. The Ottoman Empire fought on many fronts including the Eastern, Romanian and Macedonian fronts. Only battles in which the Ottoman Empire was one of the major belligerents are shown.

== The list ==
Date	Battle	Front
1914.11.02	Köprüköy (Bergmann Offensive)	Caucasus Campaign
1914.11.11	Basra	Mesopotamian Campaign
1914.12.22	Sarikamish	Caucasus Campaign
1915.01.18	Ardahan	Caucasus Campaign
1915.01.28	Suez Canal	Sinai and Palestine Campaign
1915.03.18	Naval operations	Gallipoli Campaign
1915.04.23	Katya	Sinai and Palestine Campaign
1915.04.25	Seddülbayır (Cape Helles)	Gallipoli Campaign
1915.04.25	Kumkale	Gallipoli Campaign
1915.04.25	1st Arıburnu (Anzac Cove)	Gallipoli Campaign
1915.04.28	1st Kirte	Gallipoli Campaign
1915.04.15	Battle of Dilman	Persian Campaign
1915.04.27	2nd Arıburnu (2nd Anzac Cove)	Gallipoli Campaign
1915.05.02	Baby 700	Gallipoli Campaign
1915.05.06	2nd Kirte	Gallipoli Campaign
1915.05.10	Action of 10 May 1915	Naval engagement in the Black Sea
1915.05.13	Sinking of Goliath	Gallipoli Campaign
1915.05.28	No.3 Post	Gallipoli Campaign
1915.05.29	3rd Arıburnu (3rd Anzac Cove)	Gallipoli Campaign
1915.06.04	3rd Kirte	Gallipoli Campaign
1915.06.28	Zığındere	Gallipoli Campaign
1915.07.10	Manzikert	Caucasus Campaign
1915.07.12	Salif	South Arabia during World War I
1915.07.21	Sheikh Othman	South Arabia during World War I
1915.07.27	Kara Killisse	Caucasus Campaign
1915.08.06	Kirte Bağları (Krithia Vineyard)	Gallipoli Campaign
1915.08.06	Kanlısırt (Lone Pine)	Gallipoli Campaign
1915.08.06	Anafartalar	Gallipoli Campaign
1915.08.07	Conkbayır	Gallipoli Campaign
1915.08.07	Sarıbayır	Gallipoli Campaign
1915.08.07	Kılıçbayır (The Nek)	Gallipoli Campaign
1915.08.21	Hill 60	Gallipoli Campaign
1915.08.21	Yusufçuktepe (Scimitar Hill)	Gallipoli Campaign
1915.11.05	Selman’ı Pak (Ctesiphon)	Mesopotamian Campaign
1915.12.07	1st Kut	Mesopotamian Campaign
1916.01.06	Sağ Sahil	Mesopotamian Campaign
1916.01.10	Erzurum Offensive	Caucasus Campaign
1916.01.13	Wadi	Mesopotamian Campaign
1916.01.21	Felahiye (Hanna)	Mesopotamian Campaign
1916.03.08	Sabis	Mesopotamian Campaign
1916.04.15	Trebizond	Caucasus Campaign
1916.04.15	Suez Canal	Sinai and Palestine Campaign
1916.06.04	Khanaqin	Mesopotamian Campaign
1916.06.10	Mecca	Arab revolt
1916.07.02	Erzincan	Caucasus Campaign
1916.07.06	Aqaba	Sinai and Palestine Campaign
1916.08.01	Bitlis	Caucasus Campaign
1916.08.03	Muş	Caucasus Campaign
1916.08.03	Romani	Sinai and Palestine Campaign
1916.08.09	Bir el Abd	Sinai and Palestine Campaign
1916.10.21	Amzacea	Dobruja campaign
1916.12.01	Yanbu	Arab revolt
1916.12.22	Râmnicu Sărat	The Romanian Debacle
1916.12.23	Magdhaba	Sinai and Palestine Campaign
1917.01.09	Rafa	Sinai and Palestine Campaign
1917.02.13	Nekhl	Sinai and Palestine Campaign
1917.02.23	Bir el Hassana	Sinai and Palestine Campaign
1917.02.23	2nd Kut	Mesopotamian Campaign
1917.02.25	Bughaila	Mesopotamian Campaign
1917.03.11	Samarrah	Mesopotamian Campaign
1917.03.19	Fallujah	Mesopotamian Campaign
1917.03.25	Jebel Hamlin	Mesopotamian Campaign
1917.03.26	1st Gaza	Sinai and Palestine Campaign
1917.03.19	Duqma	Mesopotamian Campaign
1917.04.17	2nd Gaza	Sinai and Palestine Campaign
1917.04.25	Istabulat	Mesopotamian Campaign
1917.05.05	Seray Mountain	Persian Campaign
1917.07.06	Aqaba	Arab revolt
1917.07.08	Ramadi	Mesopotamian Campaign
1917.10.23	Wadi Musa	Sinai and Palestine Campaign
1917.10.31	Beersheba	Sinai and Palestine Campaign
1917.11.01	Khuweilfe	Sinai and Palestine Campaign
1917.11.01	3rd Gaza	Sinai and Palestine Campaign
1917.11.03	Baghdad	Mesopotamian Campaign
1917.11.06	Hareira and Sheria	Sinai and Palestine Campaign
1917.11.07	Wadi el Hesi	Sinai and Palestine Campaign
1917.11.08	Huj	Sinai and Palestine Campaign
1917.11.13	Mughar Ridge	Sinai and Palestine Campaign
1917.11.14	Ayun Kara	Sinai and Palestine Campaign
1917.11.17	Jerusalem	Sinai and Palestine Campaign
1917.11.20	Jaffa	Sinai and Palestine Campaign
1918.01.20	Imbros	Mediterranean Theatre
1918.02.19	Jericho	Sinai and Palestine Campaign
1918.02.24	Trebizond	Caucasus Campaign
1918.02.98	Tell 'Asur	Sinai and Palestine Campaign
1918.03.09	Khan Baghdadi	Mesopotamian Campaign
1918.03.12	Erzurum	Caucasus Campaign
1918.03.21	Hijla	Sinai and Palestine Campaign
1918.03.27	1st Amman	Sinai and Palestine Campaign
1918.04.08	Ushno	Persian campaign
1918.04.19	Kars	Caucasus Campaign
1918.04.30	Berukin and 1st Arara	Sinai and Palestine Campaign
1918.04.30	2nd Transjordan	Sinai and Palestine Campaign
1918.05.21	Abaran	Caucasus Campaign
1918.05.21	Sardarabad	Caucasus Campaign
1918.05.25	Karakilisa	Caucasus Campaign
1918.06.06	Baku	Caucasus Campaign
1918.06.08	Arsuf	Sinai and Palestine Campaign
1918.06.08	German Expedition	Caucasus Campaign
1918.07.14	Abu Tellul	Sinai and Palestine Campaign
1918.08.01	Dagestan	Caucasus Campaign
1918.09 19	2nd Arara	Sinai and Palestine Campaign
1918.09.19	Megiddo	Sinai and Palestine Campaign
1918.09.19	Tabsor	Sinai and Palestine Campaign
1918.09.19	Tulkarm	Sinai and Palestine Campaign
1918.09.20	Afulah and Beisan	Sinai and Palestine Campaign
1918.09.20	Nazareth	Sinai and Palestine Campaign
1918.09.20	Jenin	Sinai and Palestine Campaign
1918.09.23	Haifa	Sinai and Palestine Campaign
1918.09.25	Samakh	Sinai and Palestine Campaign
1918.09.25	Tiberias	Sinai and Palestine Campaign
1918.09.26	Irbid	Sinai and Palestine Campaign
1918.09.27	Jisr Benat Yakub	Sinai and Palestine Campaign
1918.09.30	Kaukab	Sinai and Palestine Campaign
1918.10.01	Damascus	Sinai and Palestine Campaign
1918.10.02	Kiswe	Sinai and Palestine Campaign
1918.10.22	Jisr ed Damieh	Sinai and Palestine Campaign
1918.10.23	Sharqat	Mesopotamian Campaign
1918.10.25	Aleppo	Sinai and Palestine Campaign
1918.10.25	Khan Ayash	Sinai and Palestine Campaign
1918.10.25	2nd Amman	Sinai and Palestine Campaign
1918.10.26	Haritan	Sinai and Palestine Campaign

== See also ==
- List of battles involving the Ottoman Empire
- List of Ottoman battles in the 20th century
- List of battles of the Turkish War of Independence
