= List of Ottoman battles in the 20th century =

This is a list of 20th-century battles involving the Ottoman Empire prior to World War I; for World War I battles, see List of Ottoman battles in World War I.

== The table ==
Blue in the following table represents naval engagement.

Date	Battle	Opponent	War
28 September 1911	Preveza	Italy	Italo-Turkish War
28 November 1911	Kuwayfia	Italy	Italo-Turkish War
22 December 1911	Tobruk	Italy	Italo-Turkish War
7 January 1912	Kunfuda Bay	Italy	Italo-Turkish War
24 February 1912	Beirut	Italy	Italo-Turkish War
3 March 1912	Derna	Italy	Italo-Turkish War
4 May 1912	Rhodes	Italy	Italo-Turkish War
8 June 1912	Zanzur	Italy	Italo-Turkish War
20 September 1912	Zanzur	Italy	Italo-Turkish War
18–21 October 1912	Lemnos	Greece	First Balkan War
21 October 1912	Kırcalı (Kardzhali)	Bulgaria	First Balkan War
22 October 1912	Sarantaporo	Greece	First Balkan War
23 October 1912	Kumanovo	Serbia	First Balkan War
24 October 1912	Kirk Kilise	Bulgaria	First Balkan War
28 October 1912	İşkodra (Scutari)	Serbia and Montenegro	First Balkan War
28 October 1912	Lüleburgaz	Bulgaria	First Balkan War
2–3 November 1912	Yenidje	Greece	First Balkan War
2–6 November 1912	Sorovich	Greece	First Balkan War
3 November 1912	Edirne (Adrianople)	Bulgaria	First Balkan War
4 November 1912	First Çatalca	Bulgaria	First Balkan War
4–11 November 1912	Beşpınar (Pente Pigadia)	Greece	First Balkan War
3 November 1912	Prilep	Serbia	First Balkan War
14 November 1912	Merhamli	Bulgaria	First Balkan War
16 November 1912	İmroz (Elli)	Greece	First Balkan War
16 November 1912	Monastir	Serbia	First Balkan War
18 November 1912	Himara	Greece	First Balkan War
21 November 1912	Varna (Kaliakra)	Bulgaria	First Balkan War
21 November – 21 December 1912	Lesbos	Greece	First Balkan War
24 November 1912 – 3 January 1913	Chios	Greece	First Balkan War
20 December 1912	Korytsa	Greece	First Balkan War
18 January 1913	Lemnos	Greece	First Balkan War
26 January 1913	Bolayır	Bulgaria	First Balkan War
9 February 1913	Şarköy	Bulgaria	First Balkan War
4 March 1913	Bizani	Greece	First Balkan War
3 March 1913	Second Çatalca	Bulgaria	First Balkan War
21 July 1913	Siege of Adrianople	Bulgaria	Second Balkan War

== See also ==
- List of battles involving the Ottoman Empire
- List of Ottoman battles in World War I
- List of battles of the Turkish War of Independence
