= Giuseppe Pavone =

Giuseppe Pavone may refer to:

- Giuseppe Pavone (footballer)
- Giuseppe Pavone (general)
