= Giuseppe Pavone (general) =

- Born: 27 October 1876; Potenza, Kingdom of Italy
- Died: 1944 (age 68); Torchiara, Kingdom of Italy
- Military career
- Allegiance: Kingdom of Italy
- Branch: Royal Italian Army
- Service years: 1894–1943
- Rank: Lieutenant General
- Commands: 18th Infantry Regiment "Acqui"; 64th Infantry Regiment "Cagliari"; 30th Infantry Regiment "Pisa"; 3rd Infantry Brigade; 29th Infantry Division "Peloritana" "Italia" Combat Groups
- Conflicts: Italo-Turkish War; Battle of Derna; Battle of Misrata; World War I; Battles of the Isonzo; First Battle of the Piave; Second Battle of Piave; Second Italo-Ethiopian War; Battle of Genale Doria; World War II
- Awards: Silver Medal of Military Valor (twice); Bronze Medal of Military Valor (three times); Order of Saints Maurice and Lazarus

Giuseppe Pavone (27 October 1876 – 1944) was an Italian general during the interwar period and World War II.

== Biography ==
He was born in Potenza on 27 October 1876, and at age eighteen he volunteered for the Royal Italian Army, attending the Military Academy of Modena and graduating as second lieutenant in 1896. He was promoted to lieutenant in 1900, and to captain in 1911; following the outbreak of the Italian-Turkish war he left for Libya, where in command of a company of the 35th Infantry Regiment "Pistoia", he participated in the battles of Derna and Misrata. After the Kingdom of Italy entered the First World War on 24 May 1915, he fought on the Italian front, initially commanding an infantry battalion and later the Arditi units of the Third Army, being promoted to major in 1916, lieutenant colonel in August 1917 and colonel for war merit in November of the same year. For his conduct during the fighting on Podgora, a hill near Gorizia (where he was wounded), during the First and Third Battle of the Isonzo he was awarded two Bronze Medals of Military Valor. He later earned a Silver Medal of Military Valor during the Tenth Battle of the Isonzo and another one during the First Battle of the Piave, and a third bronze medal for an action on the Montello during the Second Battle of the Piave.

After the war he was civil commissioner of Volosko, where he did not interfere with Gabriele D'Annunzio's occupation of Fiume, becoming friends with the poet, although he did not directly participate in his enterprise. He later became commander of the 18th Infantry Regiment "Acqui" from May 1924 to February 1926, of the 64th Infantry Regiment "Cagliari" from February to November 1926, and of the 30th Infantry Regiment "Pisa" from November 1926 to 16 January 1930. After promotion to the rank of Brigadier General on 16 January 1930, he became Mobilization Inspector of the territorial division of Livorno, and then commanded the 3rd Infantry Brigade in Alessandria. He was then promoted to major general on 22 July 1933 and given command of the "Piave" territorial military division of Padua. In February 1935 he assumed command of the 29th Infantry Division "Peloritana", at the head of which he left for the war in Ethiopia. The division was deployed on the Somali front, as part of the forces under General Rodolfo Graziani, distinguishing itself in the battle of Genale Doria. In February 1936 Pavone was repatriated, owing to disagreements with Graziani and his growing dissent towards the Fascist regime, and was placed on sick leave for two years, effectively ending his active career. On 27 January 1938 he was assigned to the Army Corps of Naples for special duties till 31 July 1940, when he was transferred to the Army reserve, being promoted to Lieutenant General on 20 November of the same year.

After the Armistice of Cassibile Pavone, who lived in his estate in Torchiara, welcomed the Allied troops who had landed a few miles from his villa in Operation Avalanche; he joined the Action Party and was one of the supporters, together with Benedetto Croce, of the establishment of the "Italia" Combat Groups, volunteer units that would fight alongside the Allied troops in the liberation of the Italian peninsula. Together with Action Party members Pasquale Schiano, Raimondo Craveri and Alberto Tarchiani, on 24 September 1943 Pavone had a meeting with General William J. Donovan of the Office of Strategic Services at the headquarters of the US 5th Army in Paestum, which resulted in them obtaining the authorization to create the combat groups. The first of a thousand volunteers started to enlist from 10 October, training in the countryside under the command of Pavone; however, both king Victor Emmanuel III and the head of the "southern" government, Pietro Badoglio, refused to accept the establishment of Italian units outside their control, and pressured the British into ordering the disbandment of the combat groups on 1 November 1943. Pavone then retired to live in Torchiara, where he died a few months later.
