= List of battles of the Turkish War of Independence =

This is a list of battles of the Turkish War of Independence. The list does not include battles fought against the rebels and the Ottoman government (for these, see Revolts during the Turkish War of Independence).

| Date | Battle | Opponent | Result | Turkish military casualties | Opponent military casualties |
|---|---|---|---|---|---|
| 15 May 1919 | Greek landing at Smyrna | Greece | Greek victory | 30–40 killed, 40–60 wounded | 2 killed, 6–20 wounded |
| 16 May 1919 | Urla | Greece | Greek victory | Unknown | Unknown |
| 16 June 1919 | Malgaç | Greece | Turkish victory | 1 wounded | 20+ killed |
| 15 June 1919 | Bergama | Greece | Greek victory | 10 dead, 9 wounded, 86 missing | Unknown |
| 20 June 1919 | Erbeyli | Greece | Greek victory | 30–80 killed, 40 wounded | 7 killed, 12 wounded |
| 21 June 1919 | Erikli | Greece | Turkish victory | 30 killed, 40 wounded | 7 killed, 10 wounded |
| 25 June 1919 | Tellidede | Greece | Greek victory | 30+ killed and wounded | 6 killed and a few wounded |
| 27 June 1919 | Aydın | Greece | Greek victory | Both sides=1,500 to 2,000 | |
| 21 January 1920 | Marash | France | Turkish victory | 4,500 killed, 500+ wounded (including civilians) | 160 killed, 280 wounded, 170 missing |
| 8 February 1920 | Urfa | France | Turkish victory | ~1,000 killed, captured, wounded and missing | ~460 killed or captured |
| 1 April 1920 | Aintab | France | French victory | 6,317 killed (mostly civilians), +2000 prisoners | 1200 killed |
| 27 May 1920 | Karboğazı | France | Turkish victory | None | 150+ killed, 673 prisoners |
| 18 June 1920 | Oltu | Armenia | Turkish victory | Unknown | Unknown |
| June-September 1920 | Greek Summer Offensive | Greece-Britain | Greek and British victory | Unknown | Unknown |
| 29 September 1920 | Sarıkamış | Armenia | Turkish victory | Unknown | Unknown |
| 11 October 1920 | Kovanbaşı | France | Turkish victory | Unknown | ~1000 killed, wounded and captured |
| 27 October 1920 | Gediz | Greece | Greek victory | 181 killed, 135 wounded | 42 killed, 123 wounded |
| 30 October 1920 | Kars | Armenia | Turkish victory | +150 killed, +3,000 prisoners | 9 killed, 47 wounded |
| 1 November 1920 | Kanlıgeçit | France | Turkish victory | Unknown | 1050 killed |
| 7 November 1920 | Alexandropol | Armenia | Turkish victory | Unknown | Unknown |
| 20 November 1920 | Fadıl | France | Turkish victory | 25 killed, 40 wounded | 500+ killed |
| 9 January 1921 | 1st İnönü | Greece | Turkish victory | 95 killed, 183 wounded, 211 prisoners | 51 killed, 130 wounded |
| 26 March 1921 | 2nd İnönü | Greece | Turkish victory | 681 killed, 1822 wounded,1369 missing and prisoner, 3 executed | 707 killed, 3075 wounded, 503 missing |
| 8–15 April 1921 | Aslıhanlar–Dumlupınar | Greece | Greek victory | 400 killed, 800 wounded, 4,000 deserters | 47 killed, 544 wounded |
| 10 July 1921 | Eskişehir | Greece | Greek victory | 1643 killed, 4981 wounded, 374 prisoners, 30,809 deserted | 1491 killed, 6472 wounded, 110 missing |
| 23 August 1921 | Sakarya | Greece | Turkish victory | 3,700 killed, 18,480 wounded, 108 prisoners, 5,639 deserted, 8,089 missing | 4,000 dead, 19,000 wounded, 354 missing |
| 7 June 1922 | Samsun | Greece | Inconclusive | None | None |
| 26 August-18 September 1922 | Great Offensive | Greece | Turkish victory | 2,318 killed, 9,360 wounded, 1,697 missing, 101 prisoners | 35,000 killed and wounded, 15,000 prisoners |
| 30 August 1922 | Dumlupınar | Greece | Turkish victory | 2,318 killed, 9,360 wounded, 1,697 missing, 101 prisoners | 8,000 killed, 2,000 wounded, 2,000 captured, |
| 9 September 1922 | Turkish capture of Smyrna | Greece | Turkish victory | Unknown | Unknown |

== See also ==
- Chanak Crisis
- List of battles involving the Ottoman Empire
- List of Ottoman battles in the 20th century
- List of Ottoman battles in World War I
