= Faik Pasha =

Ottoman Army general (1876–1916)

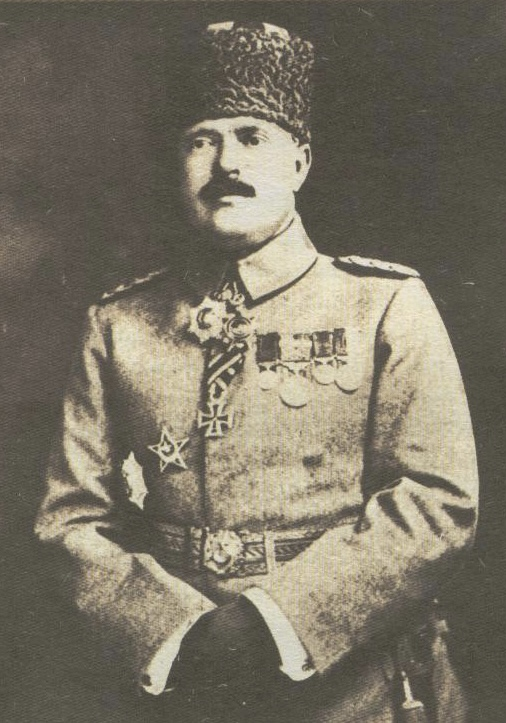
- Faik Pasha
- Born: 1876; Köprülü, Ottoman Empire
- Died: 30 August 1916 (aged 39–40); Bitlis, Ottoman Empire
- Military career
- Allegiance: Ottoman Empire
- Branch: Ottoman Army
- Service years: 1900 – 30 August 1916
- Rank: Major general
- Nickname: "Çolak" Faik
- Commands: 19th Division, II Corps
- Conflicts: Balkan Wars; World War I: Battle of Muş †

Faik Pasha (1876 – 30 August 1916), also known as Ahmed Faik, Süleyman Faik or by his nickname Çolak Faik, was a general of the Ottoman Army, and the grandmaster of Freemasonry in the Ottoman Empire.

== Military career ==
After graduating from Kuleli Military High School, Faik entered the Ottoman Imperial School of Military Engineering (Mühendishane-i Berrî-i Hümâyûn). He subsequently graduated from the Ottoman Military College as a staff captain on 17 January 1900, after which he was appointed to the island of Sisam (now known as Samos). In 1909, when he was a lieutenant colonel (Kaymakam), he was assigned to Debre Mustarrıflığı.

=== Balkan Wars ===
He served during the Balkan Wars as Chief of Staff of the VII Corps of the Western Army. The commander was Mirliva Fethi Pasha, who was killed in action while trying to stop the withdrawal of Ottoman soldiers from Koçişte Hill near Monastir in 1912. Faik Bey was promoted to the rank of lieutenant colonel for his efforts during the battle. He was one of the few successful Ottoman officers of the army during that war. Faik Bey was made commander of 19th Infantry Division. In 1912, the division fought the Greeks in Yanya (now known as Ioannina). Faik Bey became pasha and the commander of the Independent Cavalry Division.

=== Gallipoli campaign ===
At the beginning of the Gallipoli campaign, Faik was commander of II Corps. With two divisions, the corps came under the command of Liman von Sanders's Fifth Army. Lieutenant General Weber Pasha wanted Faik Pasha to command the "Right Wing". But Liman von Sanders disliked him and he had a quarrel with Faik Pasha about tactics. Weber Pasha insisted on his decision. At last, unwillingly, von Sanders appointed Faik Pasha to the command of Right Wing.

He fought during the Battle of Gully Ravine (28 June – 3 July 1915), which was a very bloody battle that resulted in a large number of Ottoman casualties. The casualties of the 3rd Battalion, 70th Regiment, on 2 July 1915, amounted to six officers killed, four wounded and 158 personnel killed. In addition, a further 285 were wounded.

=== Caucasus campaign ===
In 1916, Faik commanded the Ottoman II Corps during the Caucasus campaign. He was shot and killed following the defeat of the Turkish forces during fighting around the Çavreşi mountains on 30 August 1916.

== Freemasonry ==
During his stay in the Balkans, he was initiated as a freemason in Resne (Resen). After the resignment of Grand Master Most Worshipful Talaat Pasha, Faik was elected as Grand Master on 18 October 1912. Most Worshipfull Grand Master Faik Pasha reigned until 14 April 1913.

== Bibliography ==
- İsmail Tosun Saral, Büyük Üstad Şehid Faik Paşa ("Grand Master Faik Pasha the Martyr")
