= Battle of Bitlis =

1915–16 battles in the Caucasus Campaign

Battle of Bitlis Битлисское сражение Բաղեշի ճակատամարտ Bitlis Muharebesi
- Part of Caucasus campaign
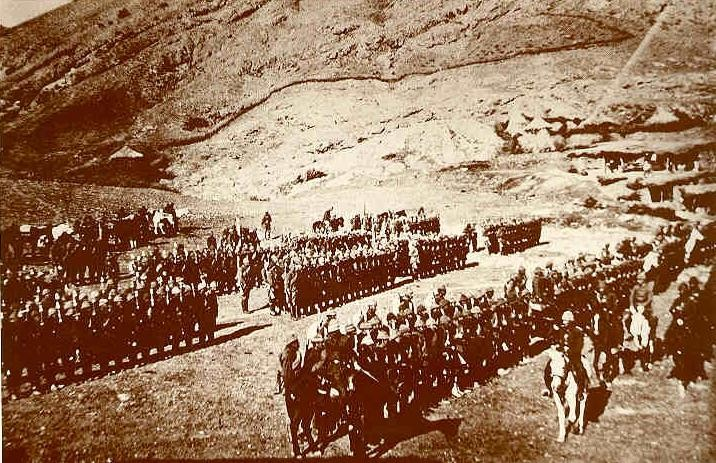
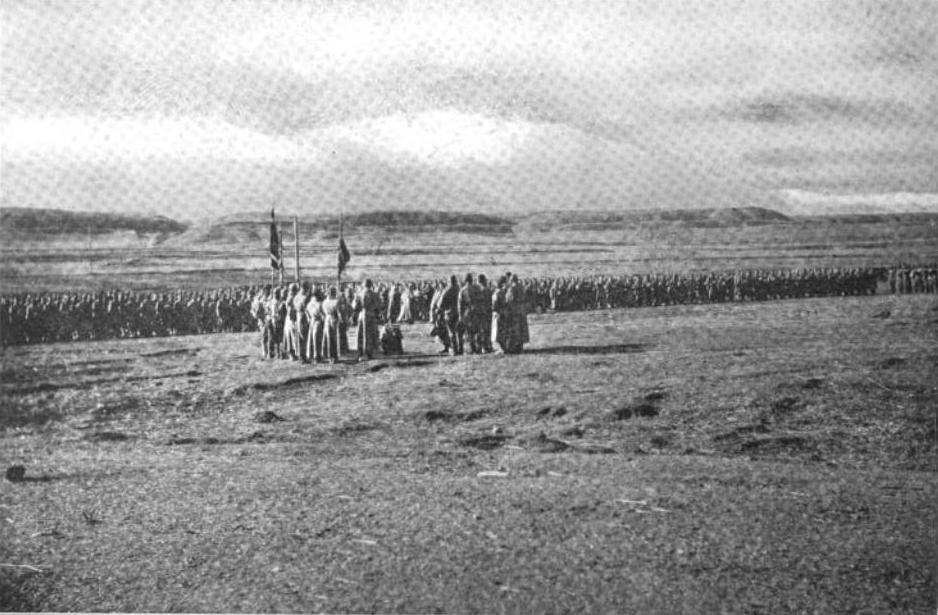
Date	July 1915 – August 1916
Location	Bitlis Vilayet, Ottoman Empire
Result	Russian victory

Belligerents
Russian Empire: Armenian volunteer units	Ottoman Empire

Commanders and leaders
Nikolai Yudenich; Andranik Ozanian	Mustafa Kemal Pasha; Ahmed Izzet Pasha (Note: Army commander)

Strength
Russian Caucasus Army; Armenian Fedayi	Second Army; Kurdish Tribesmen

Casualties and losses
Unknown	34,000 captured or killed

The Battle of Bitlis refers to a series of engagements in the summer of 1916 for the town of Bitlis and to a lesser extent nearby Muş, between Russian Imperial forces and their Ottoman counterparts. The town was the last stronghold of the Ottoman Empire preventing the Russians from entering Anatolia and Mesopotamia. Part of the battle is known as Battle of Muş

The first military confrontation at Bitlis occurred in July 1915, when Russian troops launched an unsuccessful assault on the town's fortifications. The second confrontation began in February 1916 and ended with the capture of Bitlis by new Russian corps, which largely consisted of the 1st Battalion of the Armenian volunteer units under the command of Andranik Ozanian. The Allied withdrawal from Gallipoli gave opportunity for Turkish forces to redeploy to the Caucasus region. Russian commander Nikolai Yudenich intended to attack the Turks before they could organize their forces to launch an attack. After a series of clashes in Koprukoy, Erzurum, Muş, the Russian IV Caucasian Corps captured Bitlis on 2–3 March, 1,000 more prisoners were taken in the city.

The Ottoman troops of Ahmed Izzet Pasha were composed of veterans from the Gallipoli campaign. They were to outflank the Russians in Bitlis before the end of March, but communications were terrible, and troops had to march from Ankara for a month. The Turkish Second Army's (belated) offensive began on 2 August 1916 and successfully took back Bitlis (and Muş) but lost other territories in the Euphrates region to the Russians. On 24 August, the Russian forces had recaptured both Mush and Bitlis. The Ottomans suffered 34,000 casualties, around half of which were POWs.

== See also ==
- Battle of Muş
- Battle of Çapakçur

== Sources ==
- The Berlin-Baghdad Express: the Ottoman Empire and Germany's bid for world power, Sean McMeekin, page 243
- Jaques, Tony (2006). Dictionary of Battles. Vol. 1, A–E. Greenwood Press. "While Russian General Nikolai Yudenich seized Erzincan, Ahmet Izzet Pasha's Second Army advanced against the Russian left flank, where his corps cammder Mustafa Kemal seized Bitlis and Mus. Yudenich counter-attacked and, after prolonged combat west of Lake Van, he retook Bitlis and the Turks abandoned Mus before winter ended the fighting."
- Öz Akçora, Kaya, Ergün, Mehmet (May 14, 2022). The Place and Importance of Bingöl and Bitlis in the First World War.
