= List of awards and honours received by Mustafa Kemal Atatürk =

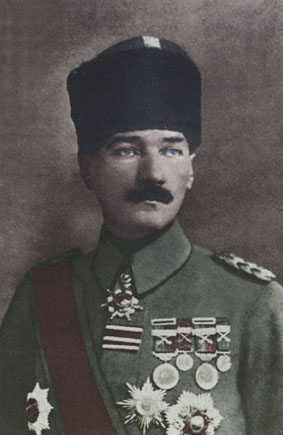
Portrait taken in 1918 with his awards

This is a comprehensive list of honours and awards of Mustafa Kemal Atatürk (c. 1881 – 10 November 1938) who was a field marshal, revolutionary statesman, and founder of the Republic of Turkey as well as its first President.

== Orders, decorations and medals ==
Name	Decorator	Reason	Metal	Date
Medjidie Order, 5th class	Abdul Hamid II	Distinguished service as a staff captain in Damascus	Silver	25 December 1906
Osmanieh Order, 4th class	Mehmed V	Achievements during the Battle of Benghazi he participated voluntarily	Silver	6 November 1912
Légion d'honneur	France	Achievements as Yarbay (Lieutenant Colonel) at the Operations Command of the Mediterranean Regular Forces		11 March 1914
Osmanieh Order, 3rd class	Mehmed V	Achievements during the building of the 19th Division in Tekirdağ he commanded voluntarily	Silver	1 February 1915
Order of Saint Alexander (3rd Class/Commander)	King Ferdinand of Bulgaria	Achievements during the Battle of Gallipoli		23 March 1915
Imtiyaz Medal in Silver	Mehmed V	Achievements during command of the 19th Division of 5th Army	Silver	30 April 1915
Liakat Medal (Medal of Merit)	Mehmed V	Achievements during the Battle of Gallipoli	Silver	1 September 1915
Iron Cross	William II	Achievements during the Battle of Gallipoli	Iron	28 December 1915
Liakat Medal (Medal of Merit)	Mehmed V	Achievements during the Battle of Sari Bair	Gold	17 January 1916
Osmanieh Order, 2nd class	Mehmed V	Achievements during the Caucasus Campaign	Silver	1 February 1916
Military Merit Medal	Austria-Hungary	Achievements during World War I		27 July 1916
Military Merit Cross, 3rd class	Austria-Hungary	Achievements during World War I		27 July 1916
Medjidie Order, 2nd class	Mehmed V	Achievements during command of the XVI Corps of the 2nd Army at the Caucasus Campaign	Gold Centre	12 December 1916
Iron Cross, 2nd Class	German Empire	Achievements during World War I	Iron	9 September 1917
Iron Cross, 1st Class	German Empire	Achievements during World War I	Iron	9 September 1917
Military Merit Medal, 2nd class	Austria-Hungary	Achievements during World War I		9 September 1917
Imtiyaz Medal in Gold	Mehmed V	Achievements during the Caucasus Campaign	Gold	23 September 1917
Medjidie Order, 1st class	Mehmed V	Achievements during World War I	Gold Centre	16 December 1917
Order of the Crown of Prussia, 1st class	William II, German Emperor King of Prussia	Achievements during World War I		19 February 1918
War Medal	Mehmed VI	World War I veteran	Silver	11 May 1918
Aliyülala Order	Amanullah Shah, King of Afghanistan		Gold Centre	27 March 1923
Turkish Medal of Independence	Turkish Grand National Assembly (TBMM)	Accomplishments during the War of Independence	Bronze	21 November 1923
Murassa Order	Turkish Aeronautical Association	Establishment of TAA	Platinum	20 May 1925
Sadakat Silver Hizmet Salibi			Silver	12 November 1931

== Ribbons, Lapel pins ==
Name	Date
Remembrance of Monument of Victory	1927
4th Congress of the Allied Agencies	1929
Remembrance on the occasion of the visit of Shah of Iran to Turkey	1934
First Army	20 August 1937
Second Army	13 October 1937
City of Ankara Lapel pin	27 December 1937
TBMM Lapel pin	
