= Raid on Salif =

Military battle during the South Arabia campaign of World War I

- Part of South Arabian campaign of World War I
Date	12–14 June 1917
Location	Port of Salif, Ottoman Empire (modern-day Yemen) 15.2833°N 42.6833°E
Result	British victory

Belligerents
(United Kingdom) British Empire	Ottoman Empire

Commanders and leaders
(United Kingdom) William Boyle	Unknown

Units involved
Royal Navy; Royal Marines	(Ottoman Empire) 57th Infantry (Ottoman Empire) 23rd Artillery

Strength
~250 men 5 Ships	Around 100 men

Casualties and losses
1 killed 1 wounded	
- Location within Yemen

The Raid on Salif (Note: Turkish: İngilizlerin Salif'e düzenlediği baskın) was a amphibious operation during the South Arabian campaign of World War I, in which British naval and marine forces seized the Red Sea port of Salif from the Ottoman Empire.

== Background ==
The remote and mountainous country of Yemen was in 1917 theoretically part of the Turkish Empire, however during preceding years the Imam of Yemen had loosened Turkish ties so that only in the capital Sanaa, and in Red Sea coastal ports such as Hodeida, and along the Aden border was Turkish military authority paramount. The Turks in Yemen were confronting British troops across the border on Aden territory with what resources they possessed, but basically Yemen was a backwater. Lawrence of Arabia’s line-cutting exploits on the Hedjaz Railway ensured that reinforcements and military weapons and ammunition resupplies did not get through.

The Royal Navy maintained a blockade of Red Sea ports to prevent arms traffic, but this was not fully effective as British political considerations allowed ‘friendly’ nations to trade across the Red Sea without too much interference. Since 1915 the largest Yemeni island in the Red Sea, Kamaran, had been garrisoned by Indian Army troops based in Aden; this island was a quarantine station for pilgrims travelling to Mecca and there were some large and useful structures on it.

Opposite Kamaran was the small Yemeni town and port of Salif, garrisoned by around 100 Turkish troops with a few artillery pieces. Before the war the Turks had exported local rock-salt deposits from Salif, and a British company had been contracted to upgrade the port facilities. This company, Messrs Sir John Jackson Limited, had evacuated Salif quickly when hostilities were declared between Turkey and Britain, leaving some valuable heavy plant and equipment behind.

The Royal Navy Commander-in-Chief, East Indies, wished to remove or destroy this plant to prevent the Turks from putting it to military use. He requested the loan of a company of Indian troops to assist the Royal Navy in this task, but the Government of India dissented and refused to agree to the use of the troops; perhaps the feeling at that time in Delhi was that India could not afford to be sucked-in to garrisoning any more foreign locations.

== The Assault ==
At dawn on 12 June. Captain Boyle approached Salif with four ships in line; Northbrook close inshore to the south, then Minto, Topaze and Odin to the north. Espiegle was ordered to sail north around the Salif peninsula and operate from the bay there. Northbrook’s men landed on the shore and took up a position to the right of the town. The men from Minto, Topaze and Odin landed at Salif pier and formed a line behind a ridge with a salt mine on the south and houses to the north. The Royal Marines were in the centre of the line. Commander A.R. Woods DSO, Royal Navy, of the Topaze commanded the landing party with Commander J.S.C. Salmond, Royal Navy, as his second in command; there was no Royal Marines officer present. Signalling parties established communications with the ships.

The British attacked the next day at dawn. On sighting the naval squadron the Turkish defenders withdrew into a crater-like depression on the hill behind the town. Here they were out of line-of sight of the naval gunners, however in the depression their two Krupp mountain guns and three 1-inch Nordenfeldt guns could not engage the squadron or the landing party effectively because the forward lip of the depression needed to be cleared by their shells. This resulted in the Turkish guns being fired at too long a range. Near-misses were recorded by the squadron but no ship was hit.

Commander Woods moved his line forward to attack the enemy-held hill from three sides, the fourth side being closed by the guns of the Espiegle. Behind him Odin’s seamen entered the village and took possession of the telegraph office and water condensation plant. The shore-to-ship signals worked well and the assault party advanced methodically behind barrages of naval shells, despite the naval gunners having the sun in their eyes. On Commander Wood’s signal the hill was rushed and the Turks surrounded. Skirmishing now cleared up the pockets of resistance and prisoners were taken; three hours after the landing enemy resistance ceased. By 8.30 the Turkish position had been outflanked on both sides and their outlying detachments captured. Fifteen minutes later the garrison surrendered.

== Aftermath ==
British casualties were one man wounded and recovered but another man, a Royal Marine private, died of wounds. The only British man killed was Private Charles Read, and Conrad Cato’s book The Navy Everywhere gives a detailed review of the action and describes what happened to him:

“On the other side we must place the death of Private Read of H.M.S. Odin, who had the misfortune to jump almost on top of a Turk, and to receive a rifle-bullet at point-blank range. It would seem that the Turk fired by accident rather than intent, for all his messmates were on the point of holding up their hands, realising that they were completely surrounded.”

On the Turkish side, two military officers, nine civilians and 80 soldiers of the 57th Infantry and 23rd Artillery and 30 Arabs were taken prisoner. Two Krupp mountain guns, three 1 inch four-barrelled Nordenfeldts, ammunition and stores were captured.

With hostilities ended the squadron, minus Espiegle, sailed away to fresh duties. Espiegle loaded the plant and enemy weapons that were still serviceable and destroyed the remainder; a company of Indian troops did now come from Kamaran to garrison Salif, but only temporarily. The prisoners and the ladies and children found in a couple of Turkish military recreational establishments in the town were transported to Aden.

Plant belonging to Sir John Jackson & Co., employed before the War in improving Salif harbour, was found to be "unserviceable through deterioration", but all useful parts of the condenser were removed to Aden. The British force left Salif at sunset on 14 June.

Salif was occupied by a platoon from Kamaran in April 1919 to protect the pier, property of Sir John Jackson & Co., and installations of the O.P.D. The Foreign Office was "very anxious" that no one should work the salt works pending the settlement of former Turkish Arabia. In November 1921 an inventory was made of all foreign owned property at Salif prior to the handing over of Salif to the Idrissi on 14 November 1921 the day of the British evacuation.

== Sources ==
- Baldry, J. (1978). "British Naval Operations against Turkish Yaman, 1914–1919". Arabica. 25 (2): 148–197.
