= Battle of Sari Bair =

1915 battle in the Middle Eastern Theatre of World War I

Coordinates: 40°14′46″N 26°16′40″E

- Part of the Gallipoli campaign in the Middle Eastern Theatre of the First World War
Date	6–21 August 1915
Location	Gallipoli peninsula, Ottoman Empire
Result	Ottoman victory

Belligerents
British Empire: Australia; India; New Zealand; United Kingdom	Ottoman Empire: German Empire (Military commanders)

Commanders and leaders
(British Empire) Ian Hamilton	(Ottoman Empire) Mustafa Kemal (German Empire) Liman von Sanders (Ottoman Empire) Faik Pasha

Strength
4 divisions (initial)	Unknown

Casualties and losses
Unknown	Unknown

The Battle of Sari Bair (Turkish: Sarı Bayır Harekâtı), also known as the August Offensive (Ağustos Taarruzları), represented the final attempt made by the British in August 1915 to seize control of the Gallipoli peninsula from the Ottoman Empire during the First World War.

At the time of the battle, the Gallipoli Campaign had raged on two fronts – Anzac and Helles – for three months since the Allied land invasion of 25 April 1915. With the Anzac front locked in a tense stalemate, the Allies had attempted to carry the offensive on the Helles battlefield – at enormous cost and for little gain. In August, the British command proposed a new operation to reinvigorate the campaign by capturing the Sari Bair ridge, the high ground that dominated the middle of the Gallipoli peninsula above the Anzac landing.

The main operation started on 6 August with a fresh landing 5 miles (8.0 km) north of Anzac at Suvla Bay in conjunction with the Australian and New Zealand Army Corps. The Allies mounted an attack north into the rugged country alongside the Sari Bair range with the aim of capturing the high ground and linking with the Suvla landing. At Helles, the British and French were now to remain largely on the defensive.

== Background ==
The battle took place primarily around the ridge of Kocaçimentepe" meaning "Great Grass Hill" in Turkish. The peak was known to the British as "Hill 971" and they mistakenly applied the name for a lesser ridge to the main range, Sarı Bayır, meaning "Yellow Slope", which ended at the imposing bluff above Anzac Cove known as "The Sphinx".

== Prelude ==
The commander of the Mediterranean Expeditionary Force, General Sir Ian Hamilton, was provided with three British New Army divisions for the planned offensive; the 10th (Irish) Division, the 11th (Northern) Division and the 13th (Western) Division — all previously untried in battle. He was later reinforced with two Territorial Army divisions; the 53rd (Welsh) Division and the 54th (East Anglian) Division and one division of dismounted yeomanry; the 2nd Mounted Division.

The Suvla landing was to be made by the British IX Corps, under the command of Lieutenant-General Sir Frederick Stopford who had retired in 1909 and had never commanded men in battle. His appointment was made based solely on seniority but his hesitancy during the preparations for the landing should have warned Hamilton that he was not a fit choice for the command.

The Ottomans were well aware that a renewal of the offensive was imminent. There had been some doubt about whether the British would abandon the campaign but this was dispelled when Winston Churchill made a careless speech in Dundee, stating that the battle would continue, whatever the sacrifices. Consequently, the Fifth Army underwent a reorganisation resulting in an expansion to 16 divisions. Ten of these defended the existing battlefields (six at Helles, which had seen the bulk of the early fighting, and four at Anzac). Three divisions defended the Asian shore of the Dardanelles and three divisions of the Ottoman XVI Corps defended the Gulf of Saros north of Bulair at the neck of the peninsula.

The Ottomans anticipated that the offensive would involve a breakout from Anzac but were unsure whether it would be north (towards Suvla) or south (towards Gaba Tepe). A new British landing was also considered likely but Suvla was not rated highly as a candidate, consequently, only a modest force of four battalions defended the area. The Ottoman commanders also dismissed the possibility of an assault against the Sari Bair range due to the rugged terrain. Only Mustafa Kemal, commander of the Ottoman 19th Division at Anzac, expected the attack against the heights but he was unable to convince his commanding officer, Esad Pasha to significantly strengthen the defenses there. Back in June he had made another attempt, through Captain Fahrettin Altay, then 3rd Army chief of staff, to persuade Esad Pasha to improve the defenses further north, but achieved no result other than raising the ire of his commanding officer. To placate him, only one regiment, the 14th was moved to the sector north of Anzac.

== Battle ==
=== Anzac breakout ===
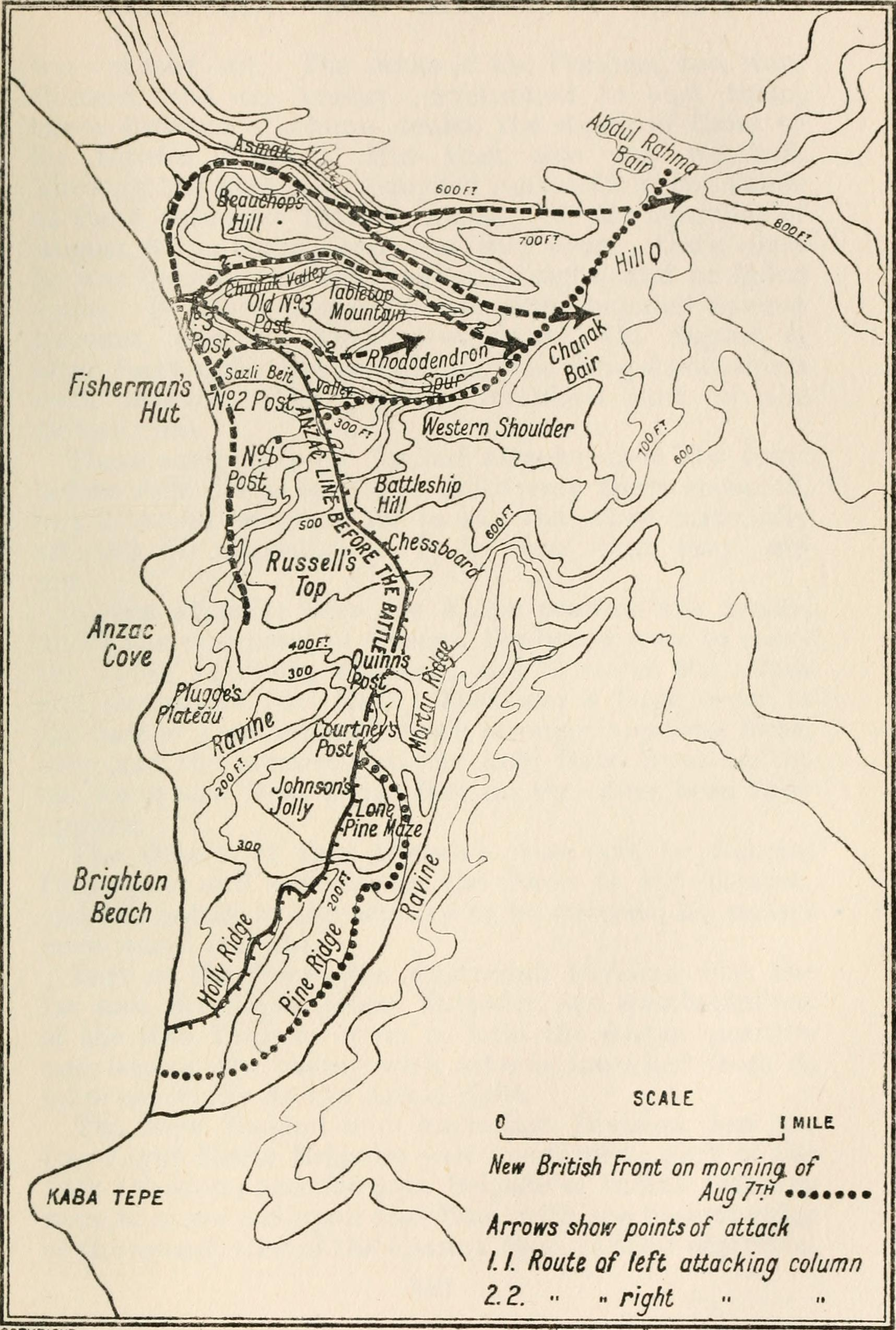
Map of the British attack, 6–8 August

The attack from the Anzac perimeter was directed against two peaks of the Sari Bair range; Chunuk Bair and Hill 971. Under the overall command of Major-General Alexander Godley, the attacking force included the New Zealand and Australian Division, the British 13th Division plus a couple of extra infantry brigades.

The plan was for two assaulting columns to march out of Anzac on the night of 6 August. The right-hand column, comprising the New Zealand Infantry Brigade under Brigadier-General Francis Johnston, would head for Chunuk Bair. The left-hand column, commanded by Major-General Herbert Cox, heading for Hill 971 and neighbouring Hill Q, contained the Australian 4th Infantry Brigade of Brigadier-General John Monash and Cox's 29th Indian Brigade. Both objectives were expected to be captured by dawn.

To distract the Ottomans from the impending offensive, on 6 August, at 5.30 p.m., an attack was made at Lone Pine by the infantry brigades of the Australian 1st Division. While the attack was ultimately successful in capturing the Ottoman trenches, it was counterproductive as a diversion as it attracted reinforcements to the north. Another costly diversion was carried out at Helles which resulted in a pointless struggle over a patch of ground known as Krithia Vineyard. As was the case at Lone Pine, the British action at Helles did not restrain the Ottomans from sending reinforcements north to the Sari Bair range.

The right column heading for Chunuk Bair had a simpler navigation task as their route was to some degree visible from the old Anzac perimeter. In what became known as the Battle of Chunuk Bair, the New Zealanders failed to capture the peak by the morning of 7 August but managed the feat on the next morning.

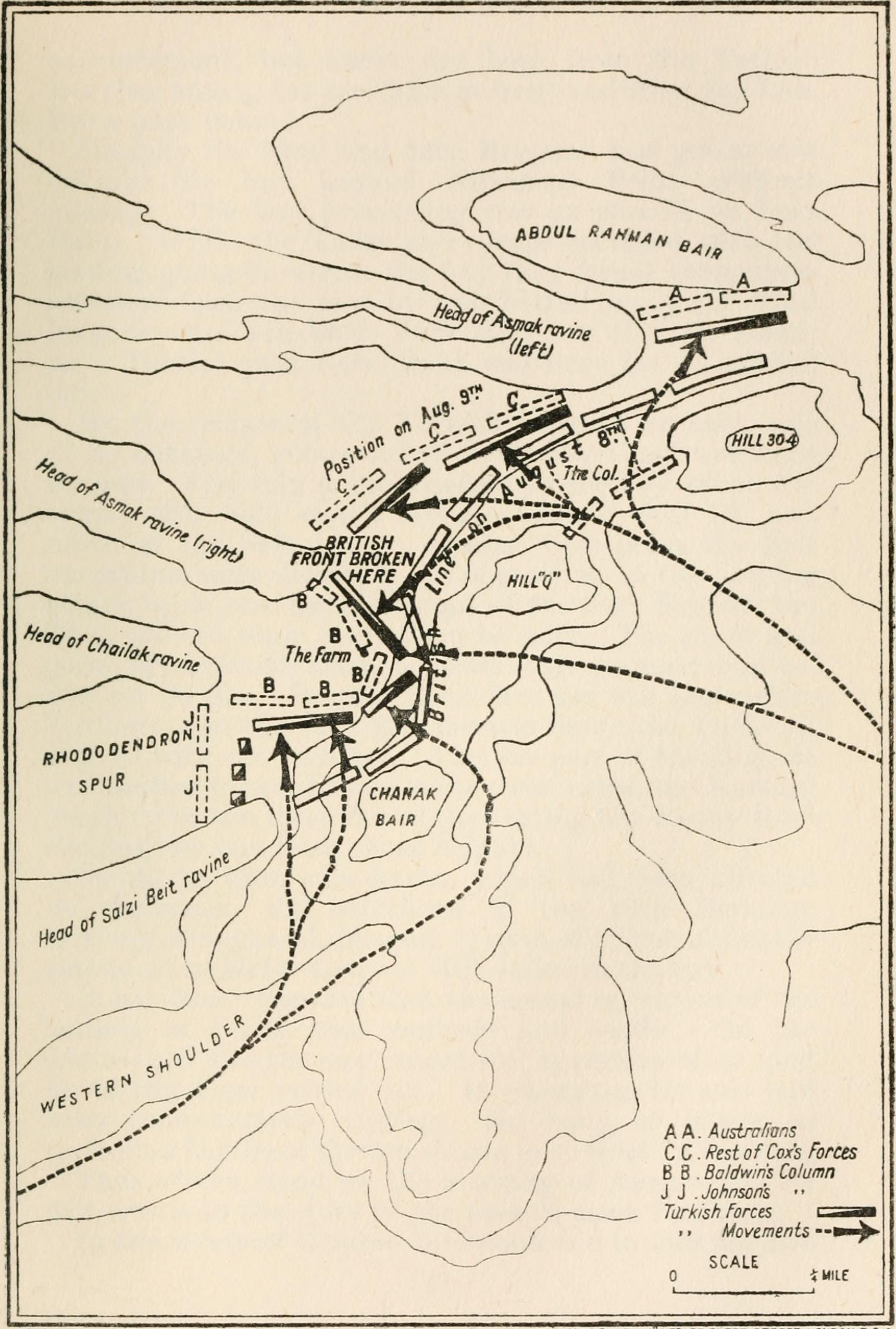
Map of the Turkish counter-attack, 9–10 August

On the morning following the breakout, a number of other attacks were planned within the old Anzac perimeter. The most notorious was the attack of the Australian 3rd Light Horse Brigade at The Nek whose slim chance of success had depended on the New Zealanders having captured Chunuk Bair on schedule.

The left column's journey through the tangled ravines was doomed to failure and, having become lost and confused, it never got close to the objective of Hill 971. By the morning of 8 August Cox's forces were sufficiently organised to attempt an attack on their original objectives of Hill 971 and Hill Q. However Monash's brigade was still mistaken about its position relative to Hill 971. In fact, by the end of the day's advance Monash's troops had actually reached the position they had believed they had been starting from. Meanwhile, Hill 971 was more unreachable than ever. The three Australian battalions that had made the assault suffered 765 casualties — the 15th Battalion was reduced to about 30 per cent of its normal strength.

Of the force aiming for Hill Q, one battalion of the 6th Gurkhas commanded by Major Cecil Allanson and joined by disparate New Army men, moved to within 200 feet of Hill Q by 6 p.m. on 8 August where they sought shelter from the heavy Ottoman fire. After a naval artillery bombardment, the battalion attacked the summit shortly after 5 a.m. on 9 August. The plan of the attack, as concocted by General Godley, had involved numerous other battalions but all were lost or pinned down so the Gurkhas went on alone. They succeeded in driving the Ottomans off the hill but were then caught in further naval gunfire from friendly monitors or from an artillery battery at Anzac. Having suffered heavy casualties and with no reinforcements, Allanson's force was pushed back off the hill shortly afterwards.

By the end of 9 August the Allies retained only a foothold on Chunuk Bair. On 10 August the Ottomans, led from the front by Colonel Mustafa Kemal, counter-attacked and regained control of the entire Sari Bair ridge.

=== Suvla landing ===
Stopford's IX Corps comprised the British 10th (Irish) and 11th Divisions. At the time of the landing on 6 August the British were confronted by three Ottoman battalions under the command of a Bavarian cavalry officer, Major Wilhelm Willmer whose task was to delay the British until reinforcements could arrive from Bulair, 30 miles (48 km) away.

Stopford, who had decided to command the landings from HMS Jonquil that was anchored offshore, slept during the attack instead. The 11th Division landed on the night of 6 August and two brigades of the 10th Division landed the following morning. The landings, made in the dark without the aid of reliable reconnaissance, suffered from the same confusion that reigned at Anzac landing on 25 April. Lighters ran aground on sandbars so that the troops had to wade some distance to get ashore. Many units became intermingled and officers were unable to locate their objectives. Lala Baba was captured by the 6th Battalion of the Yorkshire Regiment in what was the first combat action by any unit of the New Army of Lord Kitchener. The original objectives were the capture of the ridge lines to the north (Kiretch Tepe) and east (Tekke Tepe) and the line of hills to the south on the Anafarta Spur. Stopford's 'caution' and Hamilton's failure to exert his will on his subordinate commanders, meant the objectives were diluted to little more than securing the beach.

By evening on 7 August, with the chain of command breaking down, progress had become minimal. Mostly due to Stopford still "commanding" from offshore, however, a lack of supplies, especially drinking water, weren't helping matters. To the south east Chocolate Hill and Green Hill were taken in the evening with minimal resistance but constant harassment by shrapnel and sniper fire. The British suffered 1,700 casualties on the first day at Suvla.

General Sanders was incensed at the commander of the 7th and 12th divisions, Colonel Fevzi Bey, for not taking advantage of the Allied disarray at Suvla to pounce on them before they got organised. Turks not expecting a major landing at Suvla had to rush in the two divisions and Fevzi Bey dreaded night attacks, which were rarely successful. Sanders relieved Fevzi Bey immediately and gave the responsibility to Mustafa Kemal who was the commander of the 19th division and was now responsible for the front from Anzac Cove to Saros. He immediately planned for an attack along the Anafarta Hills. Given his success at Ariburnu earlier in spring, Mustafa Kemal's arrival boosted the Ottoman morale.

The first serious Allied attempt at the ridges of the Anafarta Hills to the east was made on the night of 8 August, following intervention from Hamilton but on the morning of 9 August, the Ottoman reinforcements had begun to arrive and the British were driven back. The fighting concentrated around Scimitar Hill which protruded northwards from the Anafarta Spur and dominated the southern approach to the Tekke Tepe ridge. Scimitar Hill had been captured then abandoned on 8 August; attempts to retake the hill on 9 and 10 August, were thwarted by the Ottomans. The gunfire was so intense it set the undergrowth ablaze and many of the wounded were incinerated where they lay.

As the fighting developed, the landing was reinforced by the arrival of the British 53rd Division on 9 August, followed by the 54th Division on 10 August. Stopford now had four divisions under his corps command but was faced by a similar strength of Ottoman defenders. The 53rd Division was mauled in another attack on Scimitar Hill on 10 August.

On 15 August Hamilton sacked Stopford and a number of division and brigade commanders. The command of IX Corps was given to Major-General Beauvoir De Lisle, commander of the 29th Division until Lieutenant-General Julian Byng could travel from France to assume command.

== Aftermath ==
=== Analysis ===
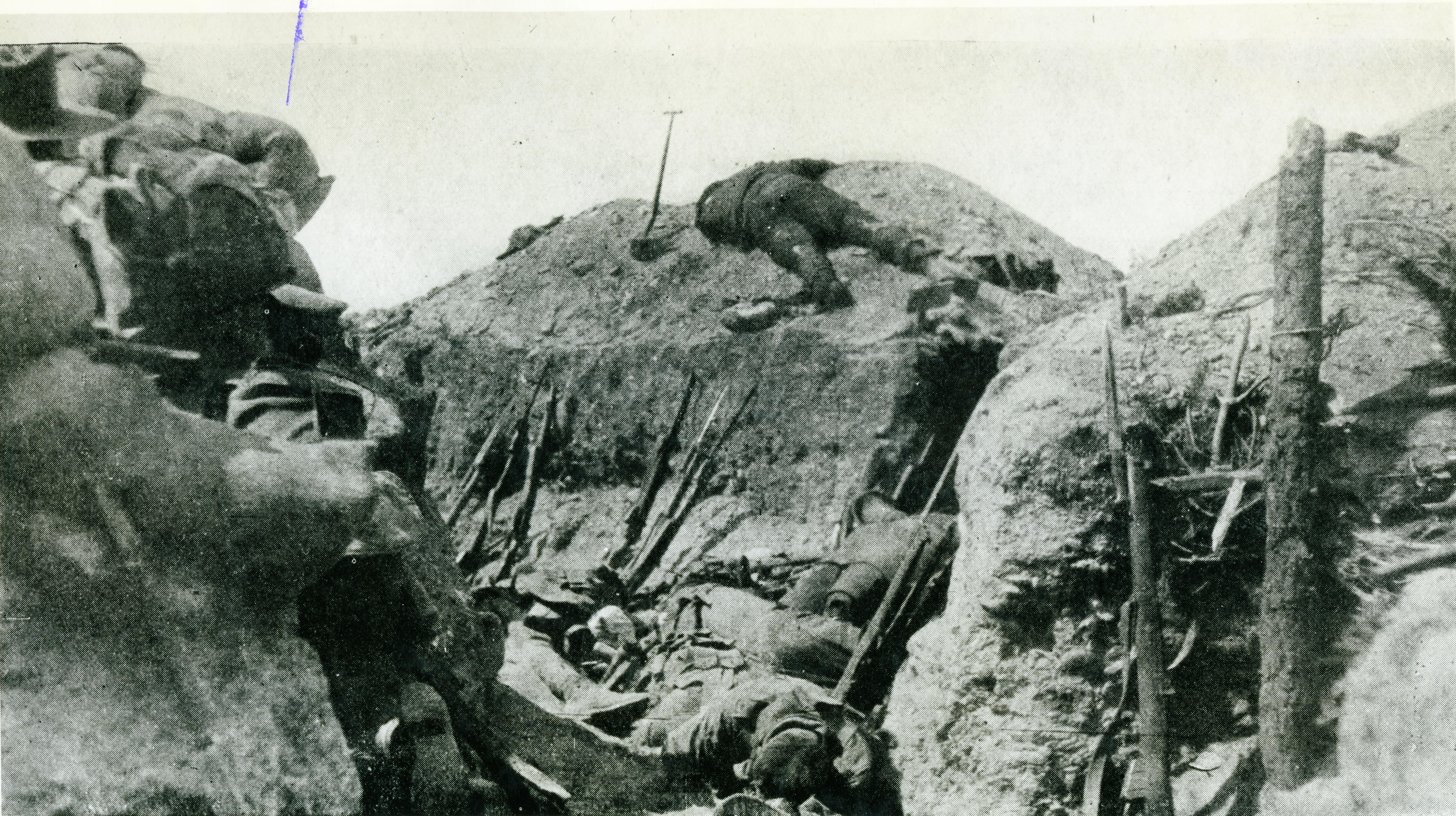
Southern Trench in Lone Pine, Gallipoli, 8 August 1915

Once the battles of 21 August had finished, the front lines at Suvla and Anzac remained static for the remainder of the campaign. Localised fighting continued but no more major advances were attempted. Many soldiers suffered or perished due to the hostile conditions they endured as a result of their poor preparation and training. Disease transmitted by mosquitoes and the lack of fresh water and shelter hampered the efforts of the division as the men were too weak to fight to their best ability. The insufficient knowledge had an impact of their advancement as their enemy were more familiar to the terrain and could ambush the division successfully. A combination of factors caused their success to be mixed.

=== Subsequent operations ===
As the shape of the new front line firmed, General Hamilton planned one further attack to try to link the Suvla landing to Anzac. This required the capture of a group of hills; Scimitar Hill and the 'W' Hills from Suvla and Hill 60 from the new Anzac sector. The attacks were to commence on 21 August. At Suvla, de Lisle had his 29th Division and the 2nd Mounted Division which had been moved to Suvla as additional reinforcements.

The 29th Division was to attack Scimitar Hill while the 11th Division was to take the W Hills on the south of the Anafarta Spur. The 2nd Mounted Division was in reserve near Lala Baba on the far side of the salt lake. This attack was the largest mounted by the Allies at Gallipoli. Scimitar Hill was captured briefly but the attackers were driven off or killed by the defensive fire from the Ottomans higher up the spur. Once again the undergrowth ignited, burning many of the wounded. The 2nd Mounted Division were called to join the attack and advanced, marching in extended formation, straight across the salt lake, under fire the whole way. For a second time the hill was captured, briefly, before being lost for the final time. The attack of the 11th Division towards the W Hills was held up by strong Ottoman defences.

In the Anzac sector, Hill 60 had been unoccupied on the morning of 7 August, when Australian scouts passed across but the Ottomans swiftly occupied and fortified the hill. The Battle of Hill 60 lasted for eight days and while the summit was eventually reached, the Allies were unable to completely dislodge the Ottoman defenders who fought hard to hold their positions.
