= 4th Caucasus Army Corps =

Military formation

- Active: At least 1914-1918
- Country: Russian Empire
- Allegiance: Imperial Russian Army
- Engagements: World War One

The 4th Caucasus Army Corps was a military formation of the Russian Empire. It was commanded by Nikolai Yudenich. The unit fought in World War I, suffering a defeat in 1915 at the hands of the Ottomans near Malazgirt, west of Lake Van.
