= Raid on Nekhl =

Coordinates: 29.9°N 33.75°E

- Part of the Middle Eastern theatre of World War I
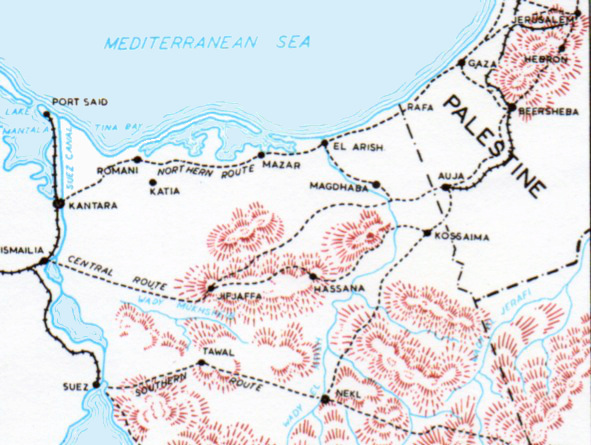
- Map of Sinai Peninsula
Date	13–21 February 1917 (1 week and 1 day)
Location	Central Sinai Peninsula
Result	British Empire victory

Belligerents
British Empire: Australia; India; United Kingdom	(Ottoman Empire) Ottoman Empire; Sinai Bedouin

Commanders and leaders
(Australia) W. Grant	(Ottoman Empire) Sir Fuad

Units involved
11th Light Horse Regiment; No. 9 Coy Imperial Camel Corps; British Yeomanry and Indian mounted units	

Strength
420 + and 3 aircraft	64 to 130 Ottoman and Bedouin garrison

Casualties and losses
None	1 dead and 11 prisoners

The Raid on Nekhl (February 1917) was the second of three battles by British forces to recapture the Sinai Peninsula during the Sinai and Palestine Campaign of World War I. Egyptian Expeditionary Force (EEF) mounted forces travelled into the centre of the Sinai Peninsula to attack and push the last Ottoman Army garrisons back into Palestine.

Nekhl had been a regional centre for British administration until the beginning of the war when Ottoman Empire forces invaded the area. During the Raid on the Suez Canal in February 1915 part of the attacking force had moved through Nekhl.

By February 1917 the Ottoman garrisons in the region were well behind the EEF front line. As the occupation of Southern Palestine began these isolated forces were attacked and pushed back into Ottoman Palestine.

== Background ==
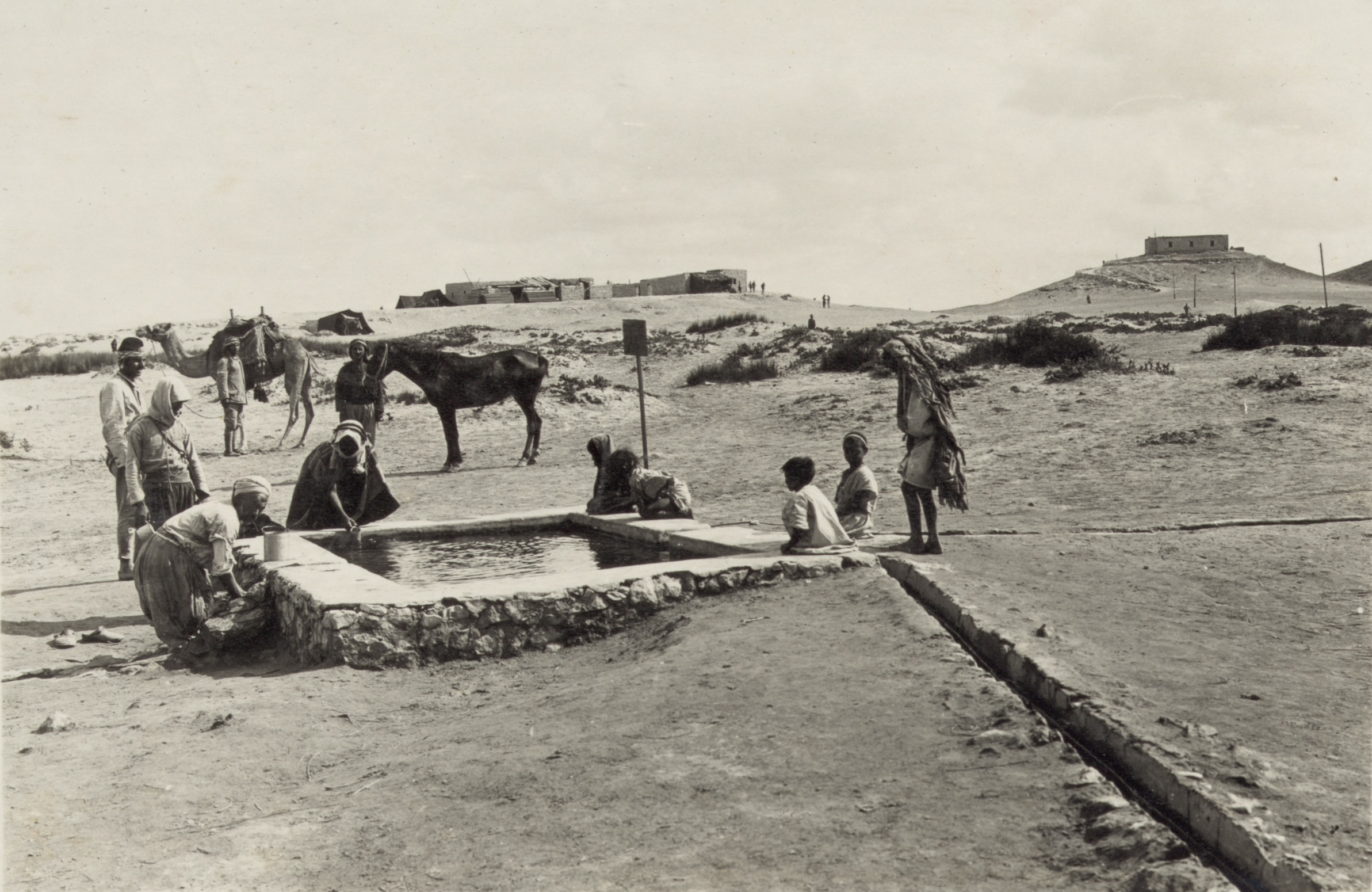
Kuseimeh also known as el Kossaima

Both the coast road via El Arish, and the road from Ma'an via Nekhl to the Suez Canal were guarded by British ships on the Mediterranean coast and the Gulf of Aqaba respectively. Kress von Kressenstin's force which attacked the canal in February 1915 had moved along the central way across the Sinai desert making use of the water available at Kossaima and Nekhl. Ottoman forces continued to occupy the area on the central way across the Sinai south from el Kossaima towards the Suez Canal, including Bir el Hassana and Nekhl, which was a town of about 50 mud and stone houses, with a mosque and a fort. Located in an area where lack of water and extreme climate made sustained warfare by either side impossible, Nekhl had been an important outpost at the beginning of the war, for the British administration 60 miles (97 km) east of Suez. By 1917 it was still an important outpost from which Ottoman authority over the Arabs and Bedouin could be reinforced.

== Prelude ==
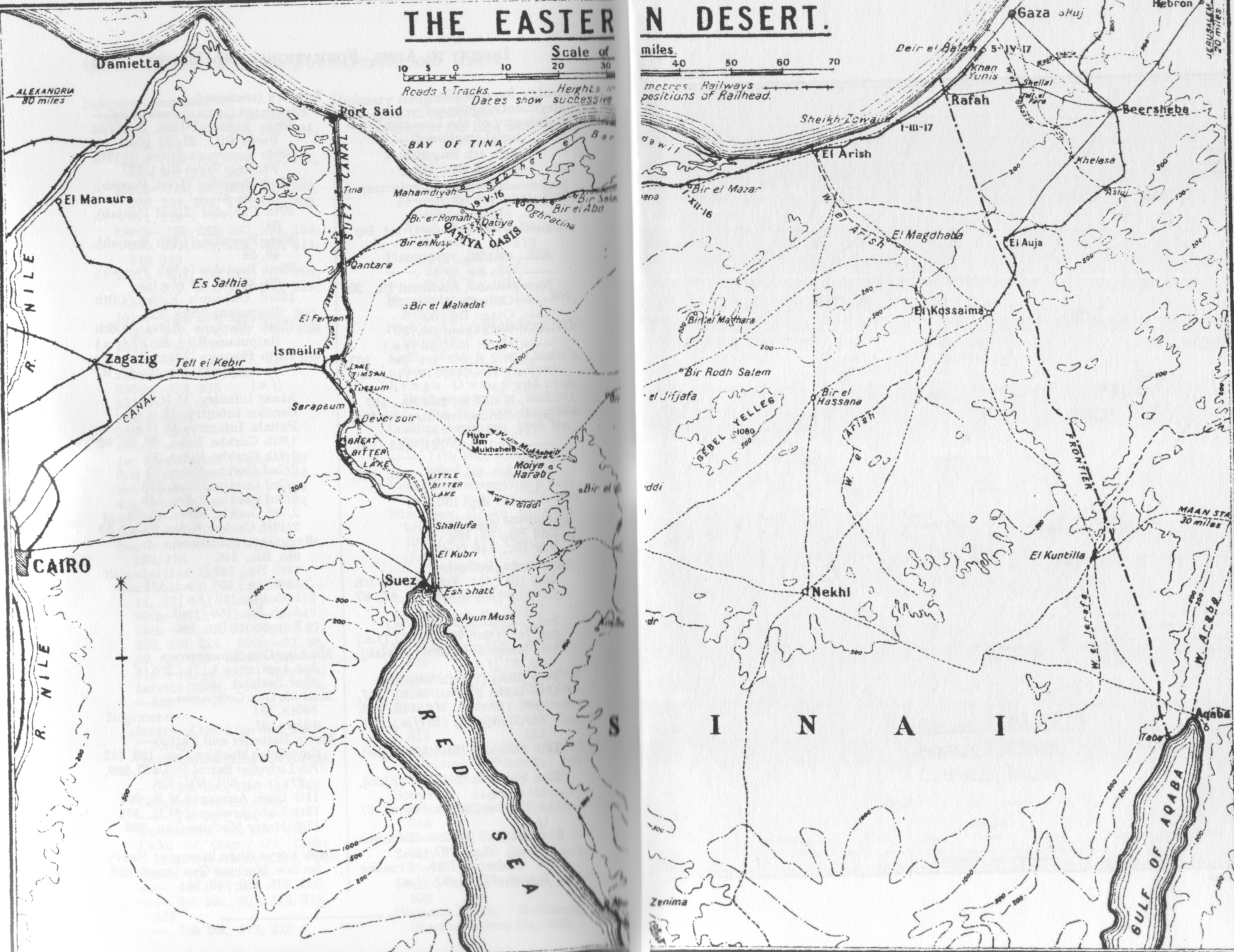
Sinai Peninsula

The final actions of the Sinai Campaign were ordered by General Murray against Nekhl and Bir el Hassana. Intelligence Branch of the General Staff had advised that after withdrawing from the Sinai as a result of the EEF advance along the coastal road, a force of 130 hostile soldiers was still deployed at Nekhl. On 6 February Southern Canal Section ordered the 11th Light Horse Regiment, commanded by Lieutenant Colonel W. Grant, to prepare for operations against Nekhl including the cutting of communications between Nekhl and el Auja. El Auja was linked to northern Palestine via Beersheba. A second column was to march from Magdhaba to attack Bir el Hassana 40 miles (64 km) north of Nekhl between the Gebel Helal and the Gebel Yelleg.

Two mounted columns set out from the Suez Canal on 13 February 1917. Northern Column consisting of 420 troopers in the 11th Light Horse Regiment, one Royal Engineer officer and four other ranks, one Royal Army Medical Corps (RAMC) officer with a detachment from 124th Field Ambulance Str. 26, one Royal Flying Corps (RFC) officer and two other ranks and two wireless pack stations, rode out from Serapeum near Ismailia in the centre of the Canal. Lieutenant Colonel A. W. Jennings Bramly (an Egyptian Government officer with knowledge of the country), Captain F. D. Stirling (General Staff GHQ), and Lieutenant A. H. Stuart (Intelligence Branch, General Staff), along with one aircraft observer and two mechanics to choose advanced landing ground and supervise the transportation of petrol, oil and spare parts accompanied the force. By 14 February the column concentrated at Zogna where a supply dump had been established. Meanwhile, Southern Column consisting of the 6th Mounted Brigade headquarters, with yeomanry from this brigade, and the Indian 58th Rifles rode out from Suez at the southern end of the Suez Canal, via Heniak, Ayun Sudr, the Mitla Pass and the Darb el Haj towards Nekhl. Three aircraft from No. 1 Squadron based at El Arish worked from the aerodrome of No. 57 Reserve Squadron at Ismailia during the raid, were to report daily on the progress of the two columns, drop messages from headquarters and scout ahead. while a yeomanry force marched from Suez via the Mitla Pass and the Darb el Haj.

Northern Column advanced to Bir el Giddi on 15 February where a detachment of 60 rifles from No. 9 Company, Imperial Camel Corps joined the column from Shallufa. Here an officer's patrol commanded by Lieutenant Farlow reported the Themada wells silted up and no water was available there. Instead of the proposed three nights, this information meant only two nights could be spent at an advanced base to be established near Nekhl. As a result, a group was sent ahead by Northern Column to Themada to do their best to obtain a water supply, while that column followed from Bir el Giddi in cold and wet weather, after giving the horses time to get a good drink. On arrival at Themada four wells had been dug to an average of 8 feet (2.4 m), each of the wells had 4 feet (1.2 m) of water which was maintained during pumping water for the whole regiment.

Major Bassett commanding 2nd Battalion (British), Imperial Camel Corps, marched from Magdhaba on 17 February to surround Bir el Hassana, where at dawn the next morning they attacked the Ottoman Army garrison consisting of three officers and 19 other ranks, reinforced by armed Bedouin. During the attack a severely wounded soldier was flown back to El Arish by aircraft. After the surrender of Bir el Hassana, Bassett's force remained in position to capture any Ottoman force withdrawing back from Nekhl towards Bir el Hassana. (Note: These units have been described as marching from El Arish. [Falls 1930 Vol. 1 p. 277])

== Raid ==
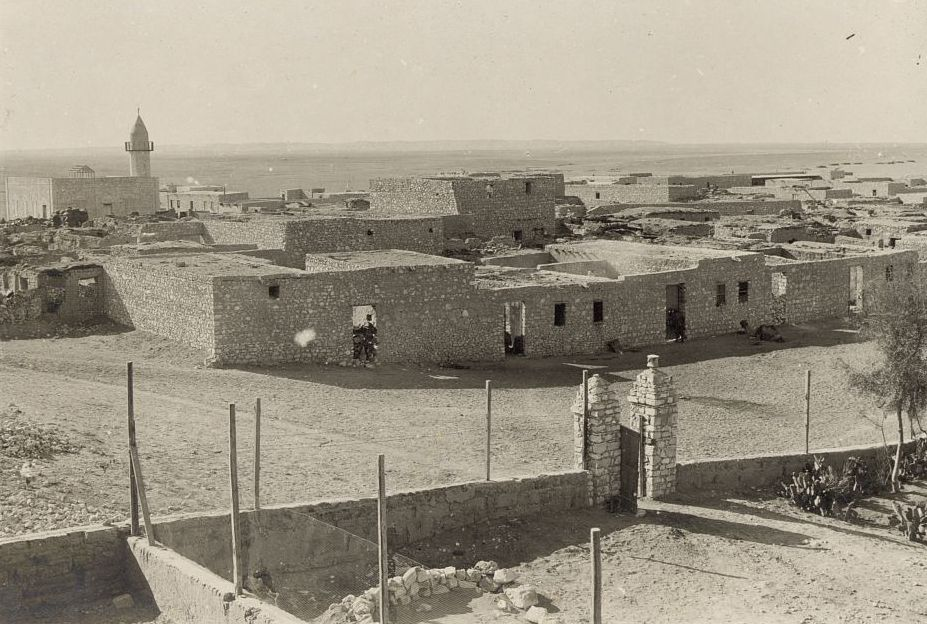
View of Nakhl from the castle

On 17 February Northern Column sent an officers' patrol commanded by Lieutenant F. C. Farlow to select a site for an advanced base and to reconnoitre the Thilwetl el Thamamat Pass, 4 miles (6.4 km) north of Nekhl. The patrol reported at 15:30 that three shots had been fired from high ground on the Bir el Hassana road shortly after 13:00 by a Bedouin who subsequently withdrew on his camel towards Nekhl. By 16:00 Northern Column reached 7 miles (11 km) north of Nekhl where an advanced base was established.

The Farlow's patrol sent back a report which was received at 16:45 that the pass was unoccupied but that men could be seen withdrawing from Nekhl towards the east. Farlow requested support "as he was pushing on in pursuit" and 'B' Squadron 11th Light Horse Regiment rode out at 17:10. Meanwhile, Farlow's patrol captured four enemy soldiers with ten camels but they were prevented from crossing the plain by rifle fire from about 50 defenders in the foothills where the Nekhl to Akaba road leaves the plain to the east of Nekhl. An aircraft which landed at Grant's advanced base shortly after 'B' Squadron left, was sent to reconnoitre Nekhl. It returned at 17:40 to report the town unoccupied and no sign of any enemy soldiers on the roads to the east. 'B' Squadron, commanded by Captain C. A. R. Munro entered Nekhl at 19:45 "riding with fixed bayonets." Two Bedouin and one Ottoman soldier were captured in the town. The 100 cavalry garrison at Nekhl, warned by Bedouin of the British advance, had withdrawn in the direction of Aqaba. They left behind a field gun and 11 prisoners. As it was dark further movement was impossible and the squadron bivouacked in the town with a defensive cordon while the plain was patrolled during the night. All three aircraft landed at Bir el Themada where they camped with Northern Column during a very cold night. (Note: The airmen probably camped with Northern Column at the advanced base. [Grant 1917 p. 3])

During the evening of 17 February two prisoners disclosed that six Ottoman soldiers were expected to return that evening from Bir el Hassana with rations. A detachment from the Imperial Camel Brigade sent to intercept them, captured six camels with stores while the two Bedouin driving the camels, escaped.

At 04:00 on 18 February, the main force of Northern Column left their advanced base and entered Nekhl at 06:00 when two more prisoners and abandoned arms, ammunition and stores were captured. Patrols sent out eastwards up to a distance of 15 miles (24 km) failed to find any hostile soldiers. Heliographic communication was established by Northern Column with Southern Column at 08:30; that column reaching Nekhl at 09:05. After a thorough search of the town and the demolishing of a captured field gun, Southern Column commenced their return journey at 10:30. Later another two Arab were found hiding in the hills along with one Ottoman soldiers who was killed while trying to escape.

== Aftermath ==
Prisoners' statements reported Nekhl had been garrisoned by 40 armed Bedouin and 24 Ottoman soldiers, commanded by an Ottoman officer and an Arab Faud Effendi, both of whom escaped. Telegraph and telephone wires were cut and posts removed before Northern Column returned to their advanced base for the night. They began their journey back on the morning of 19 February travelling via Bir el Giddi where the Northern Column camped on 20 and 21 February.

Southern and Northern Columns made the round trip of some 120 miles (190 km) in harsh desert conditions. Daily rations weighing 4 pounds (1.8 kg) and one gallon of water per man and 20 pounds (9.1 kg) of compressed fodder and six gallons per horse were transported by 1600 camels of 'N' and 'Q' Companies of the Camel Transport Corps commanded by Captain Swallow. The camels, practically all of which were Somalis worked well, covering more than 20 miles (32 km) a day. Communications were maintained by the two wireless telegraph pack sections with Northern Column but communication with Southern Column was only by aircraft messages or visual signalling which was difficult in the country the two columns moved through.

The aircraft kept contact with the two columns as they converged from the east and south on Nekhl, dropping messages from headquarters and scouting ahead when necessary. On 17 February when the columns were not far from Nekhl, air reconnaissance found the village abandoned and an extensive air reconnaissance the next day found no sign of the enemy in the area 17 miles (27 km) beyond Nekhl. However, late arrival of aircraft and engine trouble meant important messages to General Pitt were never delivered. Aerial reconnaissance also had difficulty finding small groups of troops, one aircraft failed to see the whole of Northern Column when it flew over.

== See also ==
- First Battle of Gaza
- Battle of Rafa
