= Battle of Çapakçur =

1916 battle in the Caucasus during WWI

Battle's of Çapakçur
- Part of Battle of Muş during Caucasus campaign of World War I
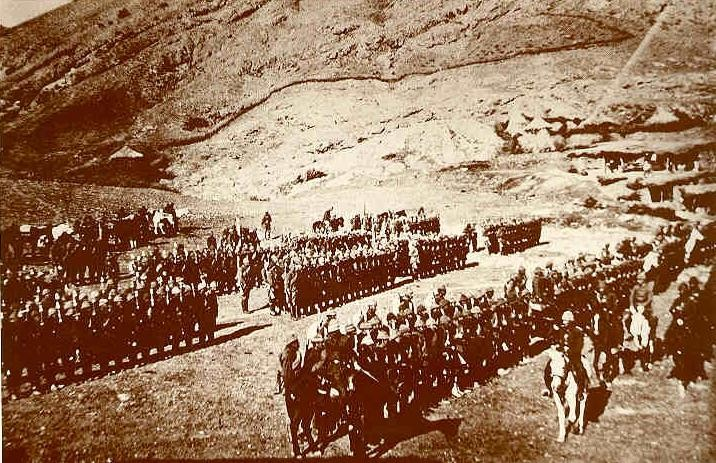
Date	2–7 August 1916
Location	Bingöl
Result	Ottoman victory
Territorial changes	Ottoman forces temporarily recapture Muş and Bitlis

Belligerents
Ottoman Empire	Russian Empire

Commanders and leaders
(Ottoman Empire) Mustafa Kemal Pasha (Ottoman Empire) Ali Fuat Pasha	Unknown

Casualties and losses
Unknown	30,000

The Çapakçur Battles were battles fought in 1916 between the Imperial Russian forces and the Ottoman Army for the city of Çapakçur. The battle is part of the Turkish 2nd Army's offensive.

== Events ==
The Ottoman army, which fought against the Russians on the Caucasus front, suffered great casualties due to the harsh winter conditions. The Russians took Bitlis and Muş and advanced towards the west. As the army was insufficient, militia forces were organized from the people of the region and the Russians were tried to be stopped. The militia forces formed from the tribes in Çapakçur, Genç, Solhan and Kiğı defended the region under difficult conditions. Mustafa Kemal Pasha and his comrades-in-arms, who were assigned to the region after the Gallipoli victory, succeeded in pushing the Russians back within today's Bingöl borders with the support of the militia forces. The Turks temporarily returned Muş and Bitlis, but it was soon retaken by the Russians.

== Aftermath ==
On August 8, the Turks regained the Muş and Bitlis, the battle turned out to be a major success, but on August 23, the Russians returned the territories captured by the Turks and so severely drained the 2nd army that it could not advance until the end of the war.

== Literature ==
- Олейников, Алексей (2016). Россия-щит Антанты. С предисловием Николая Старикова. St. Petersburg: Питер. ISBN 978-5-496-01795-4.
