= XVI Corps (Ottoman Empire) =

XVI Corps On Altıncı Kolordu
- Active: 1915–
- Country: Ottoman Empire
- Type: Corps

Commanders
- Notable commanders: Miralay Kannengiesser Bey; Mirliva Mustafa Kemal Pasha (August 19, 1915-March 7, 1916)

The XVI Corps of the Ottoman Empire (Turkish: 16 ncı Kolordu or On Altıncı Kolordu) was one of the corps of the Ottoman Army. It was formed during World War I.

== Formations ==
=== Order of Battle, August 1916, December 1916 ===
In August 1916, December 1916, the corps was structured as follows:

- XVI Corps (Caucasus)
  - 5th Division, 8th Division

=== Order of Battle, August 1917 ===
In August 1917, the corps was structured as follows:

- XVI Corps (Caucasus)
  - 5th Division, 8th Division

== Sources ==
- Edward J. Erickson, Ordered to Die: A History of the Ottoman Army in the First World War, Greenwood Press, 2001, ISBN 0-313-31516-7
