= Battle of Tobruk (1911) =

Part of the Italo-Turkish War

Battle of Nadura Hill
- Part of the Italo-Turkish War
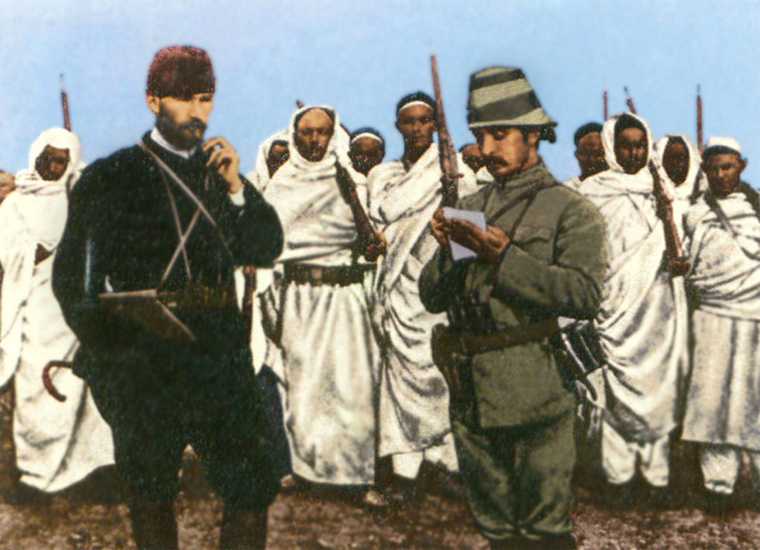
- Young officer Mustafa Kemal dictating a letter
Date	22 December 1911
Location	Nadura Hill near Tobruk, Ottoman Tripolitania (now Libya) 32°4′34″N 23°57′41″E
Result	Ottoman–Senussi victory

Belligerents
Kingdom of Italy	Ottoman Empire; Senussi Order

Commanders and leaders
(Kingdom of Italy) Carlo Caneva	(Ottoman Empire) Mustafa Kemal (Ottoman Empire) Enver Pasha; Al Mabri Yaseen †

Strength
(Kingdom of Italy) 5,000+ soldiers	(Ottoman Empire) 1,000+ soldiers

The Battle of Tobruk (1911) or Nadura Hill Battle occurred on 22 December 1911 during the Italo-Turkish War for the control of the Nadura Hill near Tobruk (a city the Italians had occupied in October). The battle was a small engagement primarily known for the involvement and leadership of future Turkish president Mustafa Kemal Atatürk.

== Background ==
The First Fleet of the Italian naval forces, commanded by Vice-admiral Augusto Aubry, approached Tobruk on 3 October and invaded the city the next day without encountering any serious opposition. The Ottoman forces were organized by Enver Bey (later Enver Pasha) after trivial clashes on 9 November. The leader of the Tripolitanian Bedouin force was Sheik Muberra (Al Mabri Yaseen), who was backed by his "Meryem" clan and other Senussi volunteers.

== Battle ==
In the first week of December 1911 Italian soldiers captured the Nadura Hill in Mureyra Valley and were busy digging trenches and preparing fortifications while they waited for reinforcements.

Captain Mustafa Kemal was in command of the Tobruk region and foresaw that the consolidation of Italian forces would jeopardize his position. As such, Kemal ordered Sheik Muberra to attack as soon as possible to prevent the reinforcement of the Italians on Nadura Hill. At the same time, Turkish soldiers and Tripolitanian volunteers under the command of Enver Pasha were ordered to attack the Italians on Nadura Hill. Enver Pasha's force approached Nadura Hill just before dawn and attacked. The Italians were surprised and responded in a disorganized fashion without the benefit of cannon fire. Nadura Hill was captured in two hours and the Italian Bersaglieri retreated to Tobruk while leaving three machine guns along with munitions.

Meanwhile, Sheik Muberra and his force, consisting of a thousand soldiers, attacked the Italian reinforcements who were to support the Italians on Nadura Hill. Sheik Muberra, however, was shot and killed along with ten Tripolitanian volunteers. After five hours of fighting, the Italians were forced to retreat to Tobruk.

== Aftermath ==
Tobruk remained in Italian hands but the battle, although a secondary engagement, hindered the Italian advance into the interior beyond Tobruk in December 1911. The Italians later reinforced all of their beachhead enclaves in Tripolitania and Cyrenaica in January 1912.

== See also ==
- Balkan Wars
