= Battle of Derna (1912) =

Part of the Italo-Turkish War

Battle of Sidi Abdullah
- Part of the Italo-Turkish War
Date	3 March 1912
Location	Derna, Ottoman Tripolitania (now Libya) 32°45′20.21″N 22°38′15.88″E
Result	Ottoman victory

Belligerents
Kingdom of Italy	Ottoman Empire; Senussi Order

Commanders and leaders
(Kingdom of Italy) Luigi Capello	Mustafa Kemal Bey; İsmail Enver Bey; Ahmed Sharif as-Senussi

Strength
(Kingdom of Italy) 15,000–16,000	8 officers 160 soldiers 7,742 Arabs

Casualties and losses
150–200	Unknown

The Battle of Derna, also known as the Battle of Sidi Abdullah (Arabic: معركة سيدي عبد الله), occurred near Derna on 3 March 1912, during the Italo-Turkish War. The battle took place between the Italians led by Luigi Capello and Ottoman-Senussi Forces led by Enver Pasha and Ahmed Sharif as-Senussi. Derna remained under Italy's control after the battle, while Italian prospects to advance into the interior were hindered by the fact that the Ottoman-Senussi remained in control of the Jebel Akhdar highlands.
