= Battle of Muş =

1916 battle between the Russian and Ottoman Empires

- Part of the Caucasus campaign of World War I
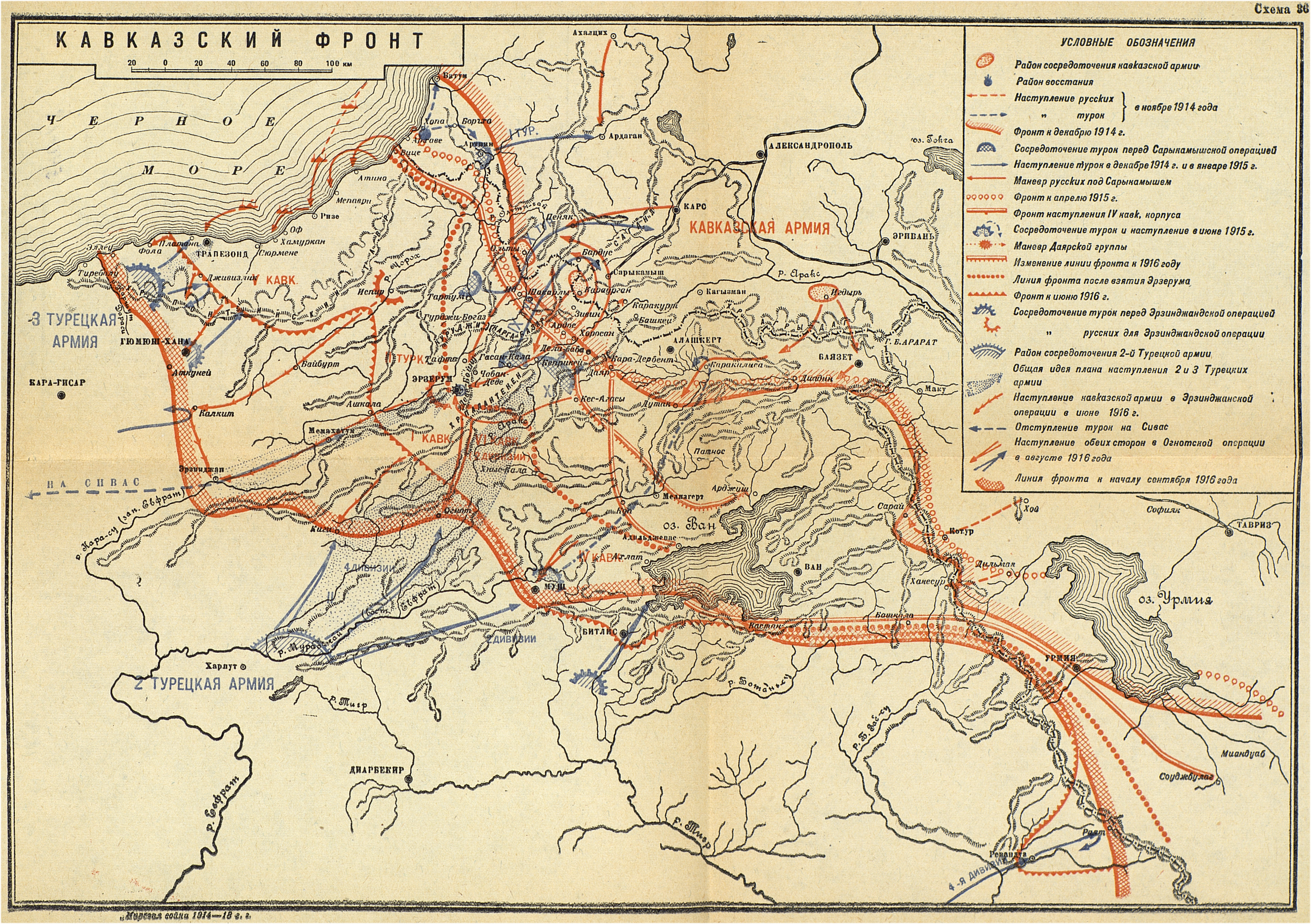
- Map of military operations on the Caucasus campaign in 1914–1916 by Andrei Zayonchkovski
Date	3 August 1916 – 24 August 1916
Location	Muş, Ottoman Empire
Result	Russian victory
Territorial changes	Russian recapture of Muş and Bitlis

Belligerents
Ottoman Empire	Russian Empire: Armenian volunteer units

Commanders and leaders
Ahmed Izzet Pasha; Mustafa Kemal Pasha; Faik Pasha †	Nikolai Istomin; Nikolai Yudenich; Tovmas Nazarbekian

Units involved
Second Army	Russian Caucasus Army; Armenian Fedayi

Strength
81,000–120,000 men	50,000 men

Casualties and losses
56,000–60,000 killed, wounded or captured	20,000 killed, wounded and captured

The Battle of Muş, also known as the Ognot campaign, took place during World War I in the southeastern Anatolian region of the Ottoman Empire (present-day Turkey), between forces of the Ottoman Empire and the Russian Empire. One of the commanders involved in the battle was Mustafa Kemal, who later became known as Atatürk, the founder of the Republic of Turkey. The battle resulted in a Russian victory. After about three weeks of fighting, the Russians captured the city of Muş. The Ottoman Second Army suffered heavy casualties and was nearly destroyed.

== Battle ==
Following major Russian victories in the northern theater, as well as the Russian capture of Bitlis in the south, the Ottoman forces faced significant setbacks. The Ottomans were forced to redeploy troops, including veterans from the successful defense of Gallipoli against Russia's Western allies.

On 3 August, with a significant manpower advantage of 2.5 to 1, the Ottomans launched a general offensive against Russian forces along the entire front. After heavy fighting, the Russians abandoned Muş by 8 August. Ultimately, however, the 1st Russian Division managed to turn the tide and decisively defeat four Ottoman divisions. Due to the remote location, the initial phase of the battle presented logistical challenges for the Russians, who in some areas faced Ottoman forces which outnumbered them as much as 4 to 1.

Through fierce resistance, as well as the effective deployment of new mobile artillery, the Russians inflicted significant casualties on the Ottomans. Seizing the opportunity, Russian General Nikolai Yudnich launched a counteroffensive against Ottoman force across the entire front.

The Russians recaptured Muş on 23 August. Ottoman General Faik Pasha was reportedly killed during the battle. Some sources place General Pasha's death on 24 August or 25 August. However, other sources claim that he died after the battle, on 30 August.

== Aftermath ==
The Ottomans' defeat in the Battle of Muş solidified Russia's military dominance. In the aftermath, the Ottoman Second Army suffered heavy losses at the hands of Russian artillery, and it was eventually reduced to the size of a corps.

== Literature ==
- Tucker, Spencer (2002). The Great War 1914-1918. UCL Press. ISBN 1-85728-390-2.
- Reynolds, Michel (2011). Shattering empires : the clash and collapse of the Ottoman and Russian empires, 1908-1918. Cambridge university press. ISBN 978-0-521-19553-9.
- Kernosovsky, Anton (1938). "Борьба на Кавказе" [Struggle in Caucasus]. История русской армии [History of the Russian army] (PDF).
- Oleynikov, Alexei (2016). Россия-щит Антанты [Russia-Shield of Entente]. Foreword by Nikolai Starikov. St.Petersburg: Piter. ISBN 978-5-496-01795-4.
- Allen W. E. D., Muratoff P. P. Caucasian Battlefields: A History of the Wars on the Turco-Caucasian Border. 1828—1921 (англ.). — Cambridge: CUP, 1953. — 614 p. — ISBN 978-1-108-01335-2
- Zayonchkovski, Andrey (2002) [1929]. Первая Мировая Война [The First World War]. St.Petersburg: Poligon. ISBN 5-89173-174-6.
- Jaques, Tony (2006). Dictionary of Battles. Volume 1; "While Russian General Nikolai Yudenich seized Erzincan, Ahmet Izzet Pasha's Second Army advanced against the Russian left flank, where his corps cammder Mustafa Kemal seized Bitlis and Muş. Yudenich counter-attacked and, after prolonged combat west of Lake Van, he retook Bitlis and the Turks abandoned Muş before winter ended the fighting". Greenwood Press.
- Gerald, Herman (1992). The Pivotal Conflict: A Comprehensive Chronology of the First World War, 1914-1919. Westport: Greenwood Press. ISBN 0-313-22793-4.
