= Shiraz expedition =

Swedish military expedition in Persia

- Part of the Swedish volunteers in Persia
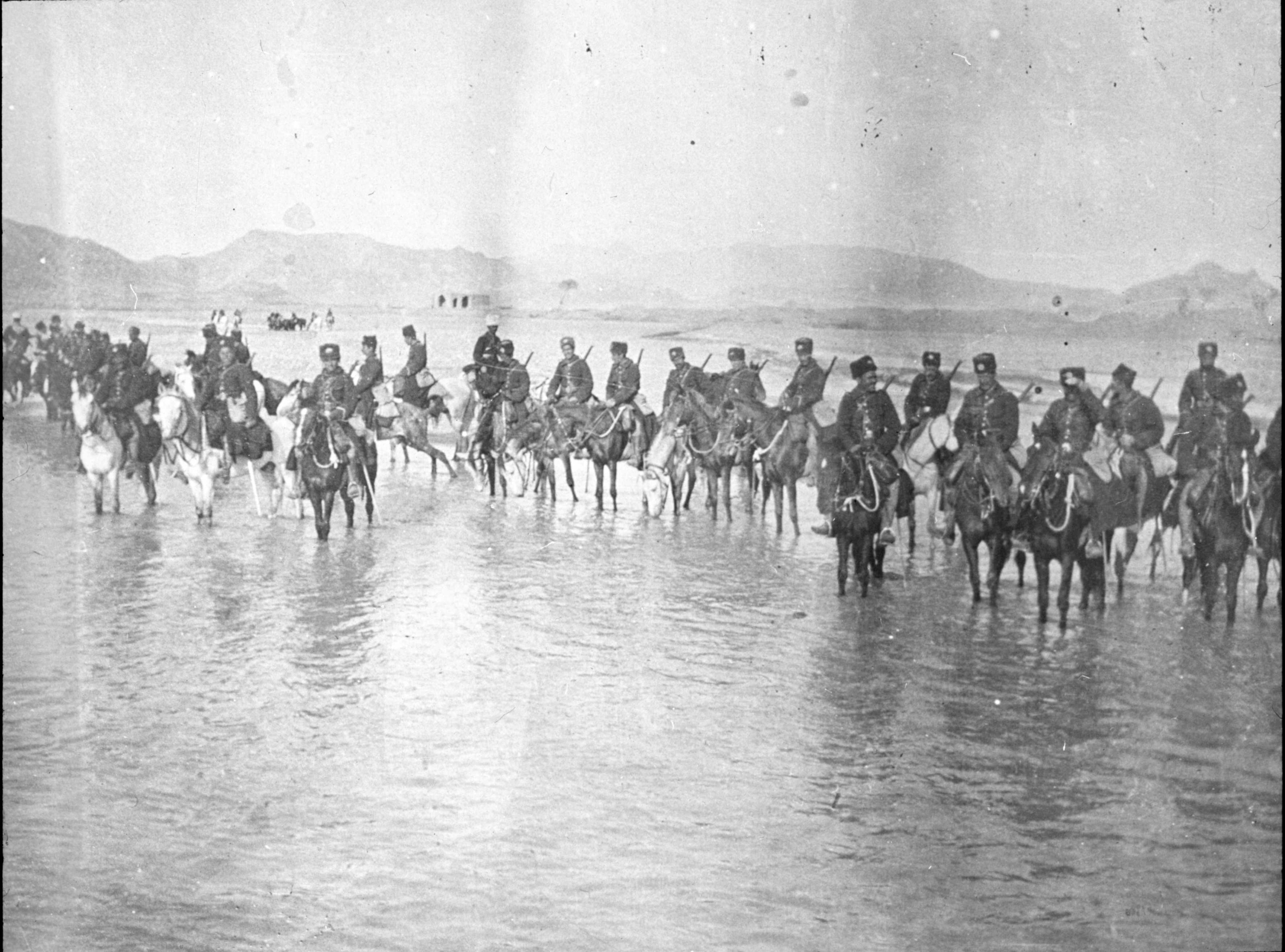
- During the Swedish intervention in Persia, Joesf Pousette had the task of reaching Chiraz with a small part of the Persian gendarmerie.
Date	1913–1915
Location	Shiraz, Persia
Result	Gendarmerie victory: The gendarmerie reaches Shiraz; Victory at Kazerun

Belligerents
Persian gendarmerie	Insurgents

Commanders and leaders
Josef Pousette	Mohammed Ali and other insurgent leaders

Casualties and losses
At least 1 Swede and several gendarmes	Unknown

The Shiraz expedition (Swedish: Shiraz-expeditionen) was an expedition led by Josef Pousette to link up with the third regiment of the Persian gendarmerie which was stationed in Shiraz.

== Background ==
Shortly after the arrival of the Swedish officers during the Swedish intervention in Persia, general Harald Hjalmarson chose to split up the gendarmerie into different regiments, one being stationed in Shiraz. Captain Josef Pousette would be the one chosen to be in charge of the regiment in Shiraz, though Shiraz was 800 kilometers away which would be cleared on horseback.

== Road to Shiraz ==
Not much is known about the actual journey to Shiraz, though Pousette stated that at an overnight stay, he became "lifelong" friends with an insurgent.

== Operations in Shiraz and the battles of Kazerun ==
While at Shiraz, Pousette was to patrol an important stretch of road to the town of Bushir, where they would engage several insurgents under Mohammed Ali in the Battles of Kazerun. The battles were bloody but it did end up being a costly gendarmerie victory, losing several gendarmes and at least one Swede. However Kazerun was not the only battle fought while at Shiraz, as some of the bloodiest battles during the Swedish intervention occurred in and around Shiraz.

Besides military actions, Pousette met with German leadership in Shiraz.

== See also ==
- Persian campaign (World War I)
