= Kermanshah operation =

- Part of Persian campaign
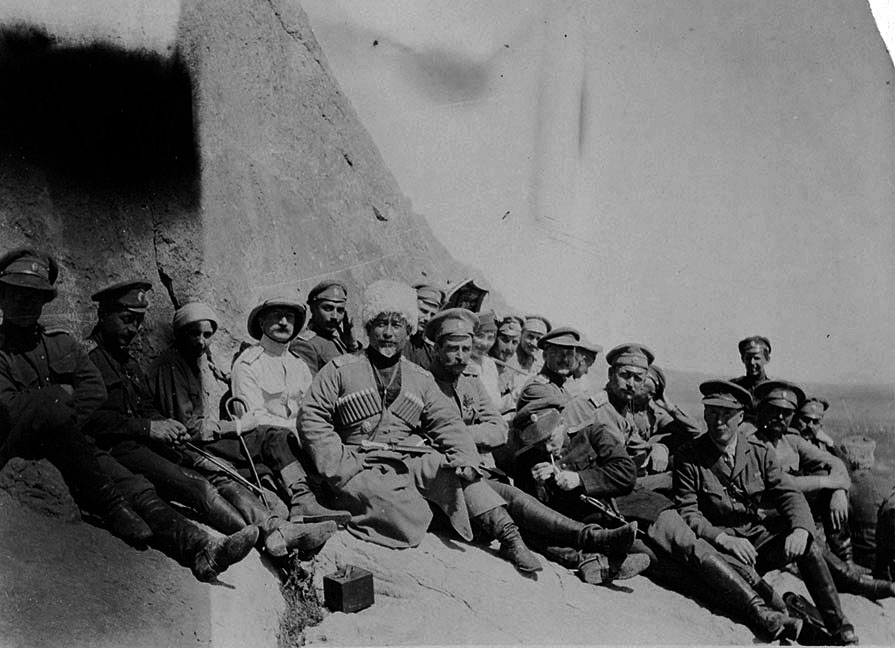
- General Baratov among his army before the operation started
Date	February – March 1916
Location	Kermanshah, Qajar Iran
Result	Russian victory

Belligerents
(Russian Empire) 1st Caucasian Cavalry Corps	Persian gendarmes Persian fedayeen tribal militias (German Empire) German volunteers (Ottoman Empire) Sixth Army

Commanders and leaders
(Russian Empire) Nikolai Baratov	Reżāqoli Khan Neẓām-al-Salṭana Māfi (German Empire) Colonel Bup (Ottoman Empire) Shevket Bay

Strength
8,000 men	12,000 including 6,000 horsemen

Kermanshah operation (Russian: Керманшахская операция, Persian: عملیات کرمانشاه) was an offensive operation of units of the Russian 1st Caucasian Cavalry Corps in Western Iran from February - March 1916 during the Persian Campaign of the First World War.

== Background ==
On December 25–30, 1915, an operation was carried out in Gilan against the Jangali rebels of Mirza Kuchek Khan, with simultaneous strikes from several sides in the difficult conditions of snow-capped mountains and forests, the rebels were defeated and for a time weakened their activity in the province. In mid-January 1916, the Ottoman forces' reconnaissance was estimated at about 21,000: 2,000 in Eqbaliyeh, 4,000 in Isfahan, and 6,000, each in Sanandaj, Hamadan and Kermanshah. On January 19, the 1st Gorsko-Mozdok regiment occupied Soltanabad. Ottoman forces retreated to Kermanshah and Borujerd; the German consul Rohner distributed a significant amount of weapons to the population before fleeing. On February 4, Colonel Stopchansky with four hundred and two guns began an offensive on Borujerd, but it developed slowly, as the troops had to march through deep snow.

On December 25, corps units took Asadabad, a detachment of border guards of Lieutenant Colonel Baron Medem and units of the 1st Caucasus Cossack Division fought in the Kengaver direction, and on January 13 took Kengaver from Ottomans. The Caucasian Cavalry Division and the 2nd and 4th Caucasian Border Foot Regiments were sent as reinforcements to General Baratov. As a result, by February 1916 the corps consisted of 14 thousand people and with 38 guns were concentrated in the Kermanshah direction.

== Conquest of Kermanshah by Ottomans ==
In the Baghdad area, the Sixth Army was formed, the commander of which was appointed on December 6, Field Marshal von der Goltz Pasha. His main goal was to fight the British Mesopotamian army, but he was also instructed to act against the Russians in the Kermanshah direction and subordinate the troops located there. Von der Goltz intensified his work on the recruitment of Persian troops and the use of Persian gendarmes led by Swedish officers. At the head of the supporters of the German-Ottoman was Nezam al-Saltaneh, the former governor of Lurestan, who fled from Qum before the Russians took it. Pro-German forces flocked to Kermanshah (120 kilometers southwest of Hamadan), which became the main center of German-Ottoman influence. Large military reserves were made in the city and large forces were drawn up: about 20 thousand people.

Meanwhile General Baratov, with 20,000 troops fighting to conquer Astarabad, was defeated Sardar Rafie Yanehsari at the beginning. But after the Ottoman forces conquered Kermanshah, General Baratov and half of his army went to conquer the lost areas, and Sardar Rafi defeated the remaining Russian forces in Astarabad.

== Offensive on Kermanshah ==
In February, units of the corps from Hamadan launched an offensive on Kermanshah. The enemy troops included 2,500 Turks, the militia of the Lurs, Bakhtiari, the remnants of the Emir Hikmat's detachment defeated at Rabat-Kerim, and the gendarmes. On the flank of the offensive, after a series of successful battles, the Defenders was driven back to the Nahavend area on February 8. From the north, the offensive of Baratov's corps was covered by the Van-Azerbaijan detachment.

The main forces moved along the highway, overcoming the stubborn resistance of the enemy, who defended every village. On February 22, corps units broke through the defensive line at Sahneh and threw back a small force of Ottoman infantry, and on February 24 occupied Bisotun. On February 26, the troops entered Kermanshah abandoned by the enemy. The captured Ottomans were the askers of the 1st Constantinople Regiment of the 21st Infantry Division. 7 guns, 8 machine guns and supplies from the Ottoman camp were taken as trophies. To consolidate in the Kermanshah region, units of the corps with battles occupied Sanandaj on March 1, Bijar on March 3, pushing the Ottomans even further to the west. At the same time Borujerd was occupied to the east.

== Aftermath ==
During the Kermanshah operation, 8 guns, 1,700 shells, 1.5 million large-caliber rifle cartridges and 100 pounds of small-caliber rifle cartridges were captured, a large number of hand bombs and explosives. Intelligence reported that the Germans were conducting unsuccessful experiments on the use of pack gas devices, which were going to be used in the defense of Kermanshah. As a result of offensive operations, the corps occupied a huge territory 800 miles wide along the front and the same depth in two and a half months. One division was located in the Kermanshah area, the other remained in the rear, in Hamadan and Qazvin. 19 March 1st Zaporozhye regiment took the former Persian capital Isfahan.
