= Vladimir Despotuli =

Vladimir Mikhailovich Despotuli (Russian: Владимир Михайлович Деспотули; German: Wladimir Michailowitsch Despotuli; Greek: Βλαδίμηρος Δεσποτούλης; Kerch 1885 – Rhineland 1977) was the publisher of Novoye Slovo, a Russian language newspaper in Germany.

He was born to a family of Russian Greeks.

During World War I, he served as adjutant lieutenant under general Nikolai Baratov, participating in the Russian expeditionary force in the Persian campaign. He also served as commander of Tehran for some time. After the Bolsheviks prevailed, he settled in Germany.

In Germany, he worked as a journalist, initially as editor and then as publisher of the Russian-language newspaper Novoye Slovo (New Word). After 1934, the newspaper became the only Russian-language newspaper in Germany. Novoye Slovo was funded by the Nazi Party's foreign affairs office and featured antisemitic and anti-Soviet articles; after the Molotov–Ribbentrop Pact, it also published articles against the Allied Forces.

He was arrested by the Gestapo in 1943 under suspicion of dealings with English spy networks. After interrogating him, the Gestapo placed him under house arrest. After the defeat of the Germans, he was arrested by the Red Army and sent to a Gulag prison for 11 years. He lived in Germany after his release in 1955 until he died in 1977.
