= 1st Caucasian Cavalry Corps =

- Active: 1813; 1915-1918
- Country: Russian Empire
- Allegiance: Imperial Russian Army
- Engagements: World War I

The 1st Caucasian Cavalry Corps (Russian, 1-й Кавказский кавалерийский корпус) was a military formation of the Russian Empire during World War I, from 1915 to 1918, and was part of the Russian Caucasus Army. The corps was formed in October 1915 from parts of the Imperial Russian Caucasian army cavalry to serve as an expeditionary force in Persia to counteract pro-German forces (Persian Campaign). It was formed under the command of the Caucasus Army, but then reorganized into the Caucasus Front in April 1917 as a result of the turmoil caused by the Russian Revolution. It changed names several times throughout the war and was disbanded in June 1918.

== Names ==
- Expeditionary Cavalry Corps in Persia (October 1915—April 28, 1916)
- Caucasian Cavalry Corps (April 29, 1916—June 1916)
- 1st Caucasian Cavalry Corps (June 1916—March 1917)
- Independent Caucasian Cavalry Corps (March 1917—March 1918)
- Caucasian Cavalry Corps (March 1918—June 1918)

== Order of Battle ==
The 1st Caucasian Cavalry Corps composed of:

- 1st Caucasus Cossack Division (Russian Empire) commanded by Lieutenant General Raddac.
  - 1st Brigade commanded by Major General Pereperlovsky.
    - 1st Uman regiment commanded by Colonel Leshchenko
    - 1st Kuban regiment commanded by Colonel Surzhikov
  - 2nd Brigade commanded by Major General Fedyushkin)
    - 1st Zaporizhzhya regiment commanded by Colonel Urchukin.
    - 1st Gorsko-Mozdok regiment commanded by Colonel Naydenov
  - 1st Caucasian Horse Artillery Division commanded by Colonel Stopchansky.
    - 2nd Kuban Cossack Battery commanded by military foreman Fedyushkin.
    - 1st Terek Cossack Battery commanded by military foreman Kochergin.

== Commanders ==
- Lieutenant General Nikolai Baratov: 1916–1917
- Lieutenant General A. A. Pavlov: 1917
- Lieutenant General Nikolai Baratov: 1917

== See also ==
- Persian Campaign
