= Swedish volunteers in Persia =

Swedish military officers in Persia (1911–1916)

- Part of the Persian campaign (1914–1918)
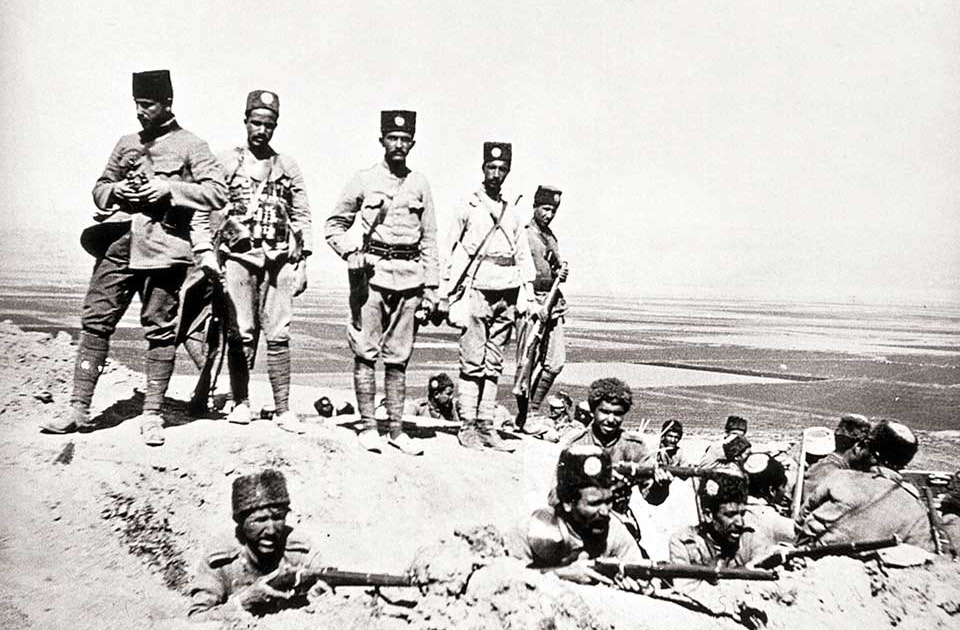
- Boroudjerd expedition
Date	1911–1916/1921
Location	Persia
Result	Indecisive, eventually a Persian victory

Belligerents
Sweden (1911–1916): Qajar Iran; (Sweden) Swedish volunteers (1916–1921)	Insurgents	United Kingdom (1914–1918) Russia (1914–1917)

Commanders and leaders
(Sweden) Harald Hjalmarson (Sweden) Josef Pousette	Mohammad Ali and others	(United Kingdom of Great Britain and Ireland) Percy Sykes (United Kingdom of Great Britain and Ireland) Lionel Dunsterville (Russian Empire) Nikolai Baratov (Russian Empire) Fyodor Chernozubov

Strength
(Sweden) ~60 ?	Several clans and villages	(United Kingdom) 51,000 (Russia) 90,000

Casualties and losses
(Sweden) 4–12, Several injured Unknown	Unknown	(United Kingdom) 3,000 (In the wider Persian theatre of World War I) (Russia) Unknown

The Swedish volunteers in Persia were a small group of military officers active in Persia between 1911 and 1916. The goal was to quell regional uprisings and modernize the Persian army, but as a result of pressure from Russia and the United Kingdom, Sweden decided to call back most of their officers during World War I.

== Background ==
Persia was rather unstable in the early 1900s, making the roads difficult to traverse due to frequent raiding by insurgents. Because of this (and fearing British intervention), the Persian government searched for a neutral power that could help modernize and create a gendarmerie able to fight off the insurgents. Sweden was considered suitable for the task and the first military officers were deployed under General Harald Hjalmarson in 1911.

== 1911–1914 ==
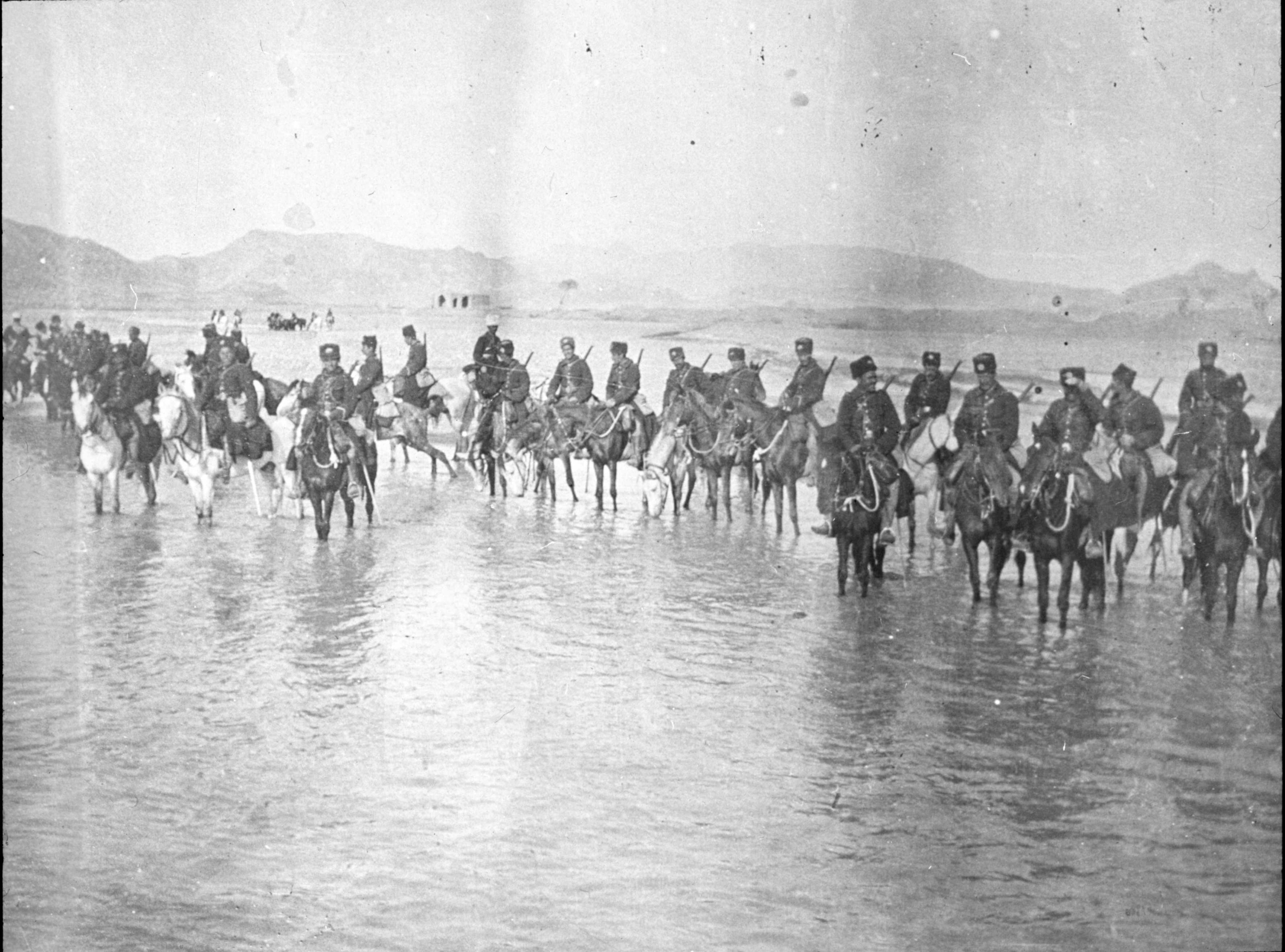
The gendarmes crossing a river during the Chiraz expedition

The gendarmes were put in charge of patrolling around 1,700 kilometers of road and steadily grew in number. They had several run-ins with clan members and insurgents and scored many victories, even killing a local chieftain. The bloodiest battles occurred in Kazerun in 1914 when several gendarmes died fighting under Josef Pousette (who had been injured fighting against insurgents in Tehran). The Swedes also conducted several expeditions throughout Persia, such as the Boroudjerd expedition and the Shiraz expedition. Even though the battles were bloody and Swedish officers were at serious risk in Persia, many decided to join the gendarmes attracted by better pay and opportunities than in Sweden.

== 1914–1916 ==
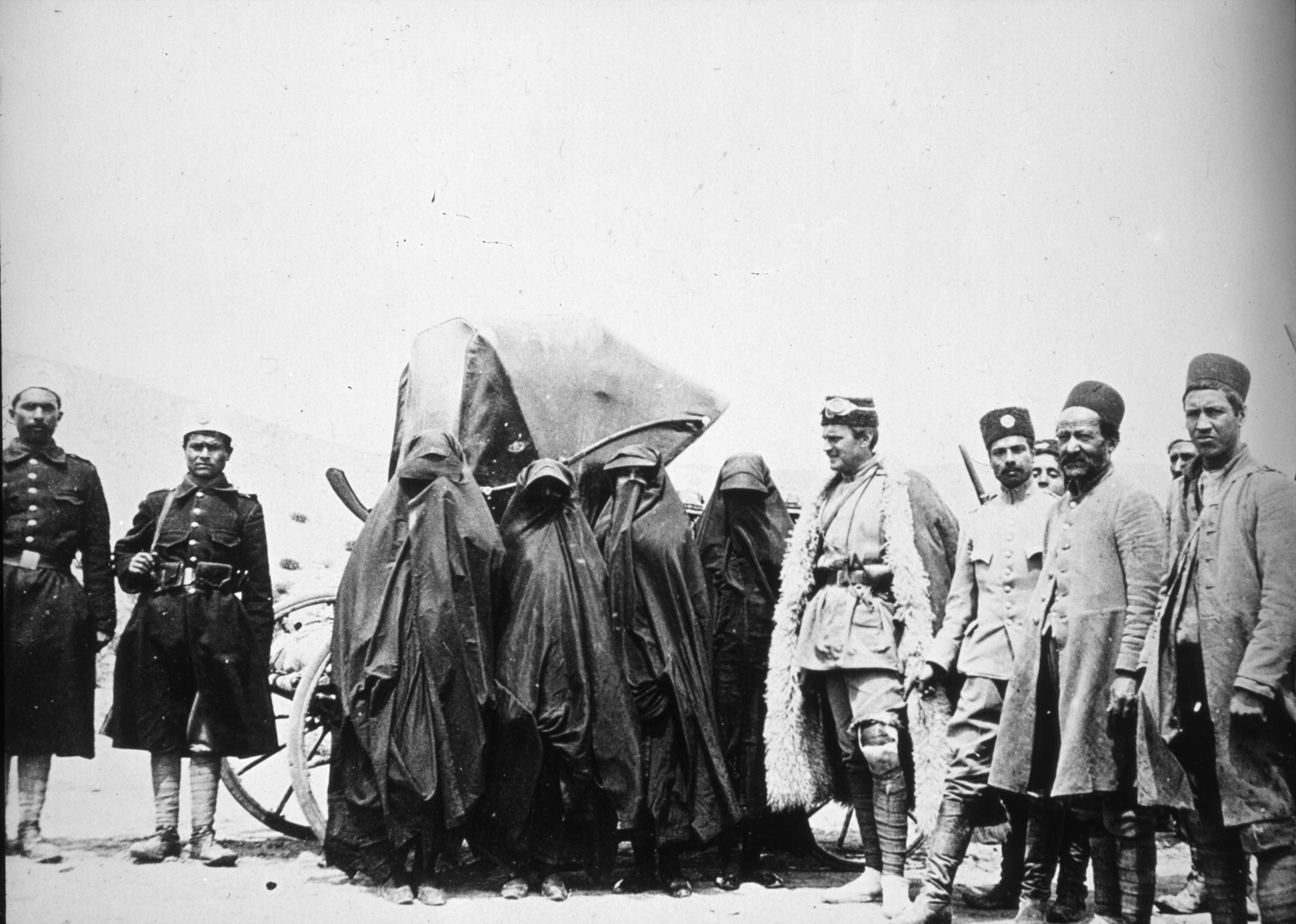
Boris Möller (the one to the right of the Muslim women) injured after an attack on his wagon

The United Kingdom and Russia decided to invade Persia in 1914 at the outbreak of World War I. The opinions of the Swedes reflected those popular back home, namely that they were pro-German. The Swedish officers decided to help the Persians and engaged in numerous battles with the Allies, including the Kermanshah operation, Battle of Qom, British occupation of Bushehr, and Battle of Robat Karim. In 1915 the Russians and British therefore pressured Sweden to call back their officers. The Swedish government complied and started steadily calling their deployed officers back until none remained in 1916. However, the hostilities with the Allies did not hamper the fight against the insurgents. Several Swedes and Persians died in combat with the insurgents between 1914 and 1916 in conflicts such as the Battle of Bouin and that of Qazvin when the gendarmes captured 8,000 sheep. The gendarmes also persecuted and captured all clan members of Abba Khan (who was shot by Boris Möller).

== Aftermath ==
After Sweden decided to call back their soldiers, five Swedes decided to stay serving as volunteers under German leadership, and the leadership of the Persian Gendarmerie continued to be Swedish until 1921. The Swedes in Persia greatly contributed to the modernization and the formation of the gendarmerie, although, the previously Swedish-led gendarmerie would cease to exist when it merged into the Shahrbani in 1992.

== See also ==
- Persian campaign (World War I)
- List of wars involving Sweden
- List of wars involving Iran
- List of wars involving the United Kingdom
- List of wars involving Russia
- Iranian Gendarmerie
- Harald Hjalmarson
- Shiraz expedition
- List of Swedish peacekeeping missions
- Austro-Hungarian military mission in Persia
