= Austro-Hungarian military mission in Persia =

1879–1881 military assistance mission

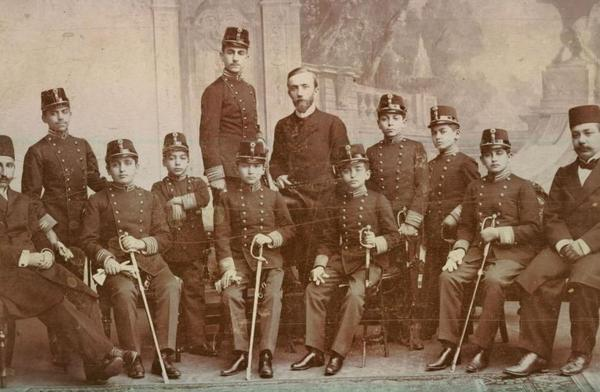
Iranian cadets of the Austrian military academy in Tehran, circa 1900

The Austro-Hungarian military mission in Persia was a military assistance mission sent by Austria-Hungary to Qajar Persia starting in 1879 to aid Naser al-Din Shah in his efforts to establish a standing army in Persia. The mission's objective was to create a modern corps-sized military force.

== Establishment ==
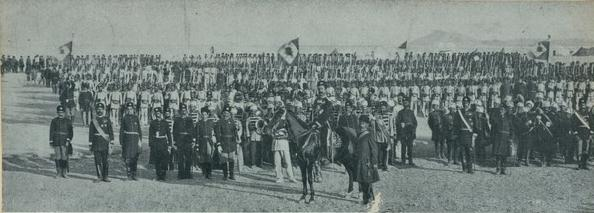
Parade of the Qajar Persian infantry, trained by the Austro-Hungarian mission

The Austro-Hungarian Army Corps mission was part of the modernization of Persian forces, implemented with the assistance of Austrian military experts. Due to the good relations of Naser al-Din Shah's first interpreter (Armenian Mirza Davood (David) Khan), the Austrian court in Vienna, and the connections of his former personal physician, Jakob Eduard Polak, Naser al-Din Shah recruited Austrian officers to reorganize the Persian army during his second trip to Europe.

The arrival of Naser al-Din Shah in Vienna on 5 July 1878 was organized like a festival. Johann Strauss II was commissioned by the Viennese court to compose a Persian national anthem to honor the royal guest. Naser al-Din Shah first visited the Viennese Arsenal to witness a demonstration of the guns developed by Major General Uchatius, the ordnance expert and master artillery specialist, member of the Viennese Academy of Sciences, Knight Commander and recipient of the Royal Hungarian Order of Saint Stephen. The Shah was apparently so impressed that he immediately ordered 12 guns. He also purchased 26,000 rifles and came to an agreement with the Austrian government for the deployment of a military mission to Persia.

Colonel Adalbert Schönowsky von Schönwies, serving as head of mission, departed with 30 other officers for Tehran on 29 October 1878. On 12 November 1878, the mission arrived in Tarnopol, where it was joined by retired military bandmaster Julius Gebauer, who had purchase instruments in Vienna for a Persian military band. Fourteen mission participants then traveled with 2.4 tons of luggage by train to Odessa, by ship to Poti, again by train to Tbilisi, from there to Baku and finally via the Caspian Sea to Rasht. The mission arrived in Tehran in January 1879. It was accompanied by Albert Joseph Gasteiger, who had already served in Persia several years.

The Austro-Hungarian mission's objective was to reorganize the Persian army on the model of the imperial Austrian army. First to be established was a corps of 7,000 men, including a military musical unit. Training of the soldiers was completed in March 1881. The Austrians were able to ensure that Persian soldiers of the Corps were better paid than other soldiers, and that their salary was paid regularly. Despite attacks by Persian clergy against those they perceived as infidels, the corps was created and an esprit de corps soon developed in the unit. On 22 May 1879, Naser al-Din Shah visited to take his first look at the corps set up by the mission. He listened to the Radetzky March, took in a parade and visited the barracks of Abd ol-Azim, which he had never seen in such pristine condition.

The high spirits of the Austrian officers were marred by the arrival in May 1879 of Russian officers to establish a Persian Cossack Brigade. Ultimately, the Cossack Brigade outdid the Austrians Corps and later formed the nucleus of the Imperial Iranian Army. Despite this, the Austro-Hungarian military mission was still considered successful. At the end of July 1879, the corps had 90 officers and 1,400 men. In January 1880, the head of mission and Schönowsky were dismissed by Colonel Schemel von Kühnritt, a former commander of the "Friedrich Leopold of Prussia" Hussars regiment No. 2. In May, the corps was composed of 2,000 men, equipped with Austrian uniforms and weapons. In April 1880, there were already 260 officers and 6,000 men serving in the Austrian Corps service.

Plans for the Persian army called for a corps with the total strength of 7,000 men, organized as follows:

- 6 infantry battalions, each with 800 men
- 1 battalion of 800 men with hunters
- 3 artillery batteries with 200 men
- 1 pioneers with 200 men
- 3 music bands with 50 men

== Operations ==
The first use of the "Austrian corps" occurred in October 1880. In Azerbaijan, a Kurdish uprising under the leadership of Sheikh Ubeydullah had taken place against the central government in Tehran. The commander of the detachment was Captain Wagner von Wetterstädt who was battle-tested, having already served in Mexico under Maximilian I. The uprising was crushed. Captain Wagner served with the artillery in Urmia to defend it against further attacks. The successes of the Austrian corps led to further plans. The entire army was to be equipped with Austrian uniforms and armed with new rifles and guns. But Naser al-Din Shah lacked the necessary funds. In May 1881, Corps payroll was reduced, and on 5 August 1881, all officer pay ceased, spelling the end of the Austrian corps' operations. By the autumn of 1881, the last officer of the military mission had returned to Austria.

Wagner von Wetterstädt also returned to Austria that year, retiring from the Austrian army as a Major in 1885. At the request of Naser al-Din Shah, he returned to Persia with the rank of general in the Persian army the following year, reorganizing the army and given the title of 'Khan'. As army commander, he led numerous missions and accompanied the Shah to the World Exhibition in Paris in 1889. He did not return to his native Transylvania until 1901, for health reasons, dying on 30 September 1902 in Hermannstadt.

== Unofficial missions ==
After lengthy negotiations, Naser al-Din Shah succeeded in recruiting officers to continue Austrian army reforms. This time they arrived "of their own accord" and were no longer part of an official military mission. As a tribute to the work done up to that point by the Austrians, in January 1882 the entire army, consisting of 10,000 men, was equipped with Austrian uniforms and 8,000 new rifles. In 1883 and again in 1888, several mountain guns and 20 heavy guns were added to the artillery units.

=== Military exchanges ===
In Bremerhaven, a six-gun warship was ordered and baptized "Persepolis". Naser al-Din Shah could control the Persian Gulf with it. The ship was to sail with a German team to the Persian Gulf.

A military academy was founded in Tehran in 1885; Austrian officers stationed in the Persian army taught there, in addition to their military duties. In 1886, Persian cadets were sent to Vienna for further studies and the following year Naser al-Din Shah asked Emperor Franz Josef for additional support of his military reforms. An Austrian general was to go to Persia, inspect the troops and lead an Austrian military mission with the rank of Persian Defense Minister. Franz-Josef refused, fearing problems with Russia. But he sent General von Thömmel as ambassador to Tehran. After a brief inspection of the situation, it became clear that there would be little return for the military support Austria was to provide. In addition, Persia was beginning to lose its strategic military importance. The first official Austrian military involvement in Persia ended.

Under Muzaffar al-Din Shah, Naser al-Din Shah's successor, Austrian officers were hired as instructors. On 7 August 1906, the shah met Captain Artur Kostersitz von Marenhorst and Major Conrad Emil Padowetz in Tehran. Padowetz left Tehran for two years and served as honorary consul in Geneva, Switzerland. Kostersitz, the last Austrian officer to serve in the Persian military, was head of the Military Academy until its closure in 1911. That year, the graduates went to the newly founded Persian Gendarmerie. Kostersitz remained in Tehran until shortly before World War I.

=== Recruitment in Persian Army ===
At this time, the Persian army was nominally made up of 72 infantry regiments, each with 600 men. Recruits came exclusively from rural areas, as city and town inhabitants were exempted from military service. According to the National Defence Act, each village was required to provide a certain number of soldiers. Conscription lasted between five and twenty years. However, army conscripts could leave after a few months of basic training by paying bribes to the regimental commander for an indefinite period. Those who could not afford to do so worked to earn an income, as soldiers received neither payment nor food. New uniforms were only issued every two to three years. Weapons were stored in arsenals and only issued during military exercises. Many soldiers had never fired a shot as target practice was rare. So-called military training took place no more than twice a week. Army officers were usually landowners, many of them holding military rank solely due to their social status; they often had no military or professional training, and most were illiterate. Some officers operated shops in bazaars to supplement their income.

Approximately 100 to 500 soldiers were stationed in each garrison. The Ministry of War sent inspectors to the garrisons twice a year to verify changes on soldier payroll lists. Each time an inspection was announced, those on the payroll lists were recalled at short notice. To replace any missing personnel on inspection day, laborers were hired, equipped with weapons and uniforms, and made to line up with the regular soldiers in the ranks. Inspectors usually confirmed the presence of all listed military personnel.

In addition to the infantry, there were 16 artillery units. These were equipped with 60 Uchatius heavy guns produced in Austria and 30 Schneider-Creusot quick-firing guns, although they were stored, save for a few guns, in the arsenal, serving little purpose. Some guns were loaned to the Gendarmerie. The artillery did not possess its own horses. If an artillery exercise in Tehran was scheduled, horses were borrowed from the horse-drawn carriage depot.

Given the conditions described by Hassan Arfa, the Persian army was ultimately not ready to fight. Even during conflicts between the central government and separatist movements in western and northern Iran after World War I, the army played no significant role. Defeat of the separatist movements came at the hands of the Persian Cossacks, led by Reza Khan. The Persian army remained unchanged, with only minor reforms in uniforms worn by some generals until after World War I and the yellow paint of the Persian army barracks, until its dissolution by the measures implemented by Reza Khan, later Reza Shah Pahlavi, in 1921.

Military bandmaster Julius Gebauer, the only remaining member of the initial 1879 Austro-Hungarian military mission, stayed in Tehran until his death. His grave in the city's Doulab Cemetery reads "Here lies Julius Gebauer, general and musical director, born 18 March 1846, died on 9 July 1895."

== See also ==
- Persian Cossack Brigade
- Swedish intervention in Persia

== Notes ==
1. The anthem is now listed under the title "Persian March"
2. Reinhard Pohanka, Ingrid Thurner: The Khan of Tyrol. Vienna, 1988, p. 82
3. Helmut Slaby: shield lion and sun. Academic Printing and Publishing House, 1982, 153
4. Hassan Arfa: Under Five Shahs. London, 1964, pp. 50f
5. Helmut Slaby: shield lion and sun. Academic Printing and Publishing House, 1982, pp. 182
