= Mohammad Sohrabi =

Iranian Military Officer (1940)

Timsar Mohammad Sohrabi
- محمد سهرابی

Chief of the Iranian Police
- In office 1 April 1991 – 24 September 1992
- Appointed by: Ali Khamenei
- President: Akbar Hashemi Rafsanjani
- Supreme Leader: Ali Khamenei
- Preceded by: Office Established
- Succeeded by: Reza Seifollahi

Chief of the Gendarmerie of the Islamic Republic of Iran
- In office 9 February 1985 – 1 April 1991
- Appointed by: Ruhollah Khomeini
- President: Ali Khamenei; Akbar Hashemi Rafsanjani
- Prime Minister: Mir-Hossein Mousavi
- Supreme Leader: Ruhollah Khomeini; Ali Khamenei
- Preceded by: Colonel Rafiei Basiri
- Succeeded by: Office Abolished

President of the Motorcycle & Automobile Federation of Iran
- In office 1989–?
- Preceded by: ?
- Succeeded by: Moharram Faryad Shiran

Personal details
- Born: 1940 (age 85–86) Tabas, Khorasan, Iran
- Education: Officers' Academy

Military service
- Allegiance: Pahlavi Iran (1962–1979); Iran (1979–1992)
- Branch/service: Gendarmerie
- Years of service: 1962–1992
- Rank: Brigadier General
- Commands: Gendarmerie in Gilan province (1978–1979)
- Battles/wars: Iran–Iraq War

Mohammad Sohrabi (Persian: محمد سهرابی) is an Iranian retired gendarme who held office as the last chief of the Iranian Gendarmerie from 1985 to 1991. He also served as the first chief of the unified Law Enforcement Force from 1991 to 1992.

== Early life and education ==
Sohrabi was born in 1940, in Tabas. He was graduated from the military academy of Imperial Iranian Army.

== Career ==
Following the Iranian Revolution, Sohrabi was appointed the chief of gendarmerie forces of Gilan province in February 1979. On 9 February 1985, he became the national chief of gendarmerie. He was promoted to the rank of brigadier general in 1987. Sohrabi continued to serve in the capacity until 1 April 1991, when the forces were formally merged into the Law Enforcement Force, the unified police force in the country. He was responsible for supervising the merger process involving Shahrbani and Revolutionary Committees in addition to his own service, and was subsequently appointed the chief of the newly-formed police forces. Sohrabi was replaced on 24 September 1992 and became retired.

Police appointments
New title Office created	Commander of the Law Enforcement Force; 1 April 1991–24 September 1992	Succeeded by Reza Seifollahi
Preceded by Rafiei Basiri	Commander of the Gendarmerie; 9 February 1985–1 April 1991	Vacant Office abolished
Preceded by ?	Commander of the Gendarmerie in Gilan province 1978–1979	Succeeded by Manouchehr Golbang
Sporting positions
Preceded by ?	President of the Motorcycle & Automobile Federation of Iran; 1989–?	Succeeded by Moharram Faryad Shiran
