= Kochergin =

Kochergin or Kocherhin (Russian: Кочергин, from кочерга meaning fire iron) is a Russian masculine surname, its feminine counterpart is Kochergina or Kocherhina. It may refer to

- Evgeny Kochergin (born 1945), Russian speaker and presenter
- Ivan Kochergin (1935–2015), Russian wrestler
- Tetyana Kocherhina (born 1956), Ukrainian handball player
