= Harald Hjalmarson =

Swedish soldier who volunteered for the Finnish Civil War

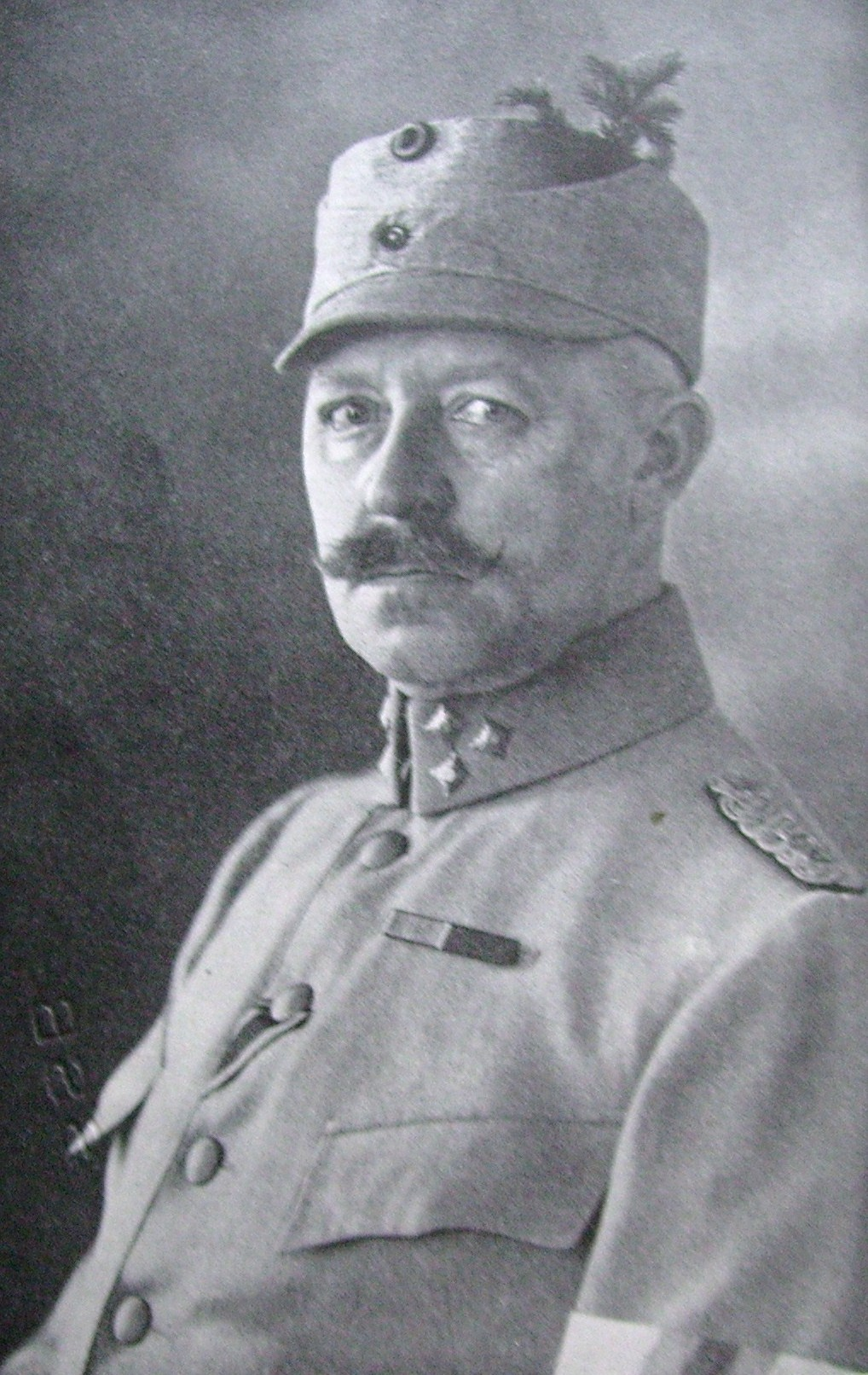
- Harald Hjalmarson in 1919
- Born: 14 July 1868; Stockholm, Sweden-Norway
- Died: 16 December 1919 (aged 51); Uppsala, Sweden
- Cause of death: Suicide by gunshot
- Military career
- Allegiance: Sweden-Norway; Sweden; Qajar Iran; Finland
- Branch: Swedish Army; Iranian Gendarmerie; Finnish Army
- Service years: 1889–1919
- Rank: Lieutenant Colonel (Sweden); General (Persia); Major General (Finland)
- Commands: Chief of the Persian Gendarmerie (1911–15); Chief of the Swedish Brigade (1918)
- Conflicts: First World War; Persian campaign; Finnish Civil War

Harald Ossian Hjalmarson (14 July 1868 – 15 December 1919) was a Swedish military officer and mercenary. During the First World War, he fought on the side of Qajar Iran in the Persian campaign, serving in the Iranian Gendarmerie. Following the end of the First World War, Hjalmarson went to Finland and joined the White Guard during the Finnish Civil War, serving as the commander of the Crenatorial Division. His actions during the Finnish Civil War were unsatisfactory, and he was unpopular among the ranks.

== Biography ==
=== Career before the Finnish Civil War ===
Hjalmarson's father, Major Hjalmar Andersson, had volunteered for the American Civil War. He was also the grandson of the theater director Oscar Andersson. Hjalmarson began his military career by enlisting in the North Scanian Infantry Regiment in 1887. He graduated as an officer in 1889, attended the Royal Swedish Army Staff College from 1892 to 1894, was a candidate in the Swedish General Staff for some time in 1895, and then served as a lieutenant in his old regiment. In 1905 he was promoted to captain. However, he did not find positions in the Swedish Army that matched his ambition and therefore sought to join the French Army and spent a year in Russia. He was a locomotive driver on the Swedish State Railways for up to a year. From 1911 he was colonel and commander of the Persian Gendarmerie. In his memoirs he shares the attitude to war participation:

is in the light of this forgetfulness of our noblest duty of duty and against the background of the heart's inviting imperative for a people who have not forgotten their antiquity, that one has to see individual Swedes' voluntary participation in Finland's freedom struggle. It was an expression of burning resentment against the indifference of official Sweden, and even more so against the mighty hands, which put obstacles in the way of those who really wanted to help in a struggle that should have been everyone's, but became only a few.

=== Finnish Civil War ===
In February 1918, Hjalmarson, along with some other Swedish officers, resigned from the Swedish army to volunteer for the Finnish White Forces, as the Swedish government did not want to send official Swedish troops to take part in the Finnish Civil War. About thirty Swedish active officers and fifty reserve officers went to Finland. Upon arriving in Vaasa, Hjalmarson was immediately recruited as a colonel in the Finnish White Army, and he was tasked with leading a 650-man special unit, which was to proceed through the red lines and go to help the embargoed Eastern Uusimaa protection municipalities. However, the attempt failed, as the Uusimaa whites had already dispersed and Hjalmarson's men were beaten back in the Battle of Heinola at the end of February.

On 6 March an army group known as the Hjalmarson Group was formed under Hjalmarson, one of the four white groups to participate in the siege and conquest of the city of Tampere . The group was to proceed from Virrat via Kuru to Orivesi and thus besiege the reds on the Battle of Vilppula. Due to the inexperience of his troops and the red counterattack, Hjalmarson was set off late on schedule. He won the Battle of Kuru on 15–17 March, but the siege of the Reds failed, as they withdrew from the front overnight and, unaware of the success of other army groups in Hjalmarson, did not embark on an effective pursuit. As a result, White Headquarters and General Mannerheim completely lost confidence in him. After the Battle of Kuru, Hjalmarson shot at least four Red Guards who had been taken prisoner, such as Matti Kuljun, a company manager from Tampere.

After the battle at Kuru, Hjalmarson's troops marched across the ice of Lake Näsijärvi from Teisko and went to help the Satakunta group commanded by Ernst Linder. They took part in the end of the Battle of Tampere by occupying Viljakkala on 23 March and biting into on 26 March in the west edge of Epilään, where they remained until the surrender of the city. After the battle of Tampere, Hjalmarson took command of the Lempäälä front and the Swedish Brigade, but the focus of the war had already shifted elsewhere. When the Reds seceded from the Lempäälä front on 25 April, Hjalmarson again chased late. He still led the Swedish Volunteer Brigade at the White Victory Parade in Helsinki on 16 May. Despite his wishes, Hjalmarson did not get a permanent post in the Finnish army, as the Swedes were ousted from the German path as early as June 1918. However, in connection with his resignation, he received the rank of Major General in the Finnish Armed Forces.

=== Later life ===
Hjalmarson returned to the Swedish Army in January 1919, where he had to settle for his old rank of lieutenant colonel. Hjalmarson was accused in the wake of the Finnish Civil War of both his inability as commander and the murder of prisoners of war, so to clean up his reputation he wrote a memoir titled Mina krigsminnen från Finland: ur en svensk-frivilligs dagboksanteckningar från fälttåget 1918 in Finland. Hjalmarson had suffered from a chronic illness since his Persian years and had to use strong medication. He then committed suicide in Uppsala in December 1919.

Jarl Hjalmarson, a politician who chaired the Swedish Moderate Party, was the son of Harald Hjalmarson.

== Awards ==
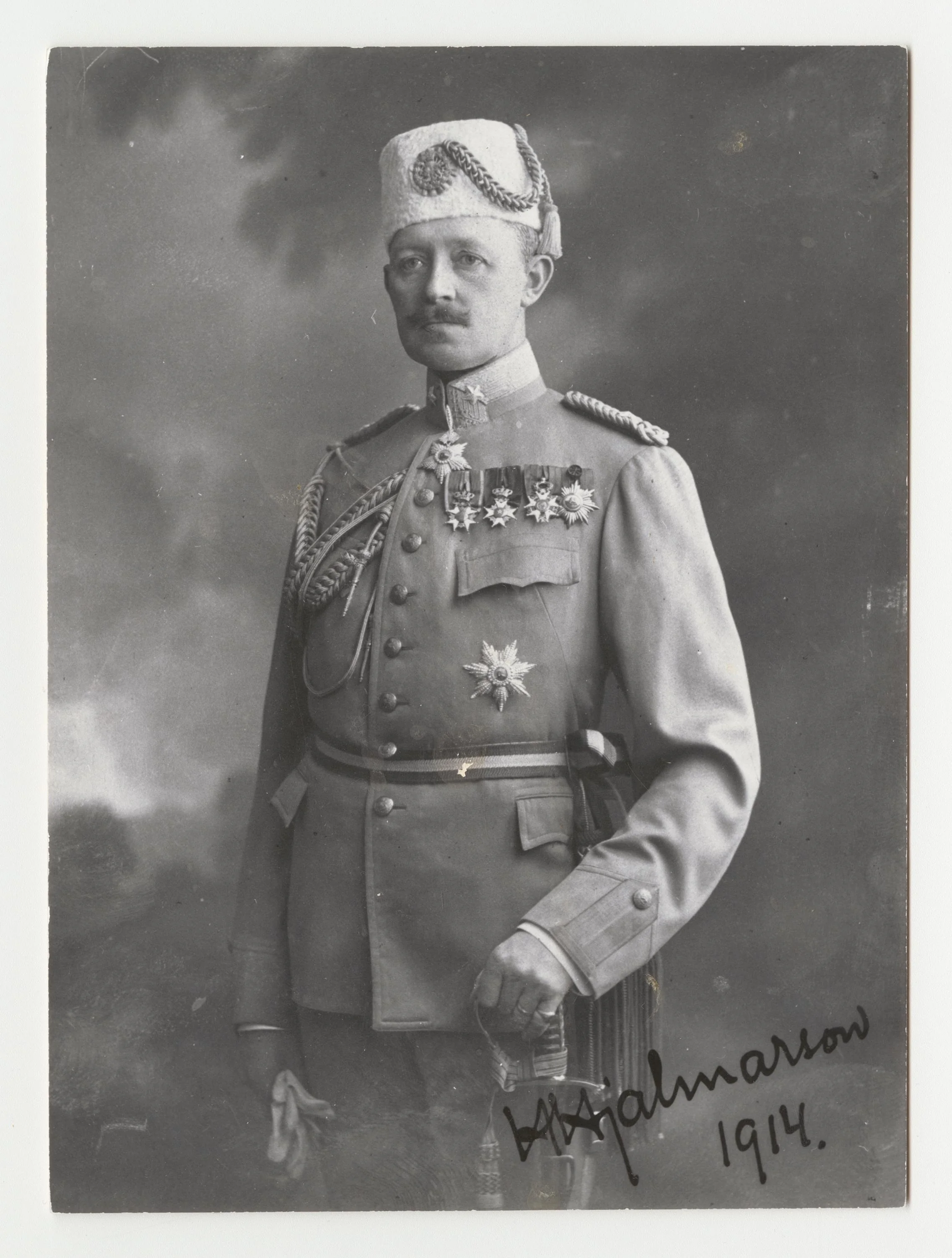
General Harald O. Hjalmarson in Persia, 1914.

- China: Order of the Golden Harvest, earliest 1915 and latest 1918
- France: Legion of Honour, Knight, 1908
- Persia: Order of the Lion and the Sun, Second Class, earliest 1910 and latest 1915
- Persia: Persian Officer of Public Instruction
- Sweden: Order of the Sword, Knight of the First Class, 1910
- Sweden: Order of the Polar Star, Knight, 1914

== See also ==
- Swedish intervention in Persia
- Finnish Civil War

== Bibliography ==
- Harald Hjalmarson
- Uppsala universitetsbibliotek, 3 vol.
