= Persischer Marsch =

1864 composition by Johann Strauss II

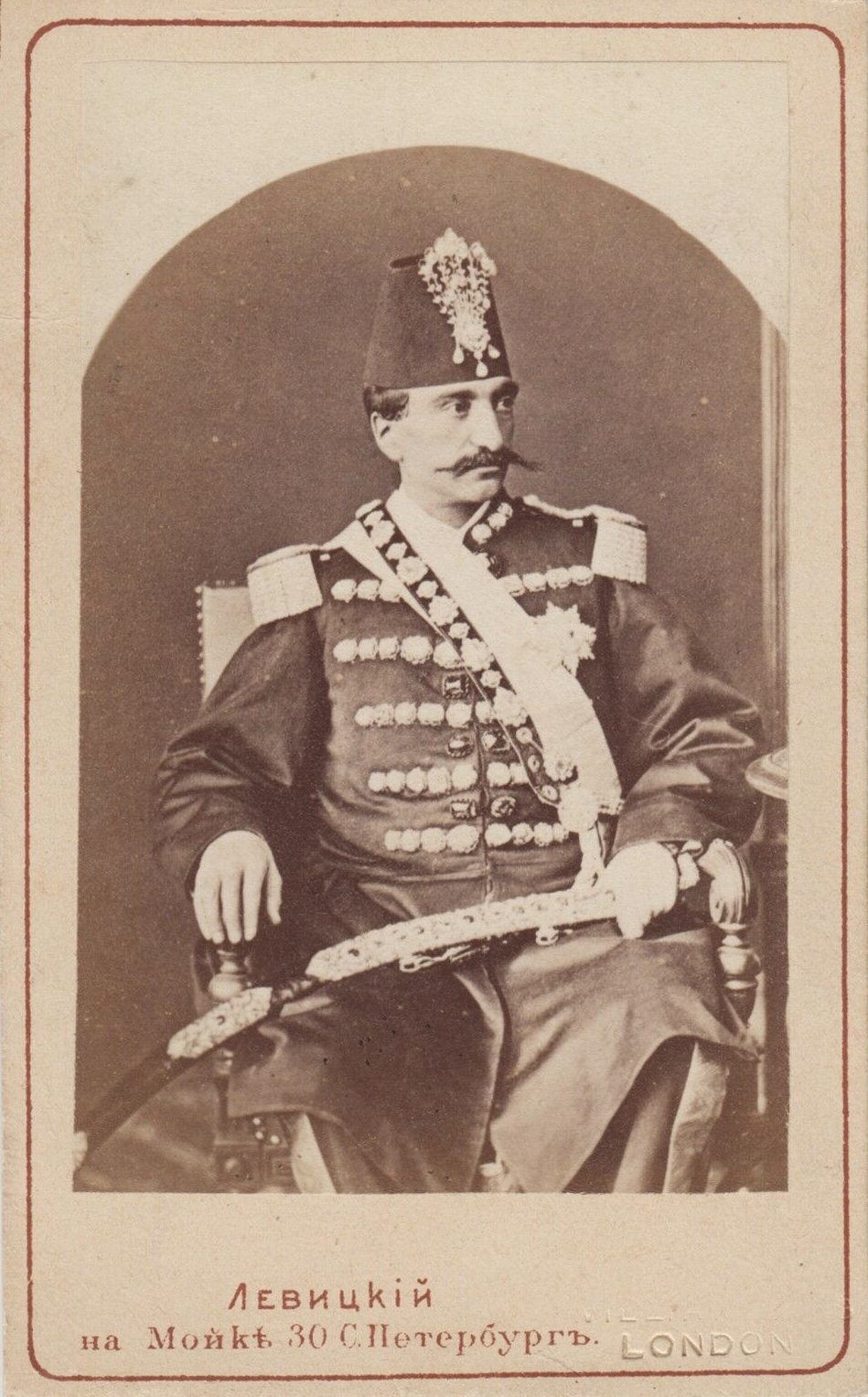
Naser Din Shah, to which the march was dedicated

"Persischer Marsch" ("Persian March"), Op. 289, is a march in G minor composed by Johann Strauss II in the autumn of 1864. The composer conducted the first Viennese performance of the march in December 1864 at a festival concert in the Volksgarten, Vienna, to celebrate the 20th anniversary of his debut as a composer. When Naser al-Din Shah Qajar, to whom Strauss had dedicated the march, visited Vienna for the 1873 Vienna World's Fair, a military band, unable to acquire the music for the authentic Persian anthem, instead played this march as a hymn for the Shah.
