= Iranian Gendarmerie =

Former Iranian police force

- Seal of the Islamic Republic of Iran Gendarmerie

- Seal of the Imperial Iranian Gendarmerie

Agency overview
- Formed: 1910
- Dissolved: 1991
- Superseding agency: Police Command of the Islamic Republic of Iran
- Employees: ~70,000 (1978–79)

Jurisdictional structure
- National agency: Iran
- Operations jurisdiction: Iran
- General nature: Gendarmerie

The Iranian Gendarmerie (Persian: ژاندارمری ایران), also known as the Government Gendarmerie (Persian: ژاندارمری دولتی, romanized: Žāndārmirī-ye Daulatī), was the gendarmerie, and subsequent modern highway patrol, in Iran. A paramilitary force, it also played a significant part in politics from its establishment in 1910 during the Qajar era until the advent of the Pahlavi era in 1925. It continued to serve until the end of the Pahlavi era and was modernized into the Imperial Iranian Gendarmerie. Originally established as a constitutional army, the force employed Swedish officers in command of Iranian personnel to perform both traditional police duties and conduct military campaigns against tribal forces. In 1991 the Iranian Gendarmerie was merged with other police forces to form the Police Command of the Islamic Republic of Iran.

== History ==
Iranian Central Government Gendarmerie Jhāndārmeri-ye Dowlati
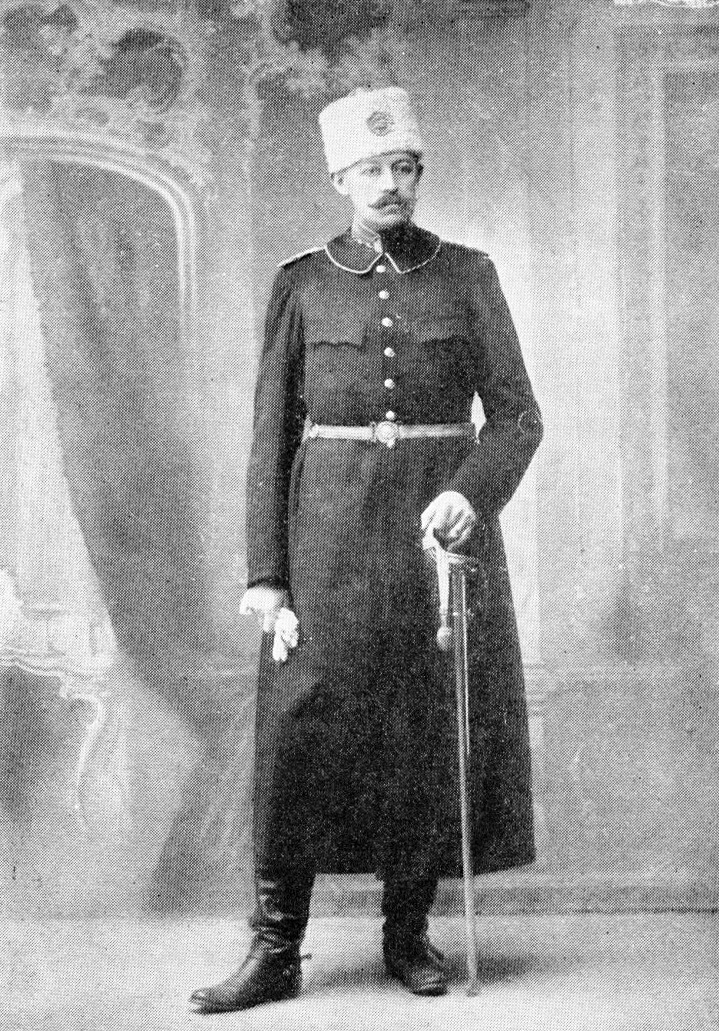
- General Harald Hjalmarson in Iran, 1911
- Active: 1910–1920
- Country: Qajar Iran
- Allegiance: Shah of Iran
- Size: 7,200
- Garrison/HQ: Shiraz, Kazerun, Borujerd, Soltanabad
- Patron: Ahmad Shah Qajar
- Colors: light blue, grey and gold
- Engagements: World War I

Commanders
- General: Harald Hjalmarson
- Officer: Eric Carlberg
- Colonel of the Regiment: Mohammad Taqi Pessian
- Notable commanders: Jarl Hjalmarson

Throughout the nineteenth century military modernisation was a constant preoccupation of Iranian reformers and the history of the Qajar era is peppered with attempts to create a standing army on the European model. In an attempt to develop sufficient military strength to defend itself against its external enemies, the Iranians chose Sweden to be given the task to secure their trade routes and unify the country. The Iranians chose the Swedish police force as a neutral choice between Britain and Russia. Due to European nations running much of Iranian services, many Iranians believed that their rulers were beholden to foreign interests.

Due to a lack of reform to Iranian Government services during the Qajar era in the late 19th century, Iranian military and police had insufficient modernisation. The American Treasurer-General, William Morgan Shuster proposed the creation of a Treasury Gendarmerie. The proposal was passed by the Majlis on 6 July 1911, along with the launching of the Government Gendarmerie. On 15 August 1911, the Swedish Major Harald Hjalmarson was given the rank of General and put in command of the Iranian Gendarmerie. Many other officers, often recruited from the Swedish nobility, would come to follow in Hjalmarson's footsteps.

During the Persian Campaign of the First World War, the officers of the Swedish Gendarmerie, who, like most of the Iranian intelligentsia and constitutionalists, were sympathetic towards Germany, helped the Central Powers. At one point in autumn 1915, they seized control of Shiraz with the connivance of the German-trained provincial governor Mehdi-Qoli Mokhber'ol Saltaneh Hedayat. After the 1921 coup d'état, the War Minister Reza Khan merged the two viable military forces which existed in Iran at that point, i.e. the Cossack division and the Gendarmerie, to create the modern Iranian national army. A rural police, amnieh, was created and the nazmieh or the police force was also revamped and placed under Iranian officers.

The disbanding of the Swedish Gendarmerie would greatly weaken the Qajar monarchy and with the Persian Cossack Brigade being the only remaining army unit, it greatly facilitated Reza Shah’s coup in 1921. Hjalmarson would return to Sweden and take command of the volunteer Swedish Brigade serving on the White side in the Finnish Civil War. Another officer, Eric Carlberg, later become Sweden’s ambassador to Iran, and a confidant of Mohammed Mosaddeq.

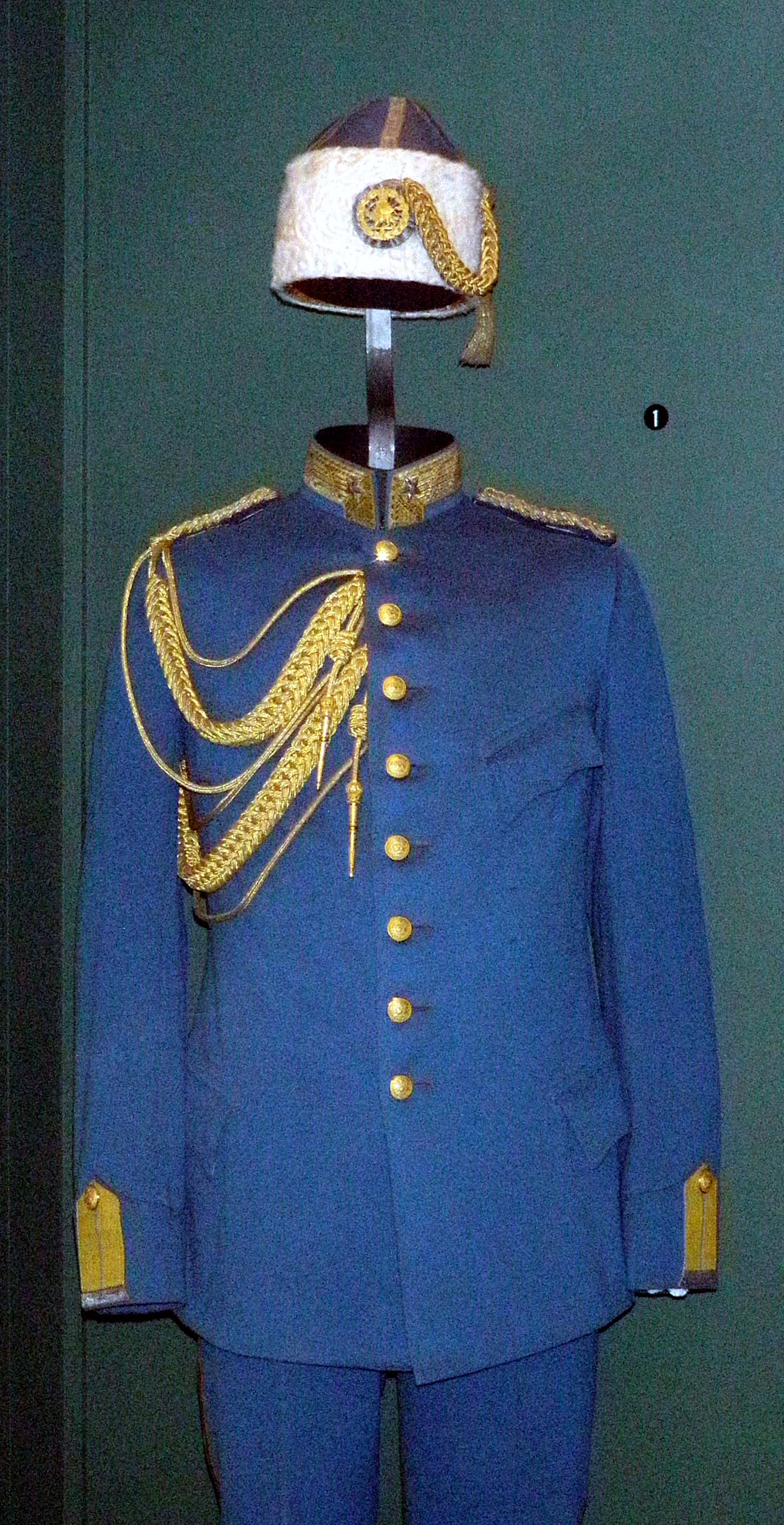
General Harald Hjalmarson's uniform on display at the Swedish Army Museum

=== Post Revolution ===
Following the overthrow of the Shah in 1979 the Imperial Iranian Gendarmerie remained in existence, although with charges of title, insignia and senior officers. In 1992 it was merged with the Shahrbani and the Islamic Revolution Committees into a single national law enforcement force, the Police Command of the Islamic Republic of Iran.

== Organisation ==
The Gendarmerie's purpose was to guard the frontiers and the interior. It consisted of a number of battalions, each of 4 to 6 companies. For discipline and administrative purposes, the corps was under the supervision of the general officer commanding the division in whose area it was stationed. For police administration work, it came under local civil authorities. The force was armed with old pattern rifles of various makes plus some Soviet, French and British carbines, but not many modern. It consisted of a total of 7 Independent Mixed Regiments and 15 Mixed Battalions, forming a Corps.

=== Stations ===
Major

- Tehran

Minor

- Shiraz
- Kerman
- Qazvin
- Isfahan
- Boroujerd

== Commanders ==
Reign of Ahmad Shah Qajar

- Harald Hjalmarson (August 1911 – February 1915)
- Per Nyström (March 1915 – end of 1916)
- Gustav Edwall (1916 – 1918)
- Tage Fredrik Gleerup (August 1918 – end of 1921)
- Sardar Rifat (1921–1925)

Reign of Reza Shah

- Ahmad Amir-Ahmadi (March 1925 – May 1929)
- Ali Tofiqi (July 1926 – October 1926) (Acting)
- Fazlollah Zahedi (May 1929 – mid-June 1929)
- Morteza Yazdanpanah (mid-June 1929 – April 1930)
- Azizollah Zarghami (April 1930 – August 1934)
- Gholam-Ali Zand (August 1934 – December 1936)
- Abdul Majid Firuz (December 1936 – December 1937)
- Mahmoud Khosropanah (December 1937 – March 1939)

Reign of Mohammad Reza Shah

- Fazlollah Zahedi (September 1941 – December 1941)
- Farajollah Aqawli (December 1941 – December 1943)
- Hosseingholi Satoti (December 1943 – June 1944)
- Mahmoud Khosropanah (June 1944 – 1945)
- Mohammad Hossein Jahanbani (1945 – February 1946)
- Ahmad Qavam (February 1946 – March 1947)
- Mahmoud Khosropanah (March 1947 – January 1948)
- Mohammad Sadeq Kopal (January 1948 – July 1950)
- Aligholi Golpira (July 1950 – 1951)
- Mehdi Qoli Alavi Moghadam (1951 – 1952)
- Ahmad Wosouq (1952 – 1953)
- Mohammad Sadeq Kopal (1953 – ?)
- Mohammad Ali Alavi Moghadam (?)
- Mahmoud Amini (?)
- Aligholi Golpira (?)
- Sadegh Amirazizi (1958 – 1961)
- Mohammad Hossein Zargham (1961 – 1969)
- Gholam Ali Oveissi (1969 – 1972)
- Mohammad Moazzi (1972 – ?)
- Fereydoun Farrokhnia (? – 3 May 1978)
- Abbas Gharabaghi (3 May 1978 – 26 August 1978)
- Ahmadali Mohagheghi (26 August 1978 – 11 February 1979)

Reign of the Islamic Republic of Iran

- Ahmadali Mohagheghi (12 February 1979 – 14 February 1979)
- Ezatollah Mumtaz (14 February 1979 – 5 May 1979)
- Elias Daneshvar (5 May 1979 – 16 March 1980)
- Qasem-Ali Zahirnejad (16 March 1980 – September 1980)
- Hassanali Forouzan (September 1980 – June 1981)
- Manouchehr Najafdari ( June 1981 – 20 February 1982)
- Ali Kouchakzadeh (20 February 1982 – ?)
- Colonel Sina (Acting)
- Colonel Fallahi (Acting)
- Colonel Rafiei Basiri (Acting)
- Mohammad Sohrabi (9 February 1985 – 1 April 1991)

== Notable officers ==
- An officer of the Gendarmerie was the last person who in 1915 was awarded the Swedish medal for bravery upon the field of battle "För tapperhet i fält".
- Eric Carlberg
- Martin Ekström
- Carl Petersén
- Mohammad Taqi Pessian
- Hasan Arfa
- Abolqasem Lahouti
- Mahmud Khan Puladeen

== See also ==
- Shahrbani
- Persian Cossack Brigade
- Austro-Hungarian military mission in Persia
- Swedish intervention in Persia

== Sources and further reading ==
English

- Fazlhashemi, Mohammad (2006). SWEDEN ii. SWEDISH OFFICERS IN PERSIA, 1911-15.
- Cronin, Stephanie (15 December 2000). Gendarmerie. Encyclopaedia Iranica.
- Cronin, Stephanie (1996). "An experiment in military modernization: constitutionalism, political reform and the Iranian Gendarmerie, 1910–21". Middle Eastern Studies. 32 (3): 106–138. doi:10.1080/00263209608701121.
- The Times; "Policing Persia–The Work of the Swedish Gendarmerie", 27 December 1913
- The Army and the Creation of the Pahlavi State in Iran 1910-1926, by Stephanie Cronin

Swedish

- Carlberg, Eric; "På uppdrag i Persien. Glimtar från en trettioårig vistelse under solens och lejonets tecken" Stockholm; Natur & Kultur, 1962.
