= Nikolai Baratov =

Russian general (1865–1932)

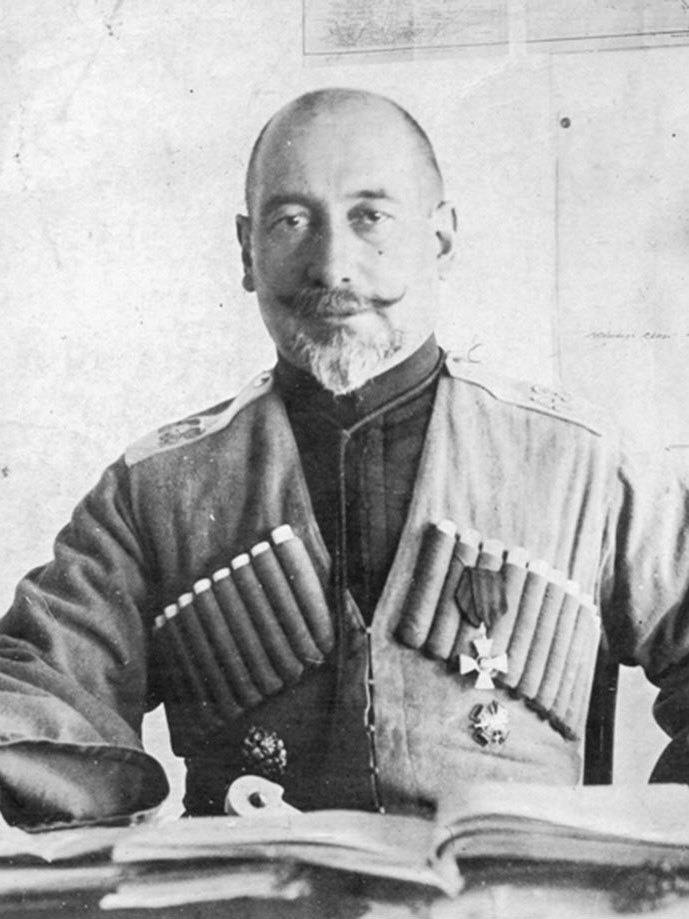
- Born: February 1, 1865; Vladikavkaz, Terek Oblast, Russian Empire
- Died: March 22, 1932 (aged 67); Paris, France
- Military career
- Allegiance: Russia
- Branch: Russian Imperial Army
- Service years: 1882–1919
- Rank: General of the cavalry
- Conflicts: Russo Japanese War; World War I Russian Civil War
- Awards: Order of St. Stanislav; Order of St. George; Order of St. Vladimir; Legion of Honour; Order of St. Anne

Nikolai Nikolaevich Baratov (Russian: Никола́й Никола́евич Бара́тов; February 1, 1865 – March 22, 1932) was a Russian general during World War I and the Russian Civil War.

== Early career ==
Baratov was born in Vladikavkaz, in the Terek Oblast of the Russian Empire. Although of ethnic Georgian descent (his real name was Baratashvili), he was also an ataman of the Terek Cossacks. He entered the military in 1882, and graduated from the Konstantinovskoe Artillery School and the Saint Petersburg Military Engineering-Technical University (Nikolaevsky) in 1885. He was assigned to the 1st Sunzha-Vladikavkaz Regiment of the Terek Cossack Army and was promoted to sotnik in December of the same year.

In 1891 he graduated from the Nikolaev General Staff Academy with the rank of captain, and was assigned to serve in the Caucasus Military District. He commanded a squadron of dragoons from 1893 to 1894, and was assigned to the Stavropol Cossack Cadet School as an instructor from 1895 to 1897. He was promoted to colonel in the cavalry in July 1900. On March 29, 1901, he was made commander of the 1st Sunzha-Vladikavkaz Regiment, and was awarded the Gold Sword of the Order of St. Anne for his actions in battle during the Russo-Japanese War. He became chief of staff of the Consolidated Cavalry Corps from August 1905 to March 1906, when he was promoted to major general. From July 1907, he served as Chief of Staff of the 2nd Caucasus Army Corps, and was promoted to lieutenant general on November 26, 1912.

== First World War ==
After the outbreak of World War I, he headed the 1st Caucasus Cossack Corps on the Caucasus Front and was prominent at the Battle of Sarikamish. During the Persian Campaign Baratov was successful in defeating Kerim Pasha's rear troops on August 5, 1915, after the Battle of Kara Killisse. His task was to counter the pro-German forces in Persia (headed by Georg von Kanitz), and to link Russian forces with the British expeditionary forces in Persia. In October 1915, he landed at Bandar-e Anzali and by December 3, 1915, took the ancient Persian capital of Hamadan. With the occupation of Qom and Kermanshah, the Russian forces under Baratov effectively isolated Persia from Ottoman Turkey, thus securing Persia for the Entente Powers. Baratov was decorated with the Order of St. George of the Fourth degree in October, 1916. After returning to Russia on March 24, 1917, he commanded the Caucasus Military District. On May 25, 1917, was appointed commander of the 5th Caucasus Army Corps. However, after the British defeat at the Siege of Kut, the Turks launched a massive offensive, forcing Baratov to return to Persia. He was made a general of cavalry on September 8, 1917.

== Russian Civil War ==
After the October Revolution of 1917, Baratov disbanded his corps and lived in exile in British India for five months. During the Russian Civil War, he joined the White movement. In June 1919, General Denikin, leader of the anti-Soviet Volunteer Army and the Armed Forces of South Russia, sent Baratov to settle uneasy relations with Democratic Republic of Georgia, with the promise of security to Georgia's northern borders in reward for free passage of White Movement forces through Georgia. On September 13, 1919, Baratov was heavily wounded in a terrorist incident in Tiflis, resulting in the amputation of his leg. From March to April 1920 Baratov served as the Minister of Foreign Affairs of the South Russian government. After the final defeat of the White Movement in November 1920, he lived in exile in France, where he headed various Russian emigre organizations, notably the Union of Disabled Persons and the Overseas Union of Russian people with disabilities. He was buried at the Sainte-Geneviève-des-Bois Russian Cemetery, near Paris.

== Awards ==
- Order of St. Stanislav Grade 3, (1893)
- Order of St. Anna Grade 3 (1895)
- Order of St. Stanislav Grade 2(1899)
- Order of St. Anne Grade 2 degree (1904)
- The golden gun "for courage" (1905)
- Swords of the Order of St. Anne Grade 2 (1906)
- Order of St. Vladimir Grade 4, with swords and bow (1906)
- Order of St. Vladimir Grade 3 (6 December 1909)
- Order of St. Stanislav Grade 1 (6 December 1912)
- Order of St. George Grade 4 (15 October 1916) - for the successful operation in July 1915 in the Agridag mountain range .
- Grand Croix of the Légion d'honneur (1916)
