= Persian campaign (World War I) =

Campaign in the Middle East during World War I

- Part of the Middle Eastern theatre of World War I and the Russo-Turkish Wars
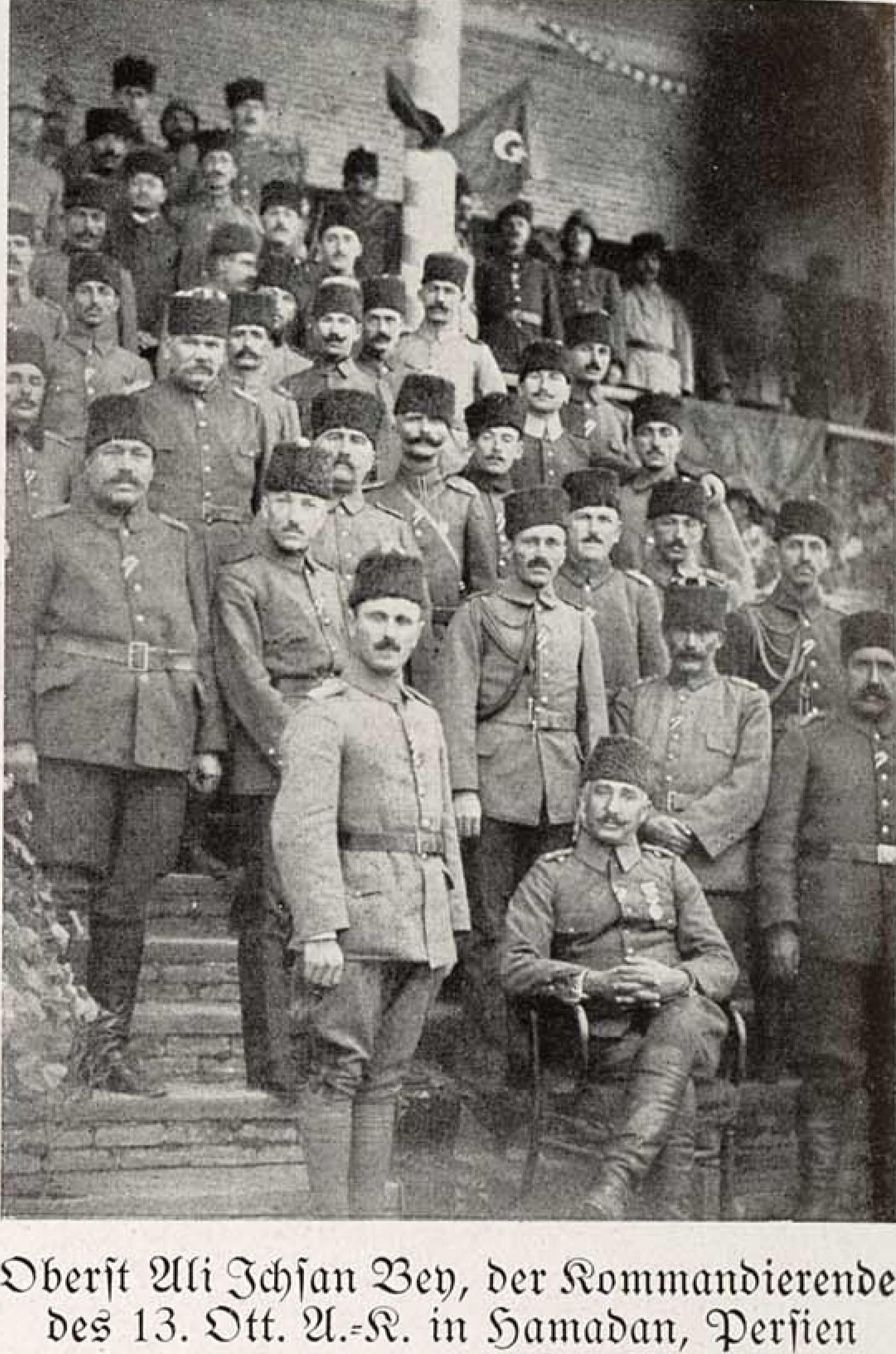
- The commander of the XIII Corps Ali İhsan Bey and his men in Hamadan
Date	December 1914 – 30 October 1918
Location	Persia
Result	Allied victory: British control of Persia; Armistice of Mudros; Ottoman forces withdraw from Persia

Belligerents
Allied Powers: Russia (1914–1917); Armenian Volunteers; British Empire; Assyrian volunteers	Central Powers: Ottoman Empire; (Simko Shikak) Kurdish forces; German Empire	Qajar Iran; Qashqai Tribesmen; Feyli Tribesmen; Lorestani Tribesmen; Tabarestani Tribesmen; Tangistani Tribesmen; Laristani Tribesmen; (Sweden) Swedish volunteers (from 1916); Sweden (until 1916)

Commanders and leaders
(Russian Empire) Tsar Nicholas II; (Russian Empire) Nikolai Baratov; (Russian Empire) Fyodor Chernozubov; Tovmas Nazarbekian; Andranik Ozanian; (United Kingdom of Great Britain and Ireland) H.H. Asquith; (United Kingdom of Great Britain and Ireland) David Lloyd George; (United Kingdom of Great Britain and Ireland) Percy Sykes; (United Kingdom of Great Britain and Ireland) Lionel Dunsterville; Agha Petros; Malik Khoshaba; Dawid Mar Shimun; Malik Yaqo; Shimun XIX Benyamin X; Reza Khan	(Ottoman Empire) Mehmed V; (Ottoman Empire) Enver Pasha; (Ottoman Empire) Halil Kut; (Ottoman Empire) Ali Ihsan Pasha; (Ottoman Empire) Kâzım (Karabekir) Bey; (Ottoman Empire) Nazif (Kayacık) Bey; (German Empire) Kaiser Wilhelm II; (German Empire) Georg von Kaunitz; (German Empire) Wilhelm Wassmuss; (German Empire) Arthur Bopp; Simko Shikak	Ahmad Shah Qajar; Hassan Mirza; Mohammad Taqi Pessian; Reza Khan; Hossein Qoli Khan Feyli; Ibrahim Khan Qavam-ul-Mulk; Heydar Latifiyan †; (Sweden) Harald Hjalmarson; (Sweden) Per Nyström

Units involved
Russian Caucasus Army; Armenian Volunteers; Assyrian volunteers; Royal Persian Cossack Brigade; Dunsterforce; South Persia Rifles; Khamseh Tribesmen	6th Army; XIII Corps; XVIII Corps; 3nd Army; IX Corps; Islamic Army of the Caucasus; Shekak Militants; German Military Detachment	Persian Gendarmerie; Qashqai Militants; Feyli Elamite Forces; Tabarestani Forces; Laristani Militants; Dashti Volunteers

Strength
Total: (United Kingdom of Great Britain and Ireland) 51,000; June 1916: (Russian Empire) ~20,000; Peak: (Russian Empire) 80,000 – 90,000	Total: (Ottoman Empire) ~1,000 – 5,000; June 1916: (Ottoman Empire) 25,000	Unknown

Casualties and losses
(British Empire) 3,000; 2,474+ killed 471+ wounded (Russian Empire) Unknown	(Ottoman Empire) 11,029; 9,353 killed few thousand died of disease	2,000,000 civilian deaths (due to war related famine and disease)

The Persian campaign or invasion of Iran (Persian: اشغال ایران در جنگ جهانی اول) was a series of military conflicts between the Ottoman Empire, British Empire and Russian Empire in various areas of what was then neutral Qajar Iran, beginning in December 1914 and ending with the Armistice of Mudros on 30 October 1918, as part of the Middle Eastern Theatre of World War I. The fighting also involved local Persian units, who fought against the Entente and Ottoman forces in Iran. The conflict proved to be a devastating experience for Persia. Over 2 million Persian civilians died in the conflict, mostly due to the Persian famine of 1917–1919, influenced by British and Russian actions. The Qajar government's inability to maintain the country's sovereignty during and immediately after the First World War led to a coup d'état in 1921 and Reza Shah's establishment of the Pahlavi dynasty.

== Background ==
Persia declared its neutrality during the outbreak of the First World War. Despite this, the country quickly became affected by the pre-war rivalry between the Allies and the Central Powers. Foreign interests in Persia were primarily driven by its strategic location between British India, Imperial Russia, Afghanistan, and the Ottoman Empire, as well as the country's oil reserves, which were first discovered on 26 May 1908. In the Anglo-Russian Treaty of 1907, the Russian and British governments agreed to divide Persia into three regions, with the Russians laying claim to northern Persia, the part adjacent to their previously conquered territories in the Transcaucasia, and the British claimed the south which bordered British India (a third region was left as a buffer zone). The 1907 treaty capped off several decades of the Great Game between the Russians and British. The treaty was signed at a time when German imperial expansion into the region was underway and the agreement served both Russia and Britain by providing a counterweight to increasing German regional influence and potential future expansion into the region.

The German Empire established its Intelligence Bureau for the East on the eve of World War I, dedicated to promoting and sustaining subversive and nationalist agitations in British India and the Persian and Egyptian satellite states. The bureau was involved in intelligence and subversive missions to Persia and Afghanistan to dismantle the Anglo-Russian Entente. The bureau's operations in Persia were led by Wilhelm Wassmuss. The Germans hoped to free Persia from British and Russian influence and to further create a wedge between Russia and the British, eventually leading to an invasion of British India by locally organised armies.

The Ottoman intervention in the Persian theatre was primarily driven by the necessity to neutralise escalating threats to the flanks of the Sixth Army. Following diplomatic pressure from the British Raj, which feared the influence of Pan-Islamism on the Indian Muslim population, the Russian Empire was urged to deploy significant forces along the Tehran–Hamadan–Khanaqin axis. This maneuver was strategically designed to allow Russian Caucasian corps to advance toward Mosul and Baghdad with minimal resistance.

The operational situation deteriorated when the 1st Russian Caucasian Corps seized the Paytak Pass, forcing the detachment under Miralay Arthur Bopp to retreat from Qasr-e Shirin toward Khanaqin. This retreat directly jeopardised the logistical lines of the Ottoman Sixth Army, necessitating the deployment of larger formations to the Persian front to mitigate the risk of encirclement. Despite the expanding British presence in Mesopotamia, Enver Pasha, the Deputy Commander-in-Chief, prioritised the Russian threat in Persia over the British forces on the Iraq front. He advocated for the redeployment of the XIII Corps from the Tigris sector to the Persian theatre. Influenced by intelligence reports from Nizam-us Saltana and Miralay Arthur Bopp—which the Sixth Army Command perceived as critical despite their later characterisation as exaggerated—Ottoman leadership shifted its focus toward implementing decisive countermeasures in Western Persia.

Beyond immediate tactical requirements, the Ottoman military's strategic goal was to disrupt Russian and British access to the hydrocarbon resources around the Caspian Sea. While aligned with German interests to undermine Entente influence, the Ottoman Ministry of War pursued a distinct regional agenda. Enver Pasha envisioned that a decisive victory in the key cities of Persia would secure a corridor to Azerbaijan, Central Asia, and potentially the borders of British India.

This initiative formed a core component of Enver Pasha's Pan-Turanian project, which sought to establish an extended network of nationalistic states independent of European colonial influence. Strategically, this position was based on the assumption that European powers lacked the resources to sustain their colonial administrations amidst the strains of a global war. Central to this objective was countering the Anglo-Persian Oil Company, which held exclusive rights to petroleum deposits throughout the Persian Empire, except in the northern provinces. By targeting these assets, the Ottoman leadership aimed to dismantle the economic foundation of British maritime power—specifically the oil supply for the Royal Navy—while expanding Ottoman political influence toward the East.

== Forces ==
The Persian forces were established around certain districts, and not one single force. Each district furnished its own battalion and each province had several battalions. Each district depending on the tribal grouping furnished one or sometimes two battalions usually under their own chiefs. The strength of battalions was from 600 to 800. They had artillery batteries whose strength ranged from four to eight guns. Irregular troops amounted to about 50,000 in each district, with ranks composed of tribal horsemen and an uncertain number of footmen, all poorly armed. It was not uncommon of the chiefs, who controlled the battalions, to change sides. Some of these forces were Qashqai, Tangistani, Laristani, and Khamseh tribesmen. There was also the Persian Central Government Gendarmerie, which had Swedish officers and consisted of about 6,000 troops, of which only 2,000 were mounted. They were in six regiments, each of nine battalions, and their armament included Mauser rifles, twelve machine guns, and four mountain guns. The Persian forces were dispersed at Tehran, Qazvin, and Hamadan with the objective of keeping the country's main roads, which covered an estimated distance of 930 miles, under government control.

In late 1914, Enver Pasha gave orders to Lt. Col. Kâzım Bey, commander of the 1st Expeditionary Force (11 December), and Lt. Col. Halil Bey, commander of the 5th Expeditionary Force (25 December): "Your duty is to move with your division towards Persia and proceed through Tabriz to Dagestan, where you will ignite a general rebellion and repulse the Russians from the shores of the Caspian Sea."

The German operations were carried out by Wilhelm Wassmuss and Count Kanitz. Wassmuss, known as the German Lawrence, was a German consular official in Persia who loved the desert, and wore the flowing robes of a desert tribesman. He persuaded his superiors in Constantinople that he could lead Persian tribes in a revolt against Britain.

In 1914, the British Indian Army had several units located in the southern influence zone; its officers were experienced in fighting tribal forces through decades of conflict on the North-Western Frontier. In 1916, the British government formed the South Persian Rifles to protect their interests in Persia. At the end of 1917, a British force headed by Major-General Lionel Dunsterville was established. He arrived to take command in Baghdad on 18 January 1918. The British troops of Dunsterville eventually numbered about 1,000. They were supported by a field artillery battery, machine gun section, three armoured cars, and two airplanes. Together with mobile field hospitals, staff officers, headquarters staff, etc., the total force must have numbered about 1,300. Dunsterville was ordered to "proceed from Mesopotamia through Persia to the port of Anzali, then board ship to Baku and onwards."

Russia already had forces in Persia when the war began. The Persian Cossack Brigade and a small contingent of the Russian Caucasus Army under the Armenian General Tovmas Nazarbekian were stationed there. The Cossack Brigade consisted of eight squadrons, a small battalion of infantry and a horse battery of six Krupp guns; their total strength did not exceed 2,000. Besides this force, in 1912 Russia obtained the formal consent of the Persian government to the formation of a similar Cossack Brigade at Tabriz under Russian officers. Its formation was a condition for the withdrawal of Russian troops from Iranian Azerbaijan, which, at the onset of the war, Russia had not implemented. The Russians also moved one detachment of Armenian volunteer units under the command of Andranik Ozanian to the region.

Forces engaged at the Campaign

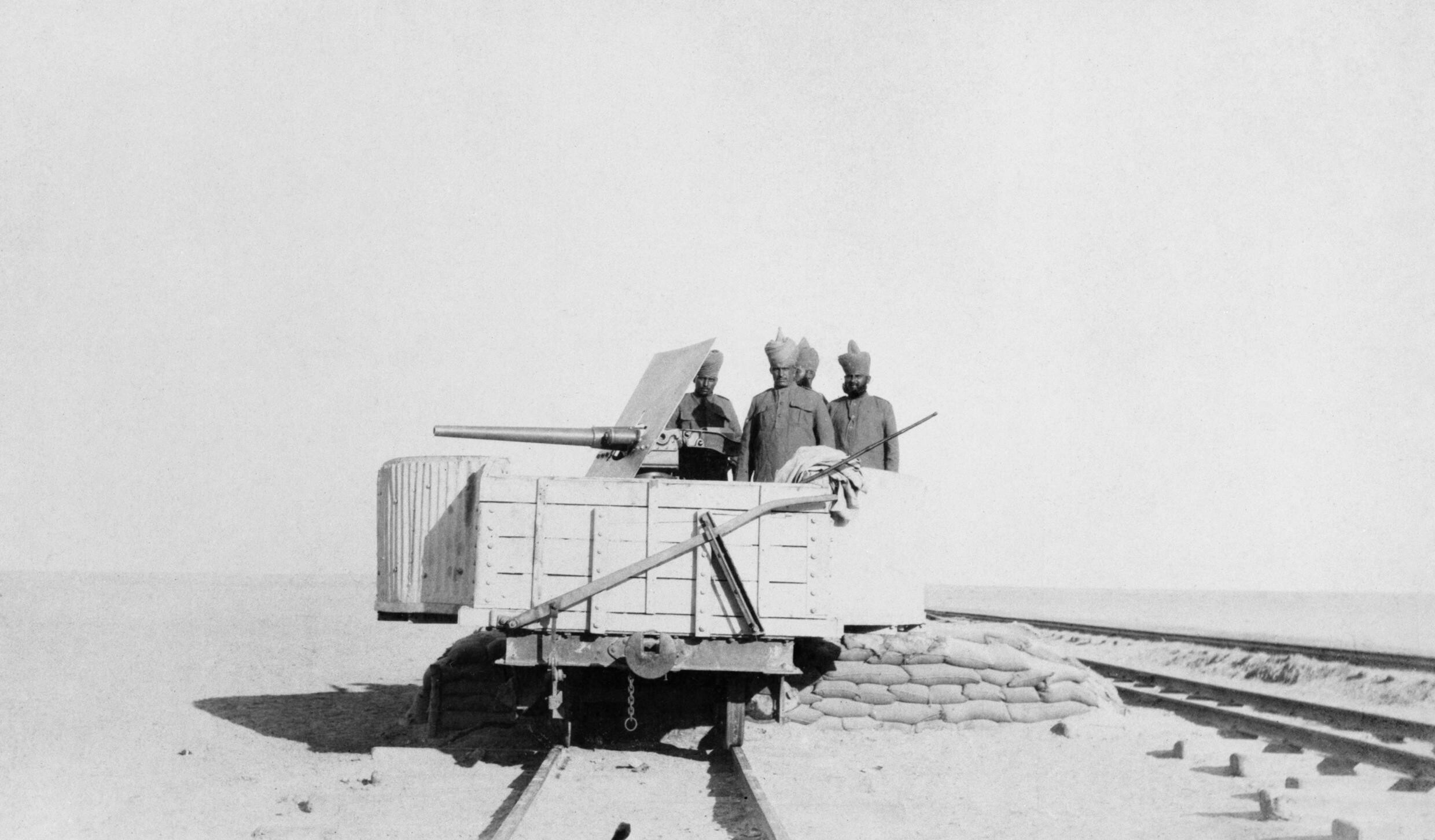
British Indian Army in Mesopotamia

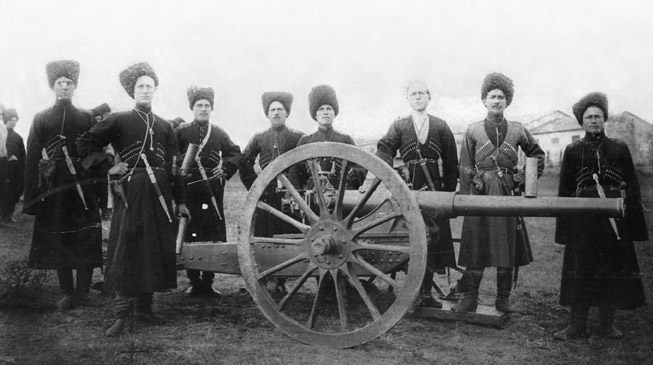
Nikolai Baratov commanded Terek Cossacks under Russian Caucasus Army

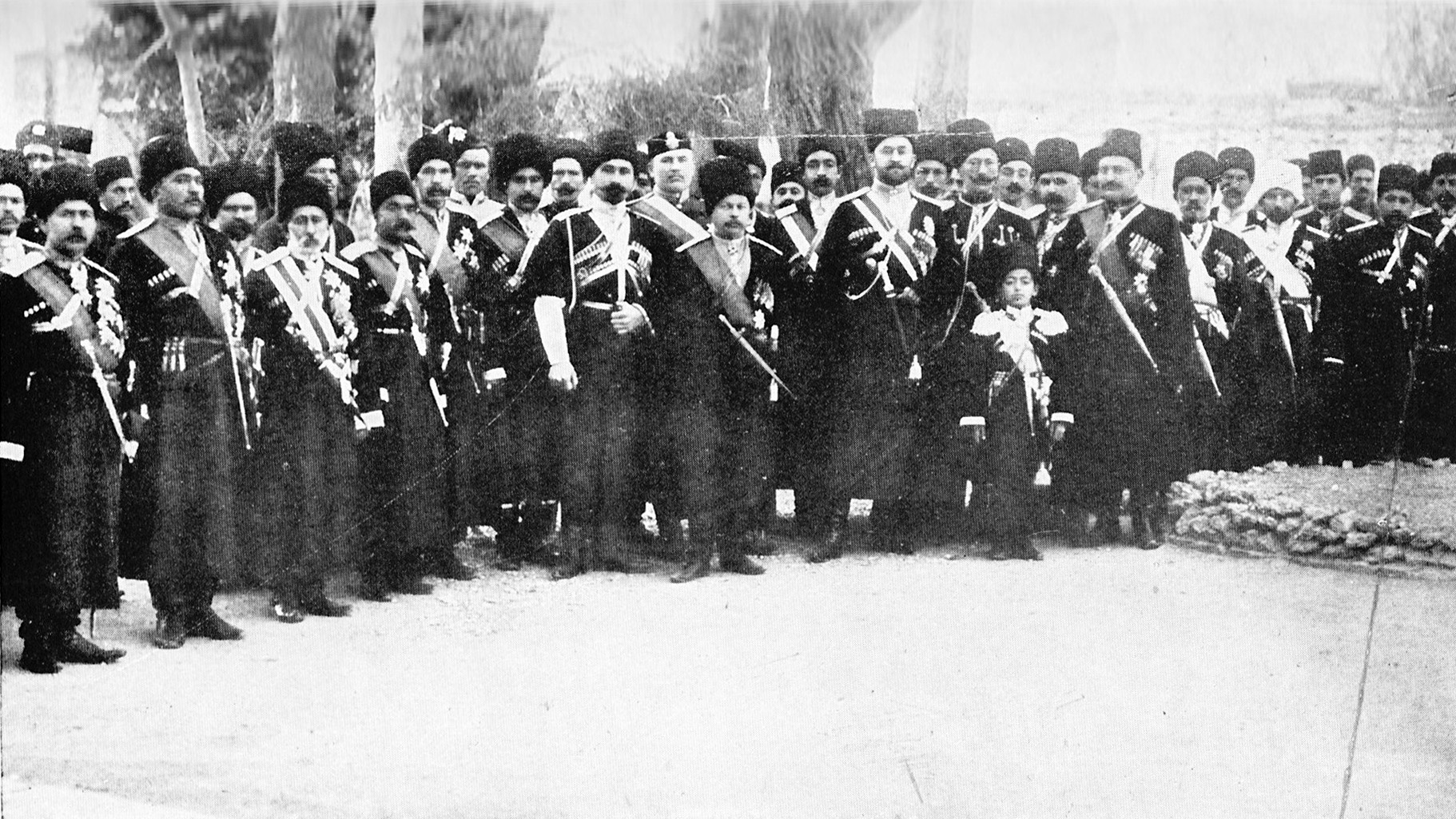
Persian Cossack Brigade

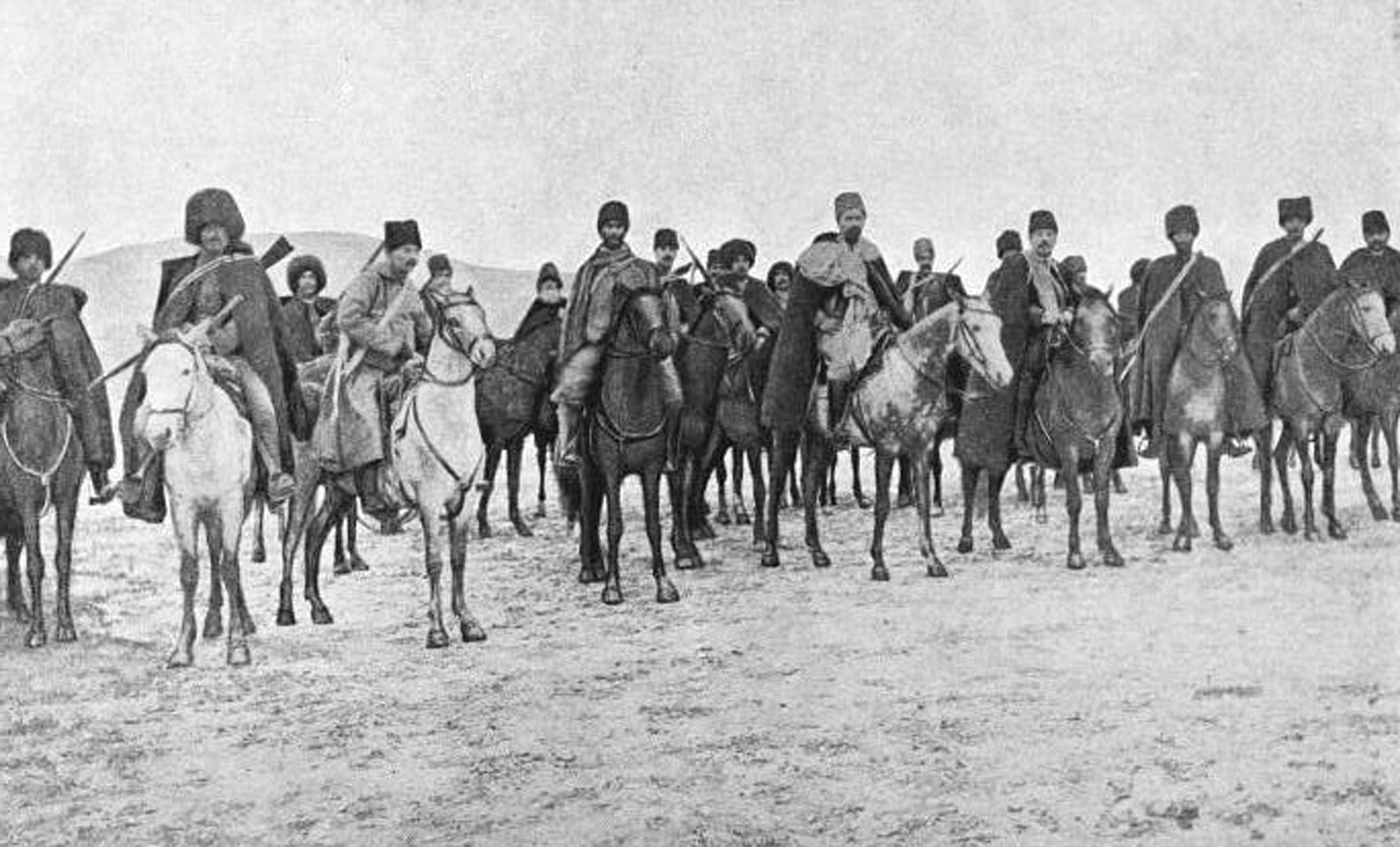
1914, Staff of Armenian volunteer units

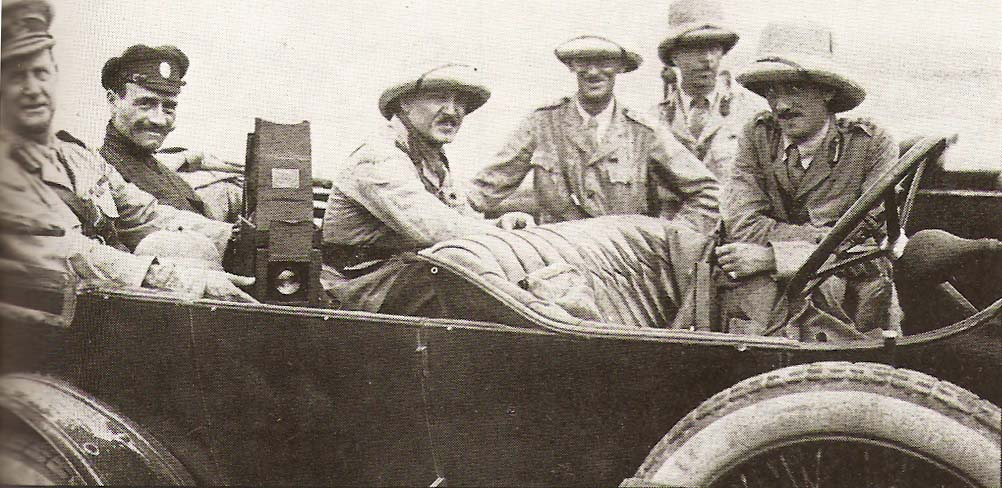
Dunsterville with the staff of Dunsterforce

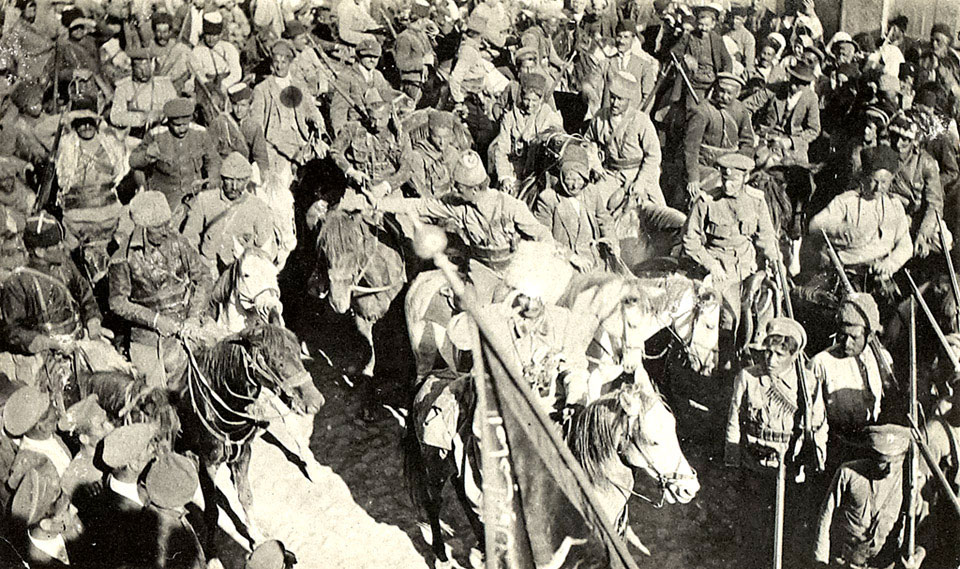
Assyrian General Agha Petros saluting his men after capturing Turkish soldiers and their banner

== Battle zone ==
The engagements were in Iranian Azerbaijan, comprising the modern provinces of East Azerbaijan, West Azerbaijan, and Ardabil, and including cities such as Tabriz, Urmia, Ardabil, Maragheh, Marand, Mahabad, and Khoy.

== Operations ==
=== Prelude ===
The central Persian government had difficulties in establishing order before the war. In a single year; the Qashqai tribesmen, the most powerful in southern Persia, defied the governor-general and raided in Fars, as did the Boyer Ahmad-i tribesmen; the Khamseh tribesmen raided the caravan routes in Kermān Province; and other tribes raided in Fars, Yazd Province and Kermān Province from time to time. The government-controlled gendarmerie had gradually established themselves, although not wholly, and engaged a number of tribesmen. The authorities constructed posts along the routes which they held at the outbreak of war.

Russia maintained forces in northern Persia, ostensibly to protect the Armenian and Assyrian Christians. Tabriz was occupied in 1909; Urmia and Khoi in 1910. This measure enabled the Russians not only to control Persia, but also to secure the road from their rail-head at Djoulfa to the Ottoman province of Van through Khoi.

On 28 July 1914, the First World War began. At first the Ottoman Empire did not take any serious action. However, the security of the region began to decline even before the Russian-Ottoman conflict. Disturbances began along the border. A notable attack was made on Urmia, ostensibly by Kurdish tribesmen. About the same time the Russians closed the Ottoman consulates in Urmia, Tabriz and Khoi, and expelled Kurds and other Sunni Muslims from the villages around Urmia. Arms were given at the same time to some of the Armenians and Assyrians. Russian authorities distributed 24,000 rifles to some of the Kurdish tribesmen that sided with them in Persia and Van Province. Russian-Ottoman conflicts began with the Bergmann Offensive on 2 November 1914.

=== Late 1914 ===
In December 1914, General Myshlaevsky ordered a withdrawal from Persia at the height of the Battle of Sarikamish. Only one brigade of Russian troops, under the command of General Nazarbekoff, and one battalion of Armenian volunteers scattered throughout Salmast and Urmia remained. Contact was limited to skirmishes on the border of northern Persia. The presence of Russian cavalry units kept them quiet. Enver established [one division] troops from conscripted at Constantinople [25 December]. This unit was given under the command of Khalil Bey. While [K?]Halil Bey's troops were preparing for the operation, a small group had already crossed the Persian frontier. After repulsing a Russian offensive toward Van, Van Gendarmerie Division [commanded by Major Ferid], a lightly equipped paramilitary formation, had chased the enemy into Persia.

On 14 December 1914, Van Jandarma Division occupied the city of Qotur. Later, proceeded towards Khoy. It was supposed to keep this passage open to Kâzım Bey (5th Expeditionary Force) and Halil Bey units (1st Expeditionary Force) who were to move towards Tabriz from the bridgehead established at Qotur. However, the Battle of Sarıkamısh depleted the Ottoman forces and these forces to be deployed to Persia were needed elsewhere. On 10 January, the 5th Expeditionary Force, which was on the way to Persia, was rerouted north to the Third Army and soon it was followed by the 1st Expeditionary Force.

=== 1915 ===
In 1915, Wilhelm Wassmuss conferred with local chiefs and distributed pamphlets urging revolt. He was arrested by a local chief, and turned over to the British, but managed to escape. He hoped to incite a revolt through pro-German members of the Persian government, in conjunction with an Ottoman advance towards Kermanshah and Hamadan.

On 4 January 1915, a volunteer detachment led by Omer Naci Bey, who was sent to Persia on a special mission by Talat Pasha, captured the city of Urmia. One week later, the "Mosul Group" commanded by Omer Fevzi Bey entered Tabriz without facing much resistance, having apparently taken the Russian leadership completely by surprise. Though referred as Khalil Bey by Aram, Omer Fevzi with his (superior) forces captured the city of Urmia in a few hours and marched on Salmast. At the end of 1914, Omer Fevzi who was identified as Khalil took nearly a thousand Russians prisoners. On 26–28 January 1915, in Sufian area, General Chernozubov fought a short engagement. Russia sent a strong force which succeeded in recapturing the city. On 30 January, Chernozubov entered Tabriz.

On 3 February 1915, General Nazarbekov launched a counter-offensive. This time, the Van Gendarmerie Division succeeded in holding its lines. In early March, Nazarbekov attacked with a stronger force, numbering seven battalions. On 7 March, Van Gendarmerie Division evacuated Dilman and began to withdraw, reaching Qotur three days later and entrenching there.

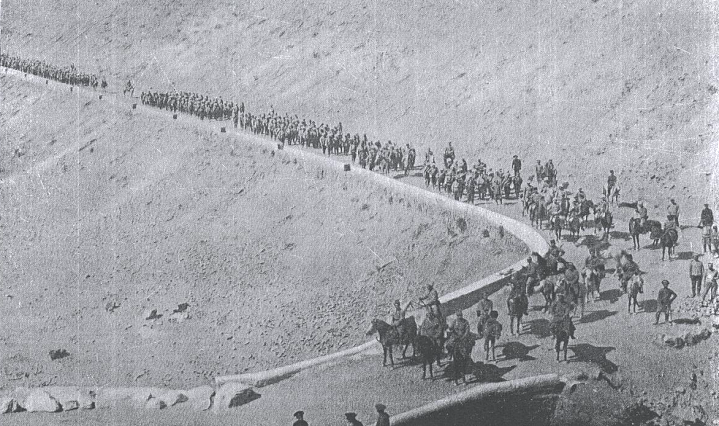
1st battalion of the Armenian volunteer unit under the command of the Andranik

In April 1915, the 1st Expeditionary Force under the command of Halil Bey moved towards northern Persia. The objective was the city of Dilman, and to clean this region from Nazarbekov's forces, which would provide a significant tactical advantage in the Caucasian Campaign. Diliman was the place of one of the fiercest battles between the Armenians and the Turks. The first battalion of the Armenian volunteers, under the command of the Andranik repulsed the attacks of Khalil Bey, until the Russian Chernozubov arrived. The newly arrived Russian force from the Caucasus were able to put Khalil Bey to flight. A poorly executed night raid on 14 April cost Halil Bey around 2,000 casualties. He lost 3,600 soldiers in the course of those three days. General Nazarbekov managed to push Halil Pasha regulars towards Başkale after the Battle of Diliman (15 April 1915), securing the situation. Halil Bey received the following cable from Enver Pasha and leave this theater of war: "Van is silenced. Roads to Bitlis and Iraq are under danger. In order to avoid even greater threats, withdraw as soon as possible and join the Third Army which would take control of these gateways."

On 8 May 1915, one of the twelve Armenian messengers from the Siege of Van had got through to Persia. An Armenian volunteer unit with Andranik, along with 1200 men, and commander Chernoroyal's division dispatched toward the Bashkaleh. On 7 May, they captured Bashkaleh. This group from Persia reached Van on 18 May. They had expected to find Van still in a state of siege, and were amazed at finding it in the hands of the Armenians. When word got to Yudenich, he sent a brigade of Trans-Baikal Cossacks under General Trukhin. With Van secure, the fighting shifted farther west for the rest of the summer.

During July 1915, Russian forces in the Caucasus Campaign made general retreat, with one Russian column retreating up to the Persian frontier. This retreat was the consequence of events in June 1915. Yudenich planned an attack to limit the Ottomans at Moush and Manzikert. He planned to outflank from Beyazit and Iranian Azerbaijan towards Van. However, the Russian advance toward the Caucasus campaign did not last long. The Russian forces suffered reverses. The command of Khalil Bey Eleven divisions of regular troops attacked the very center of the Russian Caucasian advance. A few days later, because of the Battle of Manzikert (16 July), and the later Battle of Kara Killisse, the Russian army retreated.

In August 1915, as the British occupied Bushire, the gendarmes under Akhgar retreated to Burazjan.

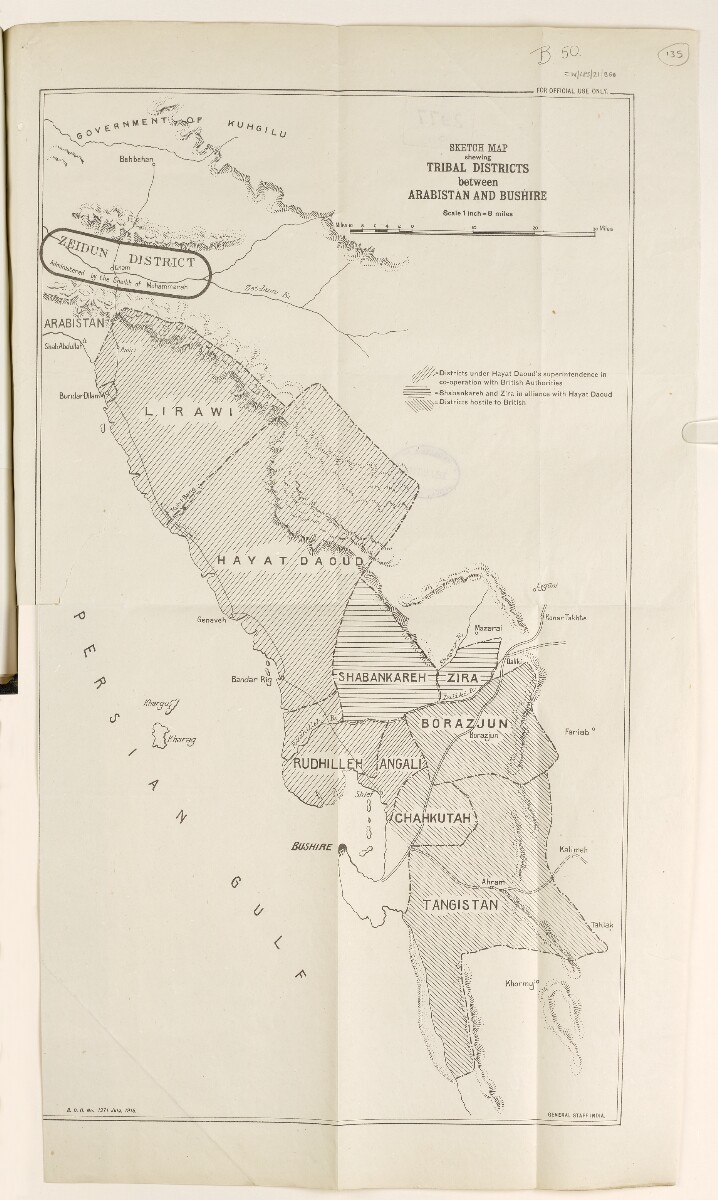
Political map showing different local tribal regions and alliances in the Bushehr area, 1915

In November 1915, Colonel Pessian (Taghi Pasyan), the commander of the Gendarmerie in Hamedan, launched an attack on the pro-Russian Persian Cossack Brigade at the Battle of Musalla. Pessian's gendarmes managed to disarm the Persian Cossacks, and some were even persuaded, after a patriotic speech, to join his forces. After this victory, the Russians advanced on the Persian Gendermerie, in Robat Karim forces under Mohammad Hossein Jahanbani and popular forces under the command of Heydar Latifiyan and in Hamedan-Kermanshah road forces under Colonel Pessian and Azizollah Zarghami (fa) could not defend Hamedan against an advancing Russian Caucasus Army which was superior in numbers and weapons. In Soltanabad, gendarmerie forces under Masoud Kayhan (de) were also defeated by the Russians. The gendarmes then retreated to Kermanshah. On 10 November 1915, pro-Central Powers Gendarmerie under Ali Quli Khan Pasyan defeated the pro-British Khamseh tribal forces of Ebrahim Khan Qavam-ul-Mulk and captured Shiraz. All British residents of Shiraz were arrested. The Gendarmes also captured Yazid and Kerman.

In the middle of November 1915, General Yudenitch, who was managing the Caucasian Campaign, dispatched two columns into the Iranian Azerbaijan; one, under General Nikolai Baratov, had orders to push southwest to Hamadan and Kermanshah, opening the way to Baghdad. The second column advanced to Isfahan, by way of Kum and Kashan. Another detachment of the Russian Caucasus Army marched on Tehran. On 14 November, the Austro-Hungarian and German Ministers left the capital. Still, Ahmad Shah Qajar was determined to remain in the city, and the Prince of Reuss undertook to hold strategical points with a force of 6,000 Persian gendarmerie, about 3,000 Turkish irregulars, and some number of disaffected Persian tribesmen (a force of approximately 15,000 in all). Nevertheless, by the end of the month, Tehran had been taken by the Russian Caucasus Army and its allied Armenian volunteers.

In December 1915, the Shah was induced to appoint a new pro-Allied cabinet with Prince Firman Firma at its head. On the 15th of the same month, Nikolai Baratov's column took Hamadan, encountering no significant resistance. During the last days of 1915, Sir Percy Sykes, with the temporary rank of Brigadier-General, was tasked with establishing a force of the South Persia Rifles, to be drawn from the local tribesmen by means of financial inducements. This initiative was intended to counteract the strong influence exerted by Germany across most of South Persia.

=== 1916 ===
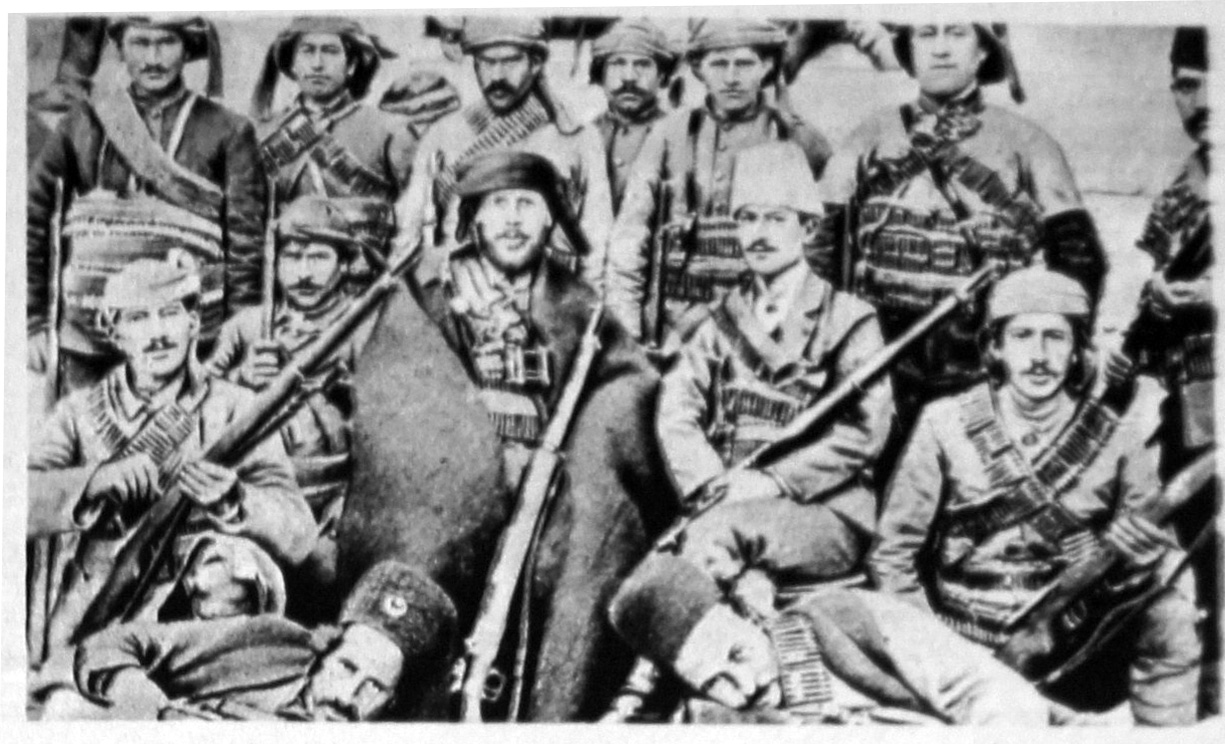
The Ottoman Army in Urmia, 1916

In January 1916, Baratov's forces drove off the Turks and Persian tribesman and occupied Hamedan. They proceeded to capture Kermanshah on 26 February, and Kharind on 12 March. By the middle of May, Baratov had reached the Ottoman frontier, 150 miles from Baghdad. It was expected that this unit would eventually effect a juncture with the British forces stationed in Mesopotamia. In fact, a Cossack company of five officers and 110 men left Baratov's Russian division on 8 May, rode southward for about 180 miles through the territory of disaffected tribesmen, crossed several mountain passes at altitudes of up to 8,000 feet, and reached the British front on the Tigris on 18 May.

On 26 February 1916, the Russians advanced and defeated the gendarmes, who then retreated to Qasr-i-Shirin and managed to hold the region until May 1916, when it was captured by the Russians. This time, many gendarmes gave up the fight, leaving to live in exile in Istanbul, Mosul, and Baghdad. In the spring of 1916, Ibrahim Khan Qavam-ul-Mulk and his Khamseh tribesmen defeated the gendarmes under Ali Quli Khan Pesyan and Ghulam Riza Khan Pesyan, who shot and killed each other. Other gendarmes, including the German Consul Roever and the Swedish Captain Angman, were arrested and tortured.

In early May 1916, at Enver Pasha's insistence, the Ottomans launched a second invasion of Persia. This was undertaken by the XIII Corps, roughly 25,000 troops; the Germans promised to contribute some artillery batteries, but this aid never came. On 3 June, the Russians attacked the 6th Infantry Division at the town of Hankin, in an attempt to encircle them. However, they were too thinly spread; their infantry were held in check, while their encircling cavalry were crushed. The Ottoman forces took lighter casualties than the Russians: 85 killed, 276 wounded, and 68 missing. This gave the Turks valuable time to strengthen their defenses. On 8 June, they crossed the border back into Persia.

In late May, the XIII Corps, under the command of colonel Ali İhsan Bey, began to advance against Baratov. For his part, Baratov hoped to capture Khanaqin and advance to Baghdad, sensing an opportunity to take the city as the British and Ottomans exhausted one another. On 3 June, he attacked Khanaqin once again, but, this time, the balance had changed. The Ottoman XIII Corps successfully repulsed Baratov's forces, and launched a counterattack. Ali İhsan Bey captured Kermanshah on 2 July and Hamadan on 10 August. Having lost half of his men, Baratov was forced to retreat north, stopping at the Sultan Bulak range. In August 1916, the gendarmes returned to Kermanshah.

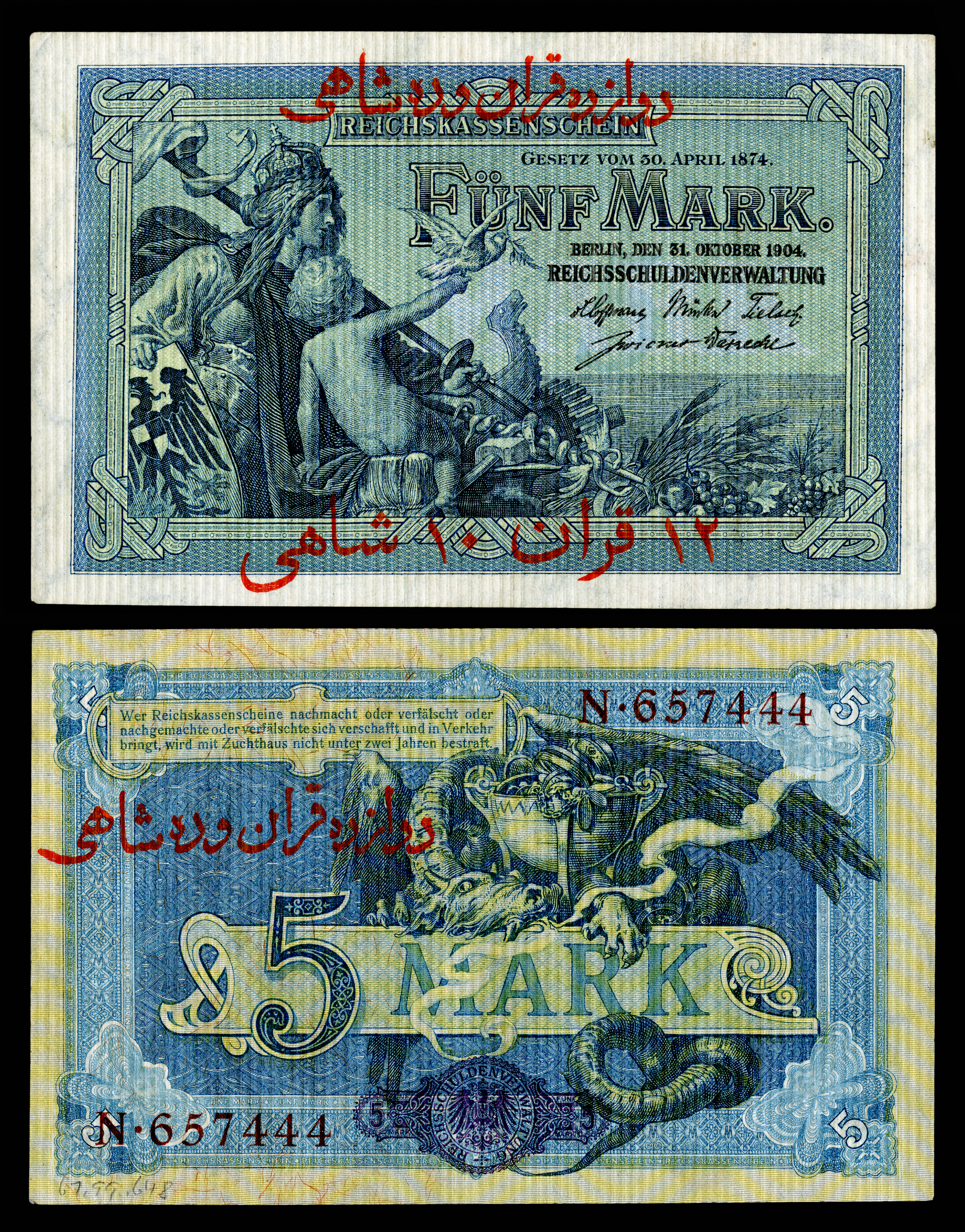
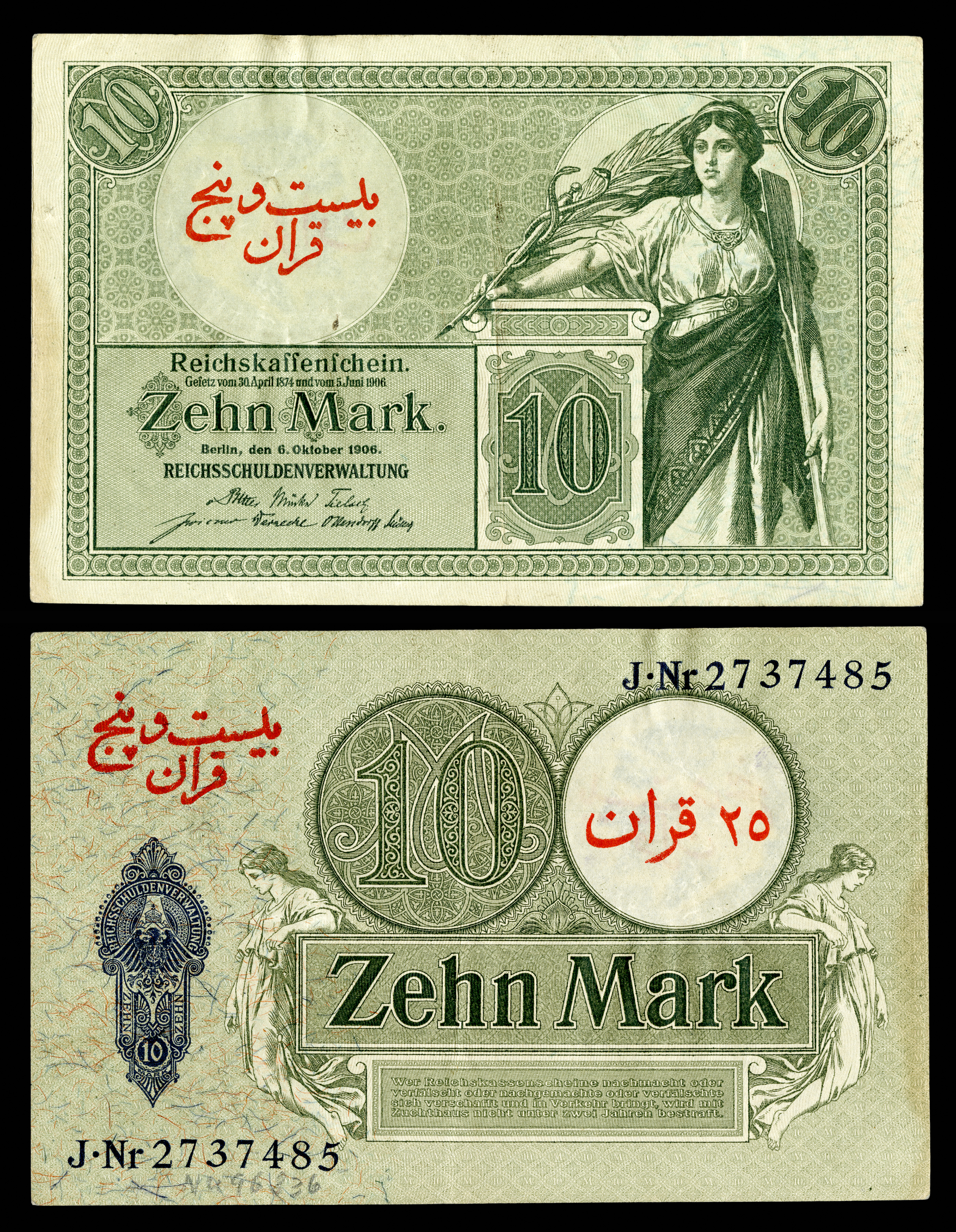
German Imperial Treasury notes
(5 and 10 Mark, 1904/06) with
red Persian denomination overstamp
for 12 qiran 10 shahi and
25 qiran respectively (1916–17).
Part of the toman issue by
World War I German forces in Iran.

On 12 June 1916, the British advance in southern Persia (led by Percy Sykes) reached Kerman. From here, he supported the Russians operations against the Ottoman Empire until June 1917, when he was withdrawn with the new Persian government.

In 1916, General Chernozubov sent a Russo-Assyrian military expedition into Hakkari. The squads within the expedition were led by the Church of the East Patriarch's brother Dawid; Ismail, Malka of the Upper Tyari; and Andreus, the Jilu Malik.

In December 1916, Baratov began to move on Qoms and Hamadan for clearing Persian forces and Ottoman troops. Both cities fell in the same month.

In late December 1916, almost all Swedish officers in the Persian Gendarmerie had been called to Sweden. Although around five officers stayed serving as volunteers.

Count Kaunitz disappeared without a trace, having either killed himself or been assassinated by disenchanted coup members. The premature coup was crushed in Tehran as Ahmad Shah Qajar took refuge in the Russian legation, and a sizable Russian force arrived to Tehran under Baratov after they landed in Bandar-e Anzali in November of that year. The pro-German coup members of the Majles fled to Kirmanshah and Qom without fighting.

=== 1917 ===
In 1917, the Church of the East patriarch Mar Binyamin, accompanied by the military leader Agha Petros, and at the invitation of the Russian consul, Basil Nikitin, travelled to the Russian embassy in Urmia for negotiations. Nikitin assured the Assyrians that, after the war, they would be granted land in Russia. The presence of the armed squads of Assyrians in Urmia irritated the Persians, who feared that the Russians might return and, united with the Assyrians, take power in the city.

The chaos caused by the Russian Revolution put a stop to all Russian military operations. In January 1917, the Grand Duke Dimitri Pavlovich Romanov was sent to join Baratov, and they established a Cavalry Corps headquarters at Qazvin, in northern Persia. In April of the same year, Baratov met with a Colonel Rowlandson, the British liaison tasked with linking the Caucasian Cavalry Corps to the British Dunsterforce. In the following months, however, Baratov's forces began to suffer desertions. By November, the situation was so dire that Baratov had barely an effective regiment to hand, many of his cossacks having returned to their Stanisa villages.

The new government removed the Grand Duke from his command and reassigned General Yudenich to a meaningless position in Central Asia, prompting his resignation. Around this time, the Russian army underwent a general disintegration, and there was no effective military force for the rest of 1917.

On 16 December, the Armistice of Erzincan was signed officially brought an end to the hostilities between Ottoman Empire and Russian Special Transcaucasian Committee. Berlin and the Porte began to dispute possession of the provinces along the Russian/Ottoman border. Enver Pasha believed that Germany had disregarded Turkish interests when the terms of the armistice were negotiated with Russia, and moved to disregard German interests in turn, sending armed forces to the region to oppose the British. A newly established Ninth Army, consisting of the I Caucasian Corps and IV Corps, was sent to Persia under the command of Yakub Shevki Pasha. This army's task was to "Stop the British advance in Persia, to prevent them from helping the Bolsheviks, to cover the area between the Lake of Urmia and the Caspian Sea, and, if necessary, to join the Sixth Army for the operation to capture Baghdad."

The Russian collapse left Van completely cut off from the Allies, and the British Army in Mesopotamia seemed unwilling to move very far beyond Baghdad. The Armenian population of Van prepared to resist on their own.

=== 1918 ===
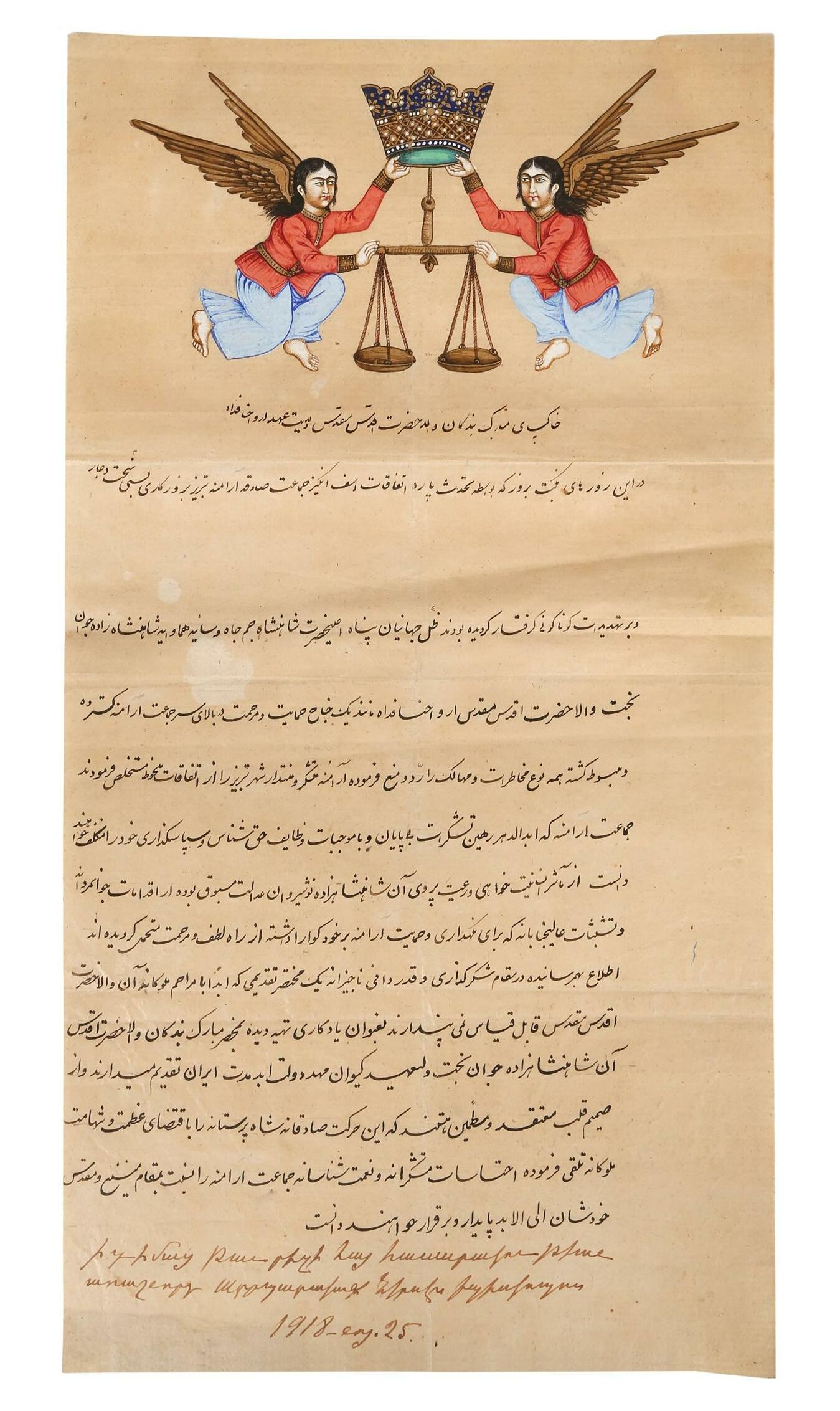
A letter from Archbishop Nerses Melik-Tangian of Tabriz to Crown Prince and governor-general of Azerbaijan Mohammad Hassan Mirza, c. 1918. In the letter, the Archbishop thanks the monarchy for their patronage, and beseeches the Crown Prince for support and protection in light of the Armenian genocide that had just commenced in Ottoman Turkey and the invasion of Iranian territory by the latter

During 1918, the British encouraged the Armenians to hold out, and picked officers and non-commissioned officers organized them under the command of Lionel Dunsterville at Baghdad. The military goal of this "Dunsterforce" was to reach the Caucasus via Persia, and, once there, to recruit and organize an army from the Armenians and other pro-Allied elements in the Caucasus.

In February 1918, the Caucasian Cavalry Corps consisted of Baratov, General Lastochkin, Colonel Bicherakov, Colonel Baron Meden, and about 1000 loyal Kuban and Terek Cossacks. Despite the Russian government's peace agreement, Baratov and his men assisted the British against the Ottomans, while the British remained in Persia until after the end of World War I.

On 3 March 1918, Grand Vizier Talat Pasha signed the Treaty of Brest-Litovsk with the Russian SFSR. The Treaty of Brest-Litovsk stipulated that the frontiers between Russia and the Ottoman Empire were to be returned to their prewar configuration, and that the cities of Batum, Kars, and Ardahan were to be transferred to the Ottoman Empire.

In April 1918, the Armenians of Van province were eventually evacuated and withdrawn from the region and retreated eastward toward Iranian Azerbaijan. Early in 1918, the Ottoman Third Army moved to the offense. Retreating Armenians from Van, joined by the Assyrians in defense, made a stand near Dilman but continued to retreat southward in the vicinity of Lake Urmiah. The Third Army did not pursue them.

On 8 June 1918, the IV Corps entered Tabriz. Yakub Shevki faced an Armenian volunteer force of 4,000 men coming from Van. They aimed to break through the Şahtahtı-Tabriz line and join with Ozanian's forces. On 15 June, the 12th Division of the IV Corps defeated this Armenian unit at a battle to the north of Dilman. The city of Dilman was captured on 18 June. On 24 June, Ozanian's forces managed to defeat opposing units and besiege the city of Khoy. The 12th Division came to the rescue and repulsed Ozanian's forces. At the same time, the 5th Division of the IV Corps had to retreat in the face of a 1,500-strong Armenian force. In the south, Urmia fall to the IV Corps on 31 July. By the end of July, there was an increasing British presence in Persia and the Ninth Army's advance came to a halt.

During July 1918, the British Army captured the greater portion of Mesopotamia during the Mesopotamian Campaign, as well as a large parts of Iranian Azerbaijan. Preparations were made for the establishment of a large camp for Assyrian and Armenian refugees near Bakubah, Iraq. Towards the end of September it was decided to raise four battalions from the Assyrians and Armenians refugees at Bakubah along the lines of an Indian Infantry battalion. The 2nd Battalion was established by Van Armenians. The 3rd Battalion was established by Armenians from other regions. The G.O.C. North Persian Force decided to locate his 2nd Battalion to Senna. The 3rd Battalion moved to Bijar.

By September 1918, the Ottomans consolidated their control over northern Persia, between Tabriz and the southern shores of the Caspian Sea. But they lost the rest of the region to the British. They would hold this territory until the Armistice on 30 October 1918 when the Ottoman Empire signed the Armistice of Mudros and the military operations ended.

In 1918, about half of the Assyrians of Persia died of Turkish and Kurdish massacres and related outbreaks of starvation and disease. About 80 percent of Assyrian clergy and spiritual leaders had perished, threatening the nation's ability to survive as a unit.

== Aftermath ==
After the Ottoman defeat in World War I, the partitioning of the Ottoman Empire soon followed. Enver Pasha's political vision ("If Russians are beaten in the key cities of Persia, they could be forced to out from the region") failed as Russian and Bakhtiari troops landed in 1920 and forced the pro-Turkish Majlis to disband. The immediate outcome of the Campaign was the Anglo-Persian Agreement, which gave drilling rights to the Anglo-Persian Oil Company. The treaty was issued by British Foreign Secretary Lord Curzon to the Persian government in August 1919. It guaranteed British access to Iranian oil fields. In 1919, northern Persia was occupied by the British General William Edmund Ironside to enforce the terms of the Armistice of Mudros. The British government also attempted to establish a protectorate over Iran, in addition to tightening their control over the increasingly lucrative Persian oil fields.

In late 1920, the Soviet Socialist Republic in Rasht was preparing to march on Tehran with "a guerrilla force of 1,500 Jangalis, Armenians, and this time Kurds, and Azerbaijanis were on their side", reinforced by the Soviet Red Army. But Soviet forces withdrew in 1921, which helped Britain in its goal of establishing a protectorate. In that year, a military coup established Reza Khan, a Persian officer of the Persian Cossack Brigade and then hereditary Shah of the new Pahlavi dynasty (1925). Reza Shah curtailed the power of the Majlis, effectively turning it into a rubber stamp. While Reza Khan and his Cossack brigade secured Tehran, a Persian envoy in Moscow negotiated a treaty with the Bolsheviks for the removal of Soviet troops from Persia. The coup d'état of 1921 and the emergence of Reza Khan were assisted by the British government, which wished to halt Bolshevik penetration of Iran, particularly because of the threat it posed to British India. It was later claimed by the British government that Britain provided "ammunition, supplies, and pay" for Reza's troops. However, Reza Shah's later anti-British actions, including fighting and deposing the puppets of the British government in Iran, such as Sheikh Khazal, strongly contradicted these claims.

== See also ==
- Ottoman invasion of Persia (1906)
- Anglo-Soviet Invasion of Iran
- Armenian genocide
- Assyrian genocide
- Caucasus campaign
- Military history of Iran
- Persian famine of 1917-1918
- Russo-Persian Wars
- Turko-Persian War
- Swedish intervention in Persia
- British occupation of Bushehr
