= British occupation of Bushehr =

British attack on the city of Bushehr in Iran

British occupations of Bushehr
- Part of Persian campaign (World War I) (third occupation)
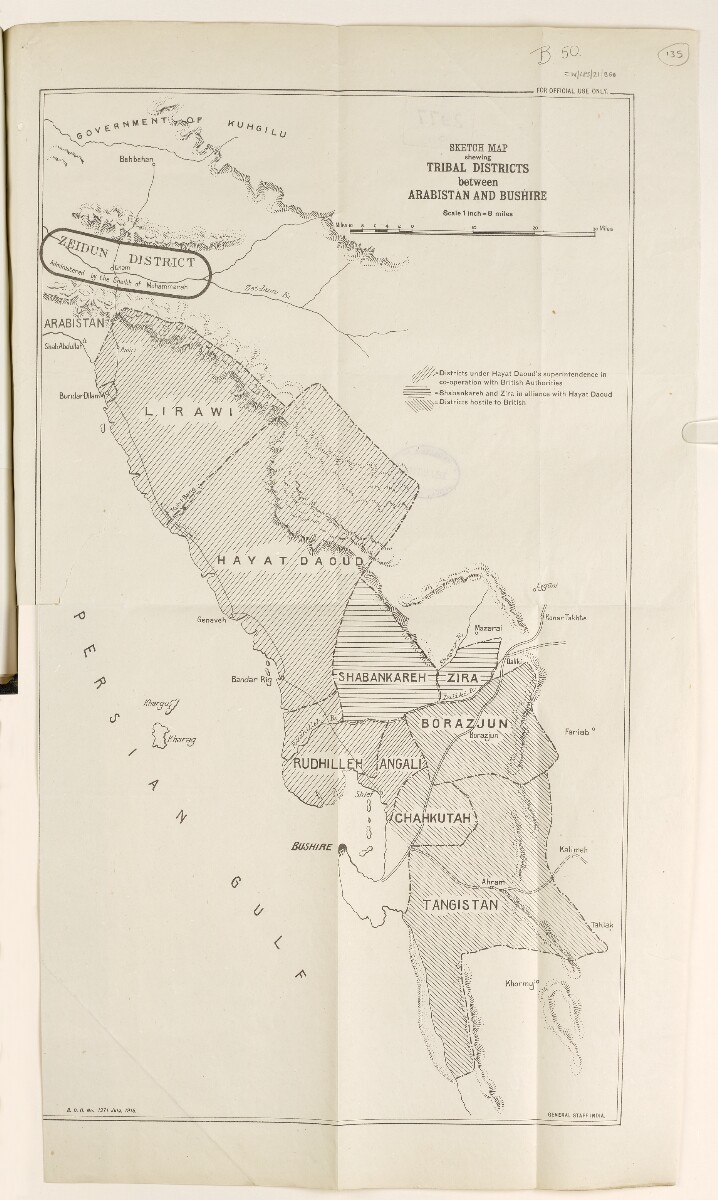
- Political map showing different local tribal regions and alliances in the Bushehr area, 1915
Date	1838, 1856, and 8 August – 16 October 1915
Location	Bushehr, Iran
Result	1st occupation: Iranian victory 2nd and 3rd occupations: British victory

Belligerents
Iran; South of Iran movement (Third occupation); The National Committee of the Guardians of the Independence of Iran; (Third occupation)	United Kingdom; British Raj

Commanders and leaders
(Iran) Rais Ali Delvari †; (Iran) Khalou Hossein Bord Khuni Dashti; (Iran) Hossein Chah Kutahi †; (Iran) Khezrkhan Fooladi †; (Iran) Esmaeel Khan Qashqayi; (Iran) Qazanfar Borazjani; (Iran) Ahmad Akhgar	(United Kingdom) Percy Sykes; (British Empire) Trevor; (British Empire) Olyphant †; (British Empire) Ranking †; (British Empire) Brooking; (British Empire) Nixon; (British Empire) Pennington †; (British Empire) Thornton †

Units involved
Iranian Gendarmerie; Tangestani fighters; Dashtestani fighters; Dashti fighters; Chah Kutahi fighters; Larestani fighters; Qashqai fighters	(United Kingdom) 16th The Queen's Lancers; (United Kingdom) 96th Infantry; (United Kingdom) Navy combat unit; (British Raj) 21st India Horse; (British Raj) 11th Rajputs; (United Kingdom) South Persia Rifles

Strength
Iranian boats: Mozaffari; Azarbaijan; Mazandaran	British Equipment: (United Kingdom) Artillery; (United Kingdom) About 30 ships including: Juno; Pyramus; Lorence; Dalhousie; (United Kingdom) Airplane
- Iran had officially declared neutrality in World War I.

The British occupied Bushehr or Bushire three times when British forces entered Bushehr during the rule of the Qajar dynasty, before and during World War I.

== Background ==
According to Encyclopædia Iranica, the British East India Company had a presence in Bushehr since 1763 due to its commercial importance. Later, due to the interference of the Iranian ruler Karim Khan Zand, the Company concentrated on the port of Basra, but following the capture of Basra by Karim Khan Zand, in 1778 the British re-established their commercial base in the Persian Gulf in Bushehr and continued to increase their influence in the Gulf for about a century.

== Occupations ==
=== First occupation (1838) ===
The first occupation of Bushehr was in 1838 (1217 SH - 1254 AH) during the reign of Mohammad Shah Qajar, when a British ship anchored in front of Bushehr, and 500 people disembarked and settled in Kuti (one of the old neighbourhoods of the port of Bushehr), where the house of a British person named Ballews was located. This action of the British was to put the Shah in a tight spot to lift the siege of Herat. This led to an uproar in Bushehr, and after that, the people's groups led by Bagher Khan Tangestani and Sheikh Hassan Ale-Osfoor (religious leader of Bushehr) expelled the British from Bushehr.

=== Second occupation (1856) ===
When Dost Mohammad Khan, the then ruler of Kandahar and Kabul, captured Herat in 1855, Naser al-Din Shah Qajar ordered an expedition to Herat. Herat was a city of conflict between Iran, the Russian Empire and Britain. With the capture of Herat by Iran, the then British government declared war on Iran. Because the Iranian government was indifferent to Britain's response, Britain attacked Bushehr in 1856 and occupied it in retaliation and to pressure Iran to leave Herat. At that time, Mohammad Karim Khan Kermani incited the people to resist the British occupation by writing a book titled "Naseriyeh".

This occupation ended with the Treaty of Paris in 1857. Iran pledged to withdraw from Herat and recognize Afghanistan, so British troops left Bushehr. On 12 June 1857, while staying in London, Karl Marx wrote an article entitled "The Persian Treaty" and criticized both the clauses of the 1857 Treaty of Paris and Britain for occupying Bushehr and the southern regions.

=== Third occupation (1915) ===
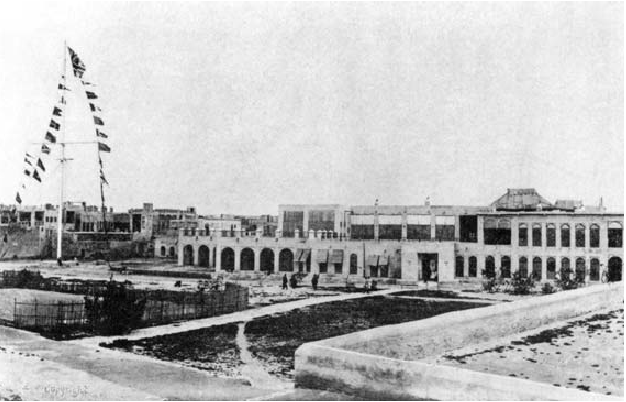
British command center in Bushehr, 1902.

Until the middle of the 19th century, British supremacy in the Persian Gulf relied on the development of Bushehr port. However, from the end of this century, the opinion of other countries such as the German Empire was attracted towards Bushehr and they opened consular offices in Bushehr. Iran's trade relations with Germany and the purchase of ships from it were unpleasant for Britain, which had maintained its customs status.

According to documents, Wilhelm Wassmuss arrived in Bushehr in 1913 as the second consul of Germany. With the start of World War I in 1914, the German consulate was activated to confront the British. In this way, Wassmuss had close relations with the nomads of southern Iran, including with Rais Ali Delvari. On the other hand, Iran declared neutrality to avoid entering World War I. The rivalry between Britain and Germany finally reached its climax with the arrest of two German consular officials in Bushehr by the British forces. The then government of Iran and the people of Bushehr protested this action.

On 8 August 1915, a British expeditionary force (consisting largely of British Indian Army troops) entered Bushehr from land and sea with the support of naval artillery and announced the occupation of Bushehr by issuing a city-wide proclamation. In this announcement, it was stated that Major Arthur Prescott Trevor has taken over all the affairs of the Bushehr government with the position of "Commander of the Military Government on behalf of the British Government". On the other hand, because the Iranian government cannot establish "order and security in the city of Bushehr and its surroundings", Britain was forced to take this action. According to the announcement, this action was "taken by His Majesty's government due to necessity. A necessity due to aboriginal tribes recent unfortunate attack on Bushehr in which two British officers were killed and three soldiers were injured."

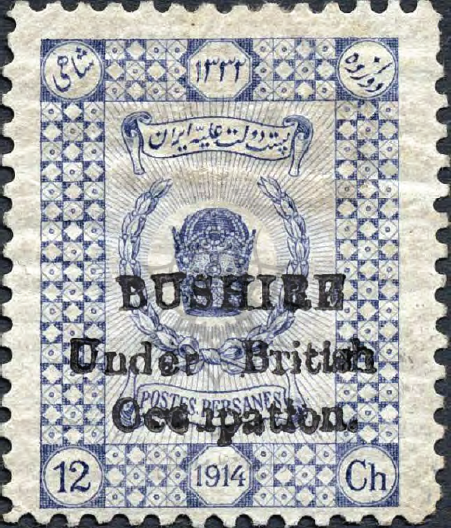
Stamp issued with "Bushire Under British Occupation" seal

Britain's action was the beginning of the series of struggles of the Tangestanis along with the help of Wilhelm Wassmuss against the occupation of Bushehr. One of the noteworthy points in the occupation of Bushehr was that the British sealed the stamps with their desired title. On these stamp it was written: "Bushire Under British Occupation". It is said that until the end of the occupation of Bushehr in October 1915, some types of this stamp were printed.

During this invasion, the British forces disarmed the local Gendarmerie forces, seized three Iranian vessels stationed in Bushehr port, including the Mozaffari frigate, and two armed boats named "Azerbaijan" and "Mazandaran". British forces raised the Union Flag over Bushehr's seat of government (Amiriyeh Building). Fourteen residents of Bushehr who protested the occupation the day after it commenced were arrested and deported to India.

== Aftermath ==
The command and logistics center of British military operations in Mesopotamia (against the Ottoman Empire) was Bushehr; therefore, the control of this area was very important for the British. The British fortified the entry bottlenecks to Bushehr by installing trenches, guard posts, artillery, and barbed wire.

== See also ==
- Portuguese conquest of Hormuz
- Anglo-Persian capture of Hormuz
- Abadan Crisis
- Treaty of Paris (1857)
- Iran–United Kingdom relations
- British military network in Iran
- Postage stamps of Bushire under British occupation
