= Majnun, Bushehr =

Majnun مجنون
- Village
- Location within Iran
- Coordinates: 29°17′30″N 50°49′15″E
- Country: Iran
- Province: Bushehr
- County: Ganaveh
- Bakhsh: Rig
- Rural District: Rudhaleh

Population (2006)
  - Total: 146
- Time zone: UTC+3:30 (IRST)
  - Summer (DST): UTC+4:30 (IRDT)

Majnun (Persian: مجنون, also Romanized as Majnūn and Majnoon; also known as Majaūn) is a village in Rudhaleh Rural District, Rig District, Ganaveh County, Bushehr Province, Iran. At the 2006 census, its population was 146, in 30 families.
