= Kuhak-e Kuchek =

Kuhak-e Kuchek كوهك كوچك
- Village
- Location within Iran
- Coordinates: 29°28′20″N 50°41′11″E
- Country: Iran
- Province: Bushehr
- County: Ganaveh
- Bakhsh: Rig
- Rural District: Rudhaleh

Population (2006)
  - Total: 167
- Time zone: UTC+3:30 (IRST)
  - Summer (DST): UTC+4:30 (IRDT)

Kuhak-e Kuchek (Persian: كوهك كوچك, also Romanized as Kūhak-e Kūchek, Koohak Koochak, Kūhak-e Kūchak, Kūhak-i-Kūchak, and Kūhak Kūchek) is a village in Rudhaleh Rural District, Rig District, Ganaveh County, Bushehr Province, Iran. At the 2006 census, its population was 167, in 31 families.
