= Ahsham-e Ahmad, Ganaveh =

Ahsham-e Ahmad احشام احمد
- Village
- Location within Iran
- Coordinates: 29°14′06″N 50°44′10″E
- Country: Iran
- Province: Bushehr
- County: Ganaveh
- Bakhsh: Rig
- Rural District: Rudhaleh

Population (2006)
  - Total: 45
- Time zone: UTC+3:30 (IRST)
  - Summer (DST): UTC+4:30 (IRDT)

Ahsham-e Ahmad (Persian: احشام احمد, also Romanized as Aḩshām-e Aḩmad and Aḩshām Aḩmad; also known as Aḩshām-e Aḩmadī, Khashm Ajhmadi, and Khashm-e-Ahmadī) is a village in Rudhaleh Rural District, Rig District, Ganaveh County, Bushehr Province, Iran. At the 2006 census, its population was 45, in seven families.
