= Chahar Borj, Ganaveh =

Chahar Borj چهاربرج
- Village
- Location within Iran
- Coordinates: 29°36′23″N 50°43′11″E
- Country: Iran
- Province: Bushehr
- County: Ganaveh
- Bakhsh: Rig
- Rural District: Rudhaleh

Population (2006)
  - Total: 263
- Time zone: UTC+3:30 (IRST)
  - Summer (DST): UTC+4:30 (IRDT)

Chahar Borj (Persian: چهاربرج, also Romanized as Chahār Borj; also known as Chahār Būrj and Chehār Burj) is a village in Rudhaleh Rural District, Rig District, Ganaveh County, Bushehr Province, Iran. At the 2006 census, its population was 263, in 63 families.
