= Bahmanyar, Iran =

Bahmanyar (Persian: بهمنيار), also rendered as Bahman Yari, in Iran, may refer to:

- Bahmanyar-e Gharbi
- Bahmanyar-e Sharqi
