= Chahar Mahal, Bushehr =

Village in Bushehr province, Iran

Chahar Mahal Persian: چهارمحل
- Village
- Location within Iran
- Coordinates: 29°36′39″N 50°45′30″E
- Country: Iran
- Province: Bushehr
- County: Ganaveh
- District: Rig
- Rural District: Rudhaleh

Population (2016)
  - Total: 461
- Time zone: UTC+3:30 (IRST)

Chahar Mahal (Persian: چهارمحل) (Note: Also romanized as Chahār Maḩāl and Chahār Maḩall) is a village in Rudhaleh Rural District of Rig District in Ganaveh County, Bushehr province, Iran.

== Demographics ==
=== Population ===
At the time of the 2006 National Census, the village's population was 471 in 106 households. The following census in 2011 counted 494 people in 128 households. The 2016 census measured the population of the village as 461 people in 128 households.
