= Gav Sefid-e Kuchek =

Gav Sefid-e Kuchek گاوسفيدكوچك
- Village
- Location within Iran
- Coordinates: 29°36′03″N 50°41′59″E
- Country: Iran
- Province: Bushehr
- County: Ganaveh
- Bakhsh: Rig
- Rural District: Rudhaleh

Population (2006)
  - Total: 84
- Time zone: UTC+3:30 (IRST)
  - Summer (DST): UTC+4:30 (IRDT)

Gav Sefid-e Kuchek (Persian: گاوسفيدكوچك, also Romanized as Gāv Sefīd-e Kūchek, Gāv Safīd-e Kūchak, and Gav Sefid Koochak) is a village in Rudhaleh Rural District, Rig District, Ganaveh County, Bushehr Province, Iran. At the 2006 census, its population was 84, in 20 families.
