= Sarhan =

Sarhan may refer to:

== Places ==
- Sarhan, Iran, a village in Bushehr Province, Iran
- Sarhan, Refahiye, a village in Erzincan Province, Turkey

== People with the name Sarhan ==
- Monty Sarhan, American business executive
- Shareef Sarhan (born 1976) Palestinian visual artist, photographer, designer; founder of Shababeek for Contemporary Art (Windows From Gaza)
