= Jazireh =

Jazireh may refer to:

- Jazireh Rural District, the administrative subdivision of East Azerbaijan Province
- Jazireh-ye Jonubi, a village in Bushehr Province
- Jazireh-ye Shomali, a village in Bushehr Province
