= Mohammadi, Bushehr =

Village in Bushehr province, Iran

Mohammadi Persian: محمدي
- Village
- Location within Iran
- Coordinates: 29°17′05″N 50°47′22″E
- Country: Iran
- Province: Bushehr
- County: Ganaveh
- District: Rig
- Rural District: Rudhaleh

Population (2016)
  - Total: 444
- Time zone: UTC+3:30 (IRST)

Mohammadi (Persian: محمدي) (Note: Also romanized as Moḩammadī and Muhammadi; also known as Moḩammadī-ye ‘Askarī) is a village in Rudhaleh Rural District of Rig District in Ganaveh County, Bushehr province, Iran.

== Demographics ==
=== Population ===
At the time of the 2006 National Census, the village's population was 465 in 105 households. The following census in 2011 counted 423 people in 110 households. The 2016 census measured the population of the village as 444 people in 131 households.
