= Gav Sefid =

Gav Sefid (Persian: گاوسفيد) may refer to:

- Gav Sefid-e Bozorg
- Gav Sefid-e Kuchek
