= Qaleh Sarhan =

Qaleh Sarhan قلعه سرهان
- Village
- Location within Iran
- Coordinates: 29°16′49″N 50°50′48″E
- Country: Iran
- Province: Bushehr
- County: Ganaveh
- Bakhsh: Rig
- Rural District: Rudhaleh

Population (2006)
  - Total: 66
- Time zone: UTC+3:30 (IRST)
  - Summer (DST): UTC+4:30 (IRDT)

Qaleh Sarhan (Persian: قلعه سرهان, also Romanized as Qal‘eh Sarhān; also known as Sarḩān) is a village in Rudhaleh Rural District, Rig District, Ganaveh County, Bushehr Province, Iran. At the 2006 census, its population was 66, in 15 families.
