= Mal-e Mahmud =

Mal-e Mahmud or Mal Mahmud or Mal Mahmood (Persian: مال محمود) may refer to:

- Mal-e Mahmud, Bushehr
- Mal-e Mahmud, Fars
