= Gav Sefid-e Bozorg =

Gav Sefid-e Bozorg گاوسفيدبزرگ
- Village
- Location within Iran
- Coordinates: 29°35′07″N 50°41′46″E
- Country: Iran
- Province: Bushehr
- County: Ganaveh
- Bakhsh: Rig
- Rural District: Rudhaleh

Population (2006)
  - Total: 347
- Time zone: UTC+3:30 (IRST)
  - Summer (DST): UTC+4:30 (IRDT)

Gav Sefid-e Bozorg (Persian: گاوسفيدبزرگ, also Romanized as Gāv Sefīd-e Bozorg and Gāv Sefīd Bozorg; also known as Chāh Sefīd Bozorg, Gāh Sefid Buzurg, and Gāv Sefīd) is a village in Rudhaleh Rural District, Rig District, Ganaveh County, Bushehr Province, Iran. At the 2006 census, its population was 347, in 78 families.
