= Rud-e Shur =

Rud-e Shur or Rood Shoor or Rud-i-Shur or Rud Shur or Rudshur (Persian: رودشور) may refer to:

- Rud-e Shur, Bushehr
- Rud-e Shur, Hormozgan
- Rudshur Rural District, in Markazi Province
