= Puzgah =

Village in Bushehr province, Iran

Puzgah Persian: پوزگاه
- Village
- Location within Iran
- Coordinates: 29°33′03″N 50°40′47″E
- Country: Iran
- Province: Bushehr
- County: Ganaveh
- District: Rig
- Rural District: Rudhaleh

Population (2016)
  - Total: 629
- Time zone: UTC+3:30 (IRST)

Puzgah (Persian: پوزگاه) (Note: Also romanized as Poozgah and Pūzgāh; also known as Pūrgan and Pūzeh Gāh) is a village in Rudhaleh Rural District of Rig District in Ganaveh County, Bushehr province, Iran.

== Demographics ==
=== Population ===
At the time of the 2006 National Census, the village's population was 684 in 129 households. The following census in 2011 counted 764 people in 162 households. The 2016 census measured the population of the village as 629 people in 182 households.
