= Chahar Rustai =

Village in Bushehr province, Iran

Chahar Rustai Persian: چهار روستايي
- Village
- Location within Iran
- Coordinates: 29°32′47″N 50°46′55″E
- Country: Iran
- Province: Bushehr
- County: Ganaveh
- District: Rig
- Rural District: Rudhaleh

Population (2016)
  - Total: 2,365
- Time zone: UTC+3:30 (IRST)

Chahar Rustai (Persian: چهار روستايي) (Note: Also romanized as Chahar Roosta’i, Chahār Rūstā’ī, and Chehār Rustai; also known as Chāh Rūstā’ī and Chehār Rustar) is a village in, and the capital of, Rudhaleh Rural District in Rig District of Ganaveh County, Bushehr province, Iran.

== Demographics ==
=== Population ===
At the time of the 2006 National Census, the village's population was 2,247 in 501 households. The following census in 2011 counted 2,505 people in 626 households. The 2016 census measured the population of the village as 2,365 people in 693 households. It was the most populous village in its rural district.
