= Gedai, Bushehr =

Gedai گدائي
- Village
- Location within Iran
- Coordinates: 29°34′08″N 50°45′21″E
- Country: Iran
- Province: Bushehr
- County: Ganaveh
- Bakhsh: Rig
- Rural District: Rudhaleh

Population (2006)
  - Total: 40
- Time zone: UTC+3:30 (IRST)
  - Summer (DST): UTC+4:30 (IRDT)

Gedai (Persian: گدائي, also Romanized as Gedā’ī; also known as Kadā’ī and Kedā’ī) is a village in Rudhaleh Rural District, Rig District, Ganaveh County, Bushehr Province, Iran. At the 2006 census, its population was 40, in 7 families.
