= Rud-e Shur, Bushehr =

Rud-e Shur رودشور
- Village
- Location within Iran
- Coordinates: 29°27′45″N 50°46′06″E
- Country: Iran
- Province: Bushehr
- County: Ganaveh
- Bakhsh: Rig
- Rural District: Rudhaleh

Population (2006)
  - Total: 183
- Time zone: UTC+3:30 (IRST)
  - Summer (DST): UTC+4:30 (IRDT)

Rud-e Shur (Persian: رودشور, also Romanized as Rūd-e Shūr, Rood Shoor, Rūd-i-Shūr, and Rūd Shūr) is a village in Rudhaleh Rural District, Rig District, Ganaveh County, Bushehr Province, Iran. At the 2006 census, its population was 183, in 32 families.
