= Jazireh-ye Jonubi =

Village in Bushehr province, Iran

Jazireh-ye Jonubi Persian: جزیره ی جونوبی
- Village
- Location within Iran
- Coordinates: 29°25′14″N 50°40′06″E
- Country: Iran
- Province: Bushehr
- County: Ganaveh
- District: Rig
- Rural District: Rudhaleh

Population (2016)
  - Total: 748
- Time zone: UTC+3:30 (IRST)

Jazireh-ye Jonubi (Persian: جزيره جنوبي) (Note: Also romanized as Jazīreh-ye Jonūbī) is a village in Rudhaleh Rural District of Rig District in Ganaveh County, Bushehr province, Iran.

== Demographics ==
=== Population ===
At the time of the 2006 National Census, the village's population was 647 in 133 households. The following census in 2011 counted 770 people in 173 households. The 2016 census measured the population of the village as 748 people in 198 households.
