= Durr Al Najaf =

Quartz variety found in Iraq

Durr Al Najaf (Arabic: دُر ٱلنَّجَف) is a glossy and clear gemstone from the quartz family. The name means "pearl of Najaf" as it can only be sourced from Wadi-al-Salaam (Arabic: وادي السلام, romanized: Wādī al-Salām, lit. 'Valley of Peace') in Najaf, Iraq. The gemstone is found along the west of Najaf close by the Najaf Sea. It stands out among other stones for its unique translucency. The gemstones are collected at very specific times, especially on sunny days after rain which washes the stones and allows the sun to increase their glitter, making them easier for the collectors to find. The collecting locals know the best times to collect the stone as it holds religious value especially among the Shia Muslims.

Upon preparation of the stones to be worn as rings or necklaces, names of religious figures such as the names of Muhammad and his family, or an Āyah from the Quran are usually engraved on the stones by tradition.

Durr Al Najaf can be found in four forms:

- White Glossy Durr: also known as Star Durr
- Petrol Durr: known as such as it leans towards a bright black color
- Hussainy Durr: ranging from translucent to darker red
- Abu Shaara Durr: known for thin lines like hair hence its name

While Durr Al Najaf is not commonly imported or exported, it does have a market where collectors sell finished Durr Al Najaf stones to visitors to Islamic religious sites including Najaf, Karbala, and Kadhimiya.

== Religious and cultural significance ==
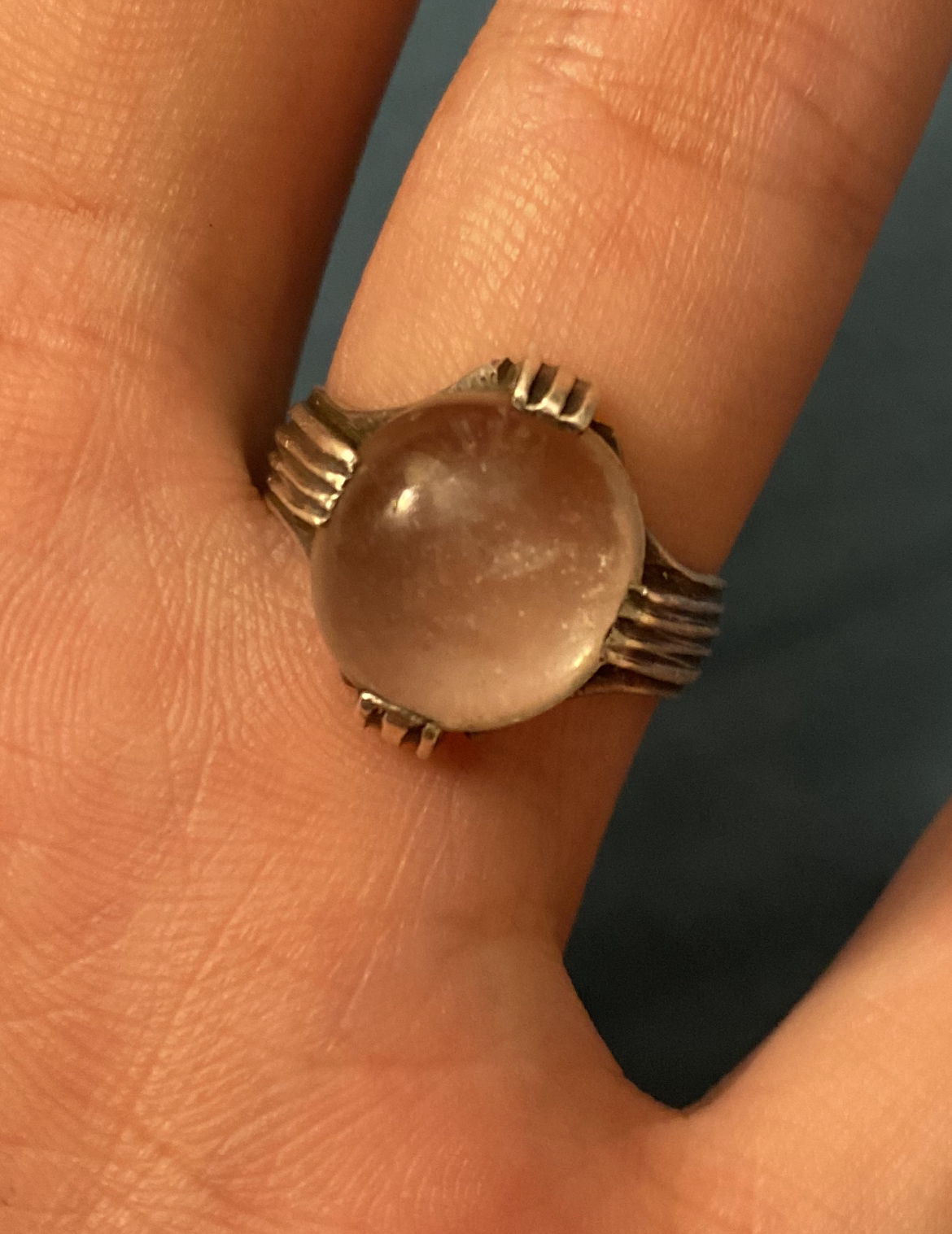
Durr al Najjaf ring worn with accordance to Hadith

Durr Al Najaf is a precious gemstone, one of many which hold special significance in Islamic culture. It is considered a sunnah to wear gemstone rings on specific fingers and ways. There are different interpretations relating to the way such rings are to be worn, one Hadith about Muhammad wearing a silver ring on his right hand which he used to put with the stone facing towards his palm. There is another Hadith stating that Muhammad wore his ring "on his small finger on his left hand" as mentioned in Sahih Muslim, a book containing many Hadith referenced often by Muslim scholars. While there are disagreements on which hand such rings are to be worn, there are a few things the interpretation of Hadith states for certain. One is that such rings are to be worn with the stone facing the palm of the hand. Another is not to wear rings on the middle and index fingers, also as mentioned in Sahih Muslim.

Some believe gemstones have mental and physical healing powers and that one should wear different precious gemstones for different purposes such as peace of mind and prevention of illness. However, there is no support for such beliefs in any Hadith.

== General references ==
- Al-Tibrīzī Ḵaṭīb. Mishkat Al-Masabih. Sh. Muhammad Ashraf, 1981.
- Eaton, Charles Le Gai, et al. The Book of Hadith. Book Foundation, 2008.
