= Genaveh Power Plant =

Power station in Ganaveh, Bushehr, Iran

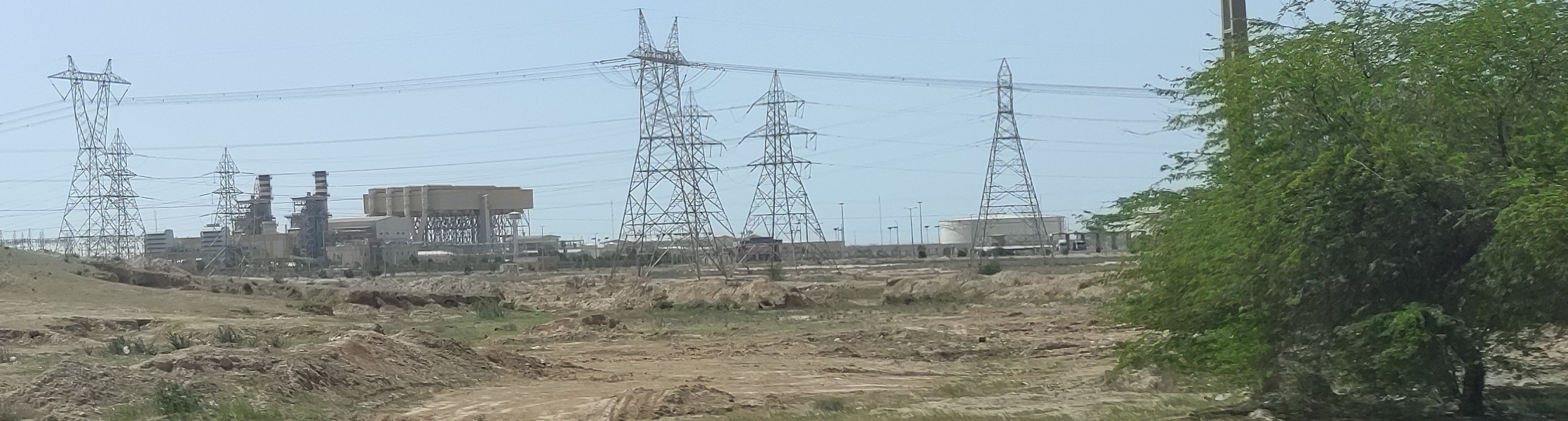
- Official name: نیروگاه گناوه
- Country: Iran
- Location: Ganaveh, Bushehr
- Coordinates: 28°42′3″N 53°32′41″E
- Status: Operational
- Commission date: 2013 (two gas units); 2016 (one steam unit)
- Construction cost: US$313 million
- Combined cycle?: Yes

Power generation
- Units operational: 3
- Nameplate capacity: 484 MW

External links
- Commons: Related media on Commons

The Genaveh Power Plant (Persian: نیروگاه گناوه) is a power station located in Ganaveh County, Bushehr Province, Iran.

== History ==
Two gas unit of generations were commissioned in 2013 with an installed capacity of 324 MW. One steam unit of generation was commissioned on 29 December 2016 with an installed generation capacity of 160 MW.

== Technical specifications ==
The power station was constructed on 120 hectares of land. It consists of two gas generating units and one steam generating unit. It has a total installed generation capacity of 484 MW.

== Finance ==
The power station was constructed at a cost of US$313 million.

== See also ==
- List of power stations in Iran
