= Mal-e Qayid =

Village in Bushehr province, Iran

Mal-e Qayed Persian: مال قايد
- Village
- Location within Iran
- Coordinates: 29°36′31″N 50°29′27″E
- Country: Iran
- Province: Bushehr
- County: Ganaveh
- District: Central
- Rural District: Hayat Davud

Population (2016)
  - Total: 4,564
- Time zone: UTC+3:30 (IRST)

Mal-e Qayid (Persian: مال قايد) (Note: Also known as Mal Gha’eh, Māl-e Qā’ed, and Māl-e Qāyed) is a village in Hayat Davud Rural District of the Central District in Ganaveh County, Bushehr province, Iran.

== Demographics ==
=== Population ===
At the time of the 2006 National Census, the village's population was 2,204 in 488 households. The following census in 2011 counted 3,092 people in 801 households. The 2016 census measured the population of the village as 4,564 people in 1,273 households. It was the most populous village in its rural district.
