= Shrine of Prophet Hud and Salih =

Islamic shrine

- Arabic: مقام النبي هود وصالح
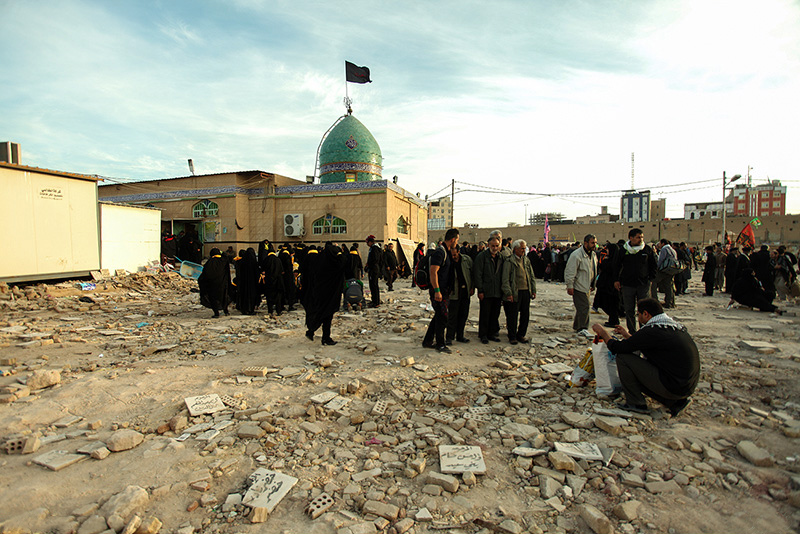
- Pilgrims gathered outside the shrine in 2015

Religion
- Affiliation: Twelver Shi'a
- Ecclesiastical or organisational status: Active

Location
- Location: Wadi-us-Salaam cemetery, Najaf, Iraq

Architecture
- Completed: Original structure 18th century, modern reconstruction in 1919
- Dome: 1

The Shrine of Prophet Hud and Salih (Arabic: مقام النبي هود وصالح) is a shrine located in the Wadi-us-Salaam cemetery in Najaf, Iraq. It is believed by locals to contain the tombs of Hud and Salih, two Prophets revered by all Muslims.

== History ==
The shrine was originally built by the cleric Moḥammad Mahdī Baḥr al-ʿUlūm in the 18th century. This original structure was made of stone brick with chalk. At the same time, some narrations from Shi'ite books reported the existence of graves for Prophets Hud and Salih.

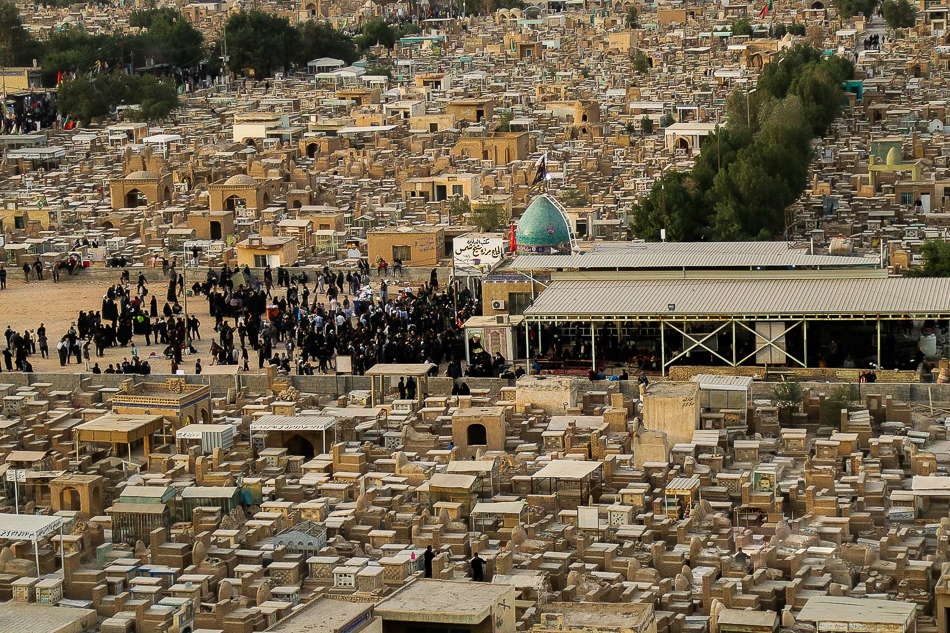
Aerial photograph of the shrine, captured in the year 2018

During the Iraqi Revolt, the British troops entered the Wadi-us-Salaam cemetery, and the shrine was desecrated on the 17th of October, in 1917. A year later, in the years 1918 until 1919, the shrine was repaired and given extensive renovations. With the assistance of Iranian companies, the dome of the shrine received new tilework.

In 2018, a new foundation stone was laid for a reconstruction of the shrine. The reconstruction was approved by the head of the Shiite Endowment Office, the main director of the Holy Shrines Department and other governmental positions exclusive to Najaf. The current head of the Shiite Endowment Office, Ala’ al-Mussawi, confirmed that a bigger and more decorated shrine would replace the old structure.

== See also ==
- Islam in Iraq
- Ziyarat
- Wadi-us-Salaam cemetery
