= Jazireh-ye Shomali =

Village in Bushehr province, Iran

Jazireh-ye Shomali Persian: جزيره شمالي
- Village
- Location within Iran
- Coordinates: 29°25′52″N 50°39′28″E
- Country: Iran
- Province: Bushehr
- County: Ganaveh
- District: Rig
- Rural District: Rudhaleh

Population (2016)
  - Total: 1,005
- Time zone: UTC+3:30 (IRST)

Jazireh-ye Shomali (Persian: جزيره شمالي) (Note: Also romanized as Jazīreh-ye Shomālī; also known as Jahreh, Jalīreh, Jazire, and Jazīreh) is a village in Rudhaleh Rural District of Rig District in Ganaveh County, Bushehr province, Iran.

== Demographics ==
=== Population ===
At the time of the 2006 National Census, the village's population was 839 in 160 households. The following census in 2011 counted 876 people in 222 households. The 2016 census measured the population of the village as 1,005 people in 260 households.
