= Hayat-Dawudi =

Ancient Lur tribe in the Persian region

The Hayat-Dawudi (Persian: حیات‌داوودی, romanized: Ḥayāt-Dāvūdī), also known as the Hayat-Davudi, were a Lur tribe that inhabited the Hayat-Davud dehestan. Their center was in Bandar Rig, and the Hayat-Dawudi chiefs were Khans of the district. They also held influence in Kharg.

== History ==
According to A.T. Wilson, the Hayat-Dawudi originated from the Behbehan district. Around the 15th century, they expelled the original Zoroastrian inhabitants of the region. One of the tribes' most prominent Khans was Amir 'Ali Khan Hayat-Dawudi, who was part of Lotf 'Ali Khan's entourage. After Hajji Ebrahim Shirazi's betrayal of the Zand monarch in 1791, he fled south to Bandar Rig, preparing for a counter-attack. Lotf 'Ali Khan defeated Nasir II, sheikh of Bushehr, handily outside Bandar Rig, and marched to Khesht.

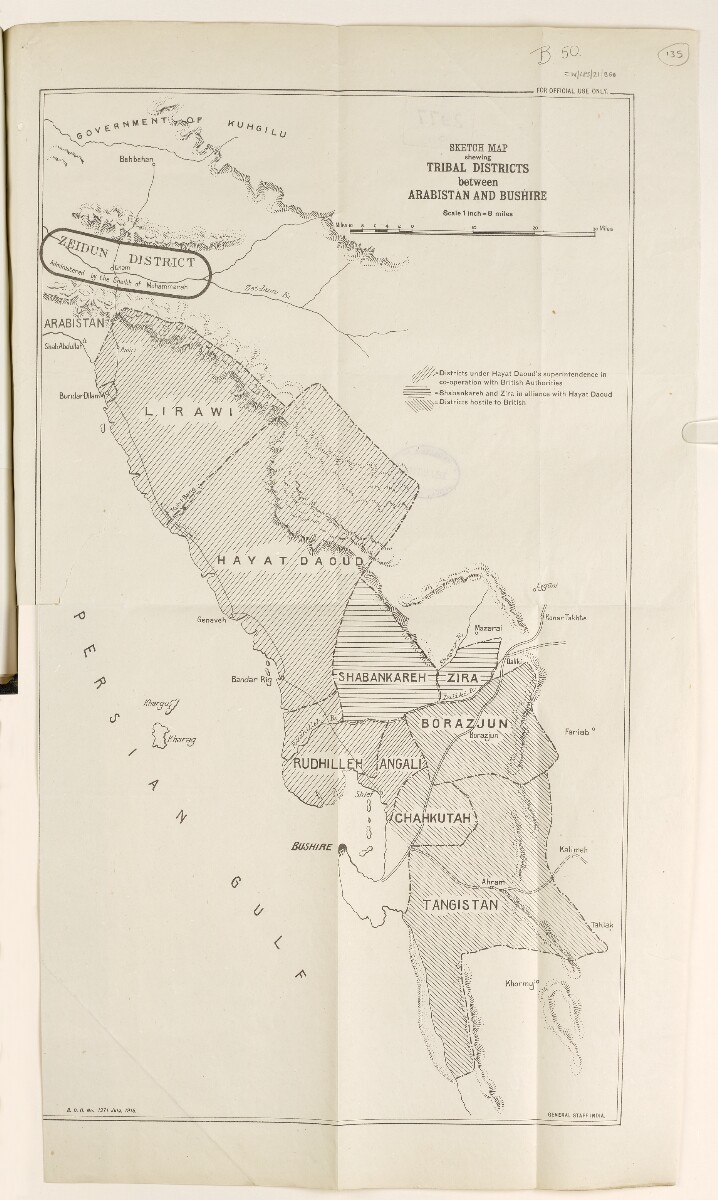
Map of tribal districts in the Bushehr region around 1915, showing local alliances. The Hayat-Dawudi are in the northwest corner.

A rival faction of Hayat-Dawudis, led by Morad Khan and his son Hosayn Khan, acquired preeminence over the tribe in the 19th century. In 1870, Hosayn Khan's successor, Khan 'Ali Khan, murdered the Khan of Bandar Rig and acquired the place. In 1896, Khan 'Ali Khan died and was succeeded by Haydar Khan.

The Hayat-Dawudi Khans, along with the local tribal khans (Borazjan, Shabankareh, Angali, Liravi) and the sheikh of Chah Kutah, were constantly in dispute, with raids and military conflicts being the norm. He allied with the British and captured German agent Wilhelm Wassmuss and his party in 1915, handing over important documents to the British. The tribe was described as "Anglophile" during World War I.

The Hayat-Dawudi supported tribal rebellions against the central government in 1946 and 1963, for which the latter one their leader, Fathallah Khan, was executed. The Hayat-Dawudis gradually lost their way of life and culture, under the exploitationary hold of the NIOC.
