= Chah Bordi =

Village in Bushehr province, Iran

Chah Bordi Persian: چاه بردي
- Village
- Location within Iran
- Coordinates: 29°38′26″N 50°31′50″E
- Country: Iran
- Province: Bushehr
- County: Ganaveh
- District: Central
- Rural District: Hayat Davud

Population (2016)
  - Total: 699
- Time zone: UTC+3:30 (IRST)

Chah Bordi (Persian: چاه بردي) (Note: Also romanized as Chah Bordī) is a village in Hayat Davud Rural District of the Central District in Ganaveh County, Bushehr province, Iran.

== Demographics ==
=== Population ===
At the time of the 2006 National Census, the village's population was 575 in 122 households. The following census in 2011 counted 755 people in 164 households. The 2016 census measured the population of the village as 699 people in 177 households.
