= Sarbast, Ganaveh =

Village in Bushehr province, Iran

Sarbast Persian: سربست
- Village
- Location within Iran
- Coordinates: 29°35′59″N 50°30′12″E
- Country: Iran
- Province: Bushehr
- County: Ganaveh
- District: Central
- Rural District: Hayat Davud

Population (2016)
  - Total: 1,724
- Time zone: UTC+3:30 (IRST)

Sarbast (Persian: سربست) (Note: Also romanized as Sar Bast) is a village in Hayat Davud Rural District of the Central District in Ganaveh County, Bushehr province, Iran.

== Demographics ==
=== Population ===
At the time of the 2006 National Census, the village's population was 1,064 in 218 households. The following census in 2011 counted 1,417 people in 318 households. The 2016 census measured the population of the village as 1,724 people in 427 households.
