= General Union of Cultural Centres (Gaza) =

Palestinian non-governmental organization

The General Union of Cultural Centres (GUCC; Arabic: الإتحاد العام للمراكز الثقافية) in Gaza, Palestine, is a non-governmental organization with membership of 52 cultural organizations and centres. It was established in 1997, and its headquarters are in Gaza City.

Shababeek for Contemporary Art is considered the representative face of the GUCC's visual arts programs. Other activities include youth-focused programming and education. Among the funders of GUCC's projects and activities are the AM Qattan Foundation, the Qatar Fund for Development, and Norwegian People's Aid.

The organization also participates in advocacy, such as participating in the "Gazavision" initiative in 2019 and calling publicly for boycott of that year's Eurovision Song Contest.

In 2018, representatives of the GUCC were involved in organizing the Great March of Return.

The Ministry of Interior in Gaza attempted to shut down the organization in 2010.

The organization is currently led by executive director Fadi Abu Shammalah.

== Members ==
Name in English	Name in Arabic
Fares Al-Arab for Development and Charitable Works	Arabic: مؤسسة فارس العرب للتنمية والاعمال الخيرية
Brilliant Tomorrow for Homes Sons Society	Arabic: جمعية الغد المشرق لابناء البلد
Basma Society for Culture and Arts	Arabic: جمعية بسمة للثقافة والفنون
Educational Forum Association	Arabic: جمعية الملتقى التربوي
Society of Palestinian Youth Pioneers	Arabic: جمعية الرواد للشباب الفلسطيني
Karama Sinter Committee for Culture and Arts - Rafah	Arabic: مجمع الكرامة للثقافة والفنون
Ajyal Association for Creativity and Development	Arabic: جمعية أجيال للإبداع والتطوير
Dar El-Shabab for Culture and Development	Arabic: هيئة دار الشباب للثقافة والتنمية
Charitable Future Society	جمعية المستقبل الخيرية
Amwaj Association for Community Development and Improvement	جمعية أمواج للتنمية والتطوير المجتمعي
Palestinian Crescent Authority for Relief and Development	هيئة الهلال الفلسطيني للإغاثة والتنمية
Association of University Graduates	جمعية الخريجات الجامعيات
Yaboos Charity Society	جمعية يبوس الخيرية
Benevolent Palestinian Child's Friends Association	جمعية أصدقاء الطفل الفلسطيني الخيرية
Palestinian Organization for Culture, Arts, and Heritage	الهيئة الفلسطينية للثقافة والفنون والتراث
Al Ferdaus Association for Woman and Child	جمعية الفردوس لتنمية المرأة والطفل
Wefaq Society for Women and Childcare	جمعية وفاق لرعاية المرأة والطفل
Alfajr Palestinian Youth Association	جمعية الفجر الشبابي الفلسطيني
Alnajat Charity Association	جمعية النجاة الخيرية
Ertiqaa Association for Community Development	جمعية ارتقاء للتنمية المجتمعية
Al-Taghreed Center for Culture and Development	جمعية التغريد للثقافة والتنمية
Beesan Benevolent Association	جمعية بيسان الخيرية
Nebras Association for Social Development	جمعية نبراس للتنمية المجتمعية
Al-Fukhary Rural Development Association	جمعية الفخاري للتنمية الريفية
Our Children Development Association	جمعية أبناؤنا للتنمية
Kotof El-Kheir Association	جمعية قطوف الخير
Albayader for Theater and Arts	جمعية البيادر للمسرح والفنون
