= Mohammad Salehi =

Mohammad Salehi may refer to:

- Mohammad Salehi, Bushehr, a village in Bushehr province, Iran
- Mohammad Salehi (weightlifter) (born 1983), Iranian weightlifter
