= Mal-e Mahmud, Bushehr =

Village in Bushehr province, Iran

Mal-e Mahmud Persian: مال محمود
- Village
- Location within Iran
- Coordinates: 29°35′19″N 50°47′22″E
- Country: Iran
- Province: Bushehr
- County: Ganaveh
- District: Rig
- Rural District: Rudhaleh

Population (2016)
  - Total: 476
- Time zone: UTC+3:30 (IRST)

Mal-e Mahmud (Persian: مال محمود) (Note: Also romanized as Mal Mahmood and Māl-e Maḩmūd; also known as Mollā Maḩmūd, Mollā Moḩammad, and Mulla Muhammad) is a village in Rudhaleh Rural District of Rig District in Ganaveh County, Bushehr province, Iran.

== Demographics ==
=== Population ===
At the time of the 2006 National Census, the village's population was 508 in 101 households. The following census in 2011 counted 524 people in 135 households. The 2016 census measured the population of the village as 476 people in 132 households.
