= Abbasi, Bushehr =

Village in Bushehr province, Iran

Abbasi Persian: عباسي
- Village
- Location within Iran
- Coordinates: 29°37′12″N 50°37′21″E
- Country: Iran
- Province: Bushehr
- County: Ganaveh
- District: Central
- Rural District: Hayat Davud

Population (2016)
  - Total: 704
- Time zone: UTC+3:30 (IRST)

Abbasi (Persian: عباسي) (Note: Also romanized as ‘Abbāsī; also known as Bāzanganeh) is a village in Hayat Davud Rural District of the Central District in Ganaveh County, Bushehr province, Iran.

== Demographics ==
=== Population ===
At the time of the 2006 National Census, the village's population was 687 in 151 households. The following census in 2011 counted 707 people in 168 households. The 2016 census measured the population of the village as 704 people in 189 households.
