= Shul, Ganaveh =

Village in Bushehr province, Iran

Shul Persian: شول
- Village
- Location within Iran
- Coordinates: 29°49′54″N 50°31′19″E
- Country: Iran
- Province: Bushehr
- County: Ganaveh
- District: Central
- Rural District: Hayat Davud

Population (2016)
  - Total: 824
- Time zone: UTC+3:30 (IRST)

Shul (Persian: شول) (Note: Also romanized as Shool and Shūl) is a village in Hayat Davud Rural District of the Central District in Ganaveh County, Bushehr province, Iran.

== Demographics ==
=== Population ===
At the time of the 2006 National Census, the village's population was 1,225 in 268 households. The following census in 2011 counted 1,029 people in 268 households. The 2016 census measured the population of the village as 824 people in 251 households.
