= Kadai =

Kadai may refer to:

- Karahi, also known as kadai, a cooking utensil used mainly in Indian cooking; also the dishes cooked in it, including
  - Chicken karahi
  - Kadai paneer
- Kra–Dai languages, also known as Kadai or Tai–Kadai, a language family of Southeast Asia
- Gedai, Bushehr, also known as Kadā’ī and Kedā’ī, a village in Bushehr Province, Iran
