= Bahmanyar-e Gharbi =

Bahmanyar-e Gharbi بهمنيارغربي
- Village
- Location within Iran
- Coordinates: 29°42′48″N 50°31′50″E
- Country: Iran
- Province: Bushehr
- County: Ganaveh
- Bakhsh: Central
- Rural District: Hayat Davud

Population (2006)
  - Total: 91
- Time zone: UTC+3:30 (IRST)
  - Summer (DST): UTC+4:30 (IRDT)

Bahmanyar-e Gharbi (Persian: بهمنيارغربي, also Romanized as Bahmanyār-e Gharbī; also known as Bahman Yāri, Bahmanyārī-ye Gharbī, Bahmanyārī-ye Pā’īn, Bahmiyari Gharbi, and Behyārī-ye Gharbī) is a village in Hayat Davud Rural District, in the Central District of Ganaveh County, Bushehr Province, Iran. At the 2006 census, its population was 91, in 22 families.
