= Mal-e Khalifeh, Bushehr =

Village in Bushehr province, Iran

Mal-e Khalifeh Persian: مال خليفه
- Village
- Location within Iran
- Coordinates: 29°35′54″N 50°29′51″E
- Country: Iran
- Province: Bushehr
- County: Ganaveh
- District: Central
- Rural District: Hayat Davud

Population (2016)
  - Total: 2,463
- Time zone: UTC+3:30 (IRST)

Mal-e Khalifeh (Persian: مال خليفه) (Note: Also romanized as Mal Khalifeh, Māl-e Khalīfeh, and Māl-i-Khelifeh; also known as Khalīfeh) is a village in Hayat Davud Rural District of the Central District in Ganaveh County, Bushehr province, Iran.

== Demographics ==
=== Population ===
At the time of the 2006 National Census, the village's population was 889 in 196 households. The following census in 2011 counted 1,526 people in 388 households. The 2016 census measured the population of the village as 2,463 people in 680 households.
