= Bahmanyar-e Sharqi =

Village in Bushehr, Iran

Bahmanyar-e Sharqi بهمنيارشرقي
- Village
- Location within Iran
- Coordinates: 29°43′57″N 50°32′59″E
- Country: Iran
- Province: Bushehr
- County: Ganaveh
- Bakhsh: Central
- Rural District: Hayat Davud

Population (2006)
  - Total: 346
- Time zone: UTC+3:30 (IRST)
  - Summer (DST): UTC+4:30 (IRDT)

Bahmanyar-e Sharqi (Persian: بهمنيارشرقي, also Romanized as Bahmanyār-e Sharqī; also known as Bahman Yārī, Bahmanyārī-ye Bālā, Bahmanyārī-ye Sharqī, Bahmiyari Sharghi, and Behyārī-ye Sharqī) is a village in Hayat Davud Rural District, in the Central District of Ganaveh County, Bushehr Province, Iran. At the 2006 census, its population was 346, in 89 families.
