= Postage stamps of Bushire under British occupation =

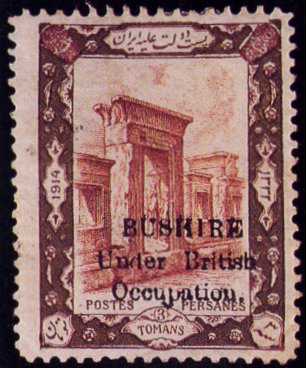
A 1915 stamp of Bushire under British occupation

Bushehr or Bushire is a city on the southwestern coast of Iran, on the Persian Gulf. It is the chief seaport of the country and the administrative centre of Bushehr Province.

== History ==
Bushire was used as a base by the British Royal Navy in the late 18th century. In the 19th century, Bushehr became an important commercial port. It was occupied by British forces in 1856, during the Anglo-Persian War of 1856–1857. Bushehr surrendered to the British on 9 December 1856. It was occupied again by the British in 1915, the second time due to German intrigue, most notably by Wilhelm Wassmuss and Rais Ali Delvari.

== Postage stamps ==
Bushire has long been of interest to stamp collectors, since, during their 1915 occupation, the British issued postage stamps. The occupation lasted from 8 August to 16 October, when it was terminated by agreement with the Persian government. The first stamps issued were overprints on Persian stamps of 1911 reading BUSHIRE / Under British / Occupation., issued on 15 August. The same overprint was applied in September, to the series of Persian stamps issued in 1915. All of these overprints are uncommon, the cheapest costing US$25 and the rarer varieties ranging up to US$6,000. As might be expected, forgeries have appeared.

== Sources ==
- Stanley Gibbons: various catalogues
- AskPhil – Glossary of Stamp Collecting Terms
- Encyclopaedia of Postal History
- Rossiter, Stuart & John Flower. The Stamp Atlas. London: Macdonald, 1986, p. 331. ISBN 0-356-10862-7

== See also ==
- Bushehr
- Postage stamps and postal history of Iran
- Rais Ali Delvari
