= Mohammad Salehi, Bushehr =

Village in Bushehr province, Iran

Mohammad Salehi Persian: محمد صالحي
- Village
- Location within Iran
- Coordinates: 29°38′39″N 50°36′41″E
- Country: Iran
- Province: Bushehr
- County: Ganaveh
- District: Central
- Rural District: Hayat Davud

Population (2016)
  - Total: 1,515
- Time zone: UTC+3:30 (IRST)

Mohammad Salehi (Persian: محمد صالحي) (Note: Also romanized as Moḩammad Şāleḩī; also known as Mehmad Sādī, Muhammad Sa-adi, Muhammad Sa‘aīd, and Muhammad Sālehī) is a village in, and the capital of, Hayat Davud Rural District in the Central District of Ganaveh County, Bushehr province, Iran.

== Demographics ==
=== Population ===
At the time of the 2006 National Census, the village's population was 1,374 in 289 households. The following census in 2011 counted 1,561 people in 391 households. The 2016 census measured the population of the village as 1,515 people in 409 households.
