= Rais Ali Dilavari Dam =

Dam in Shabankareh, Bushehr, Iran

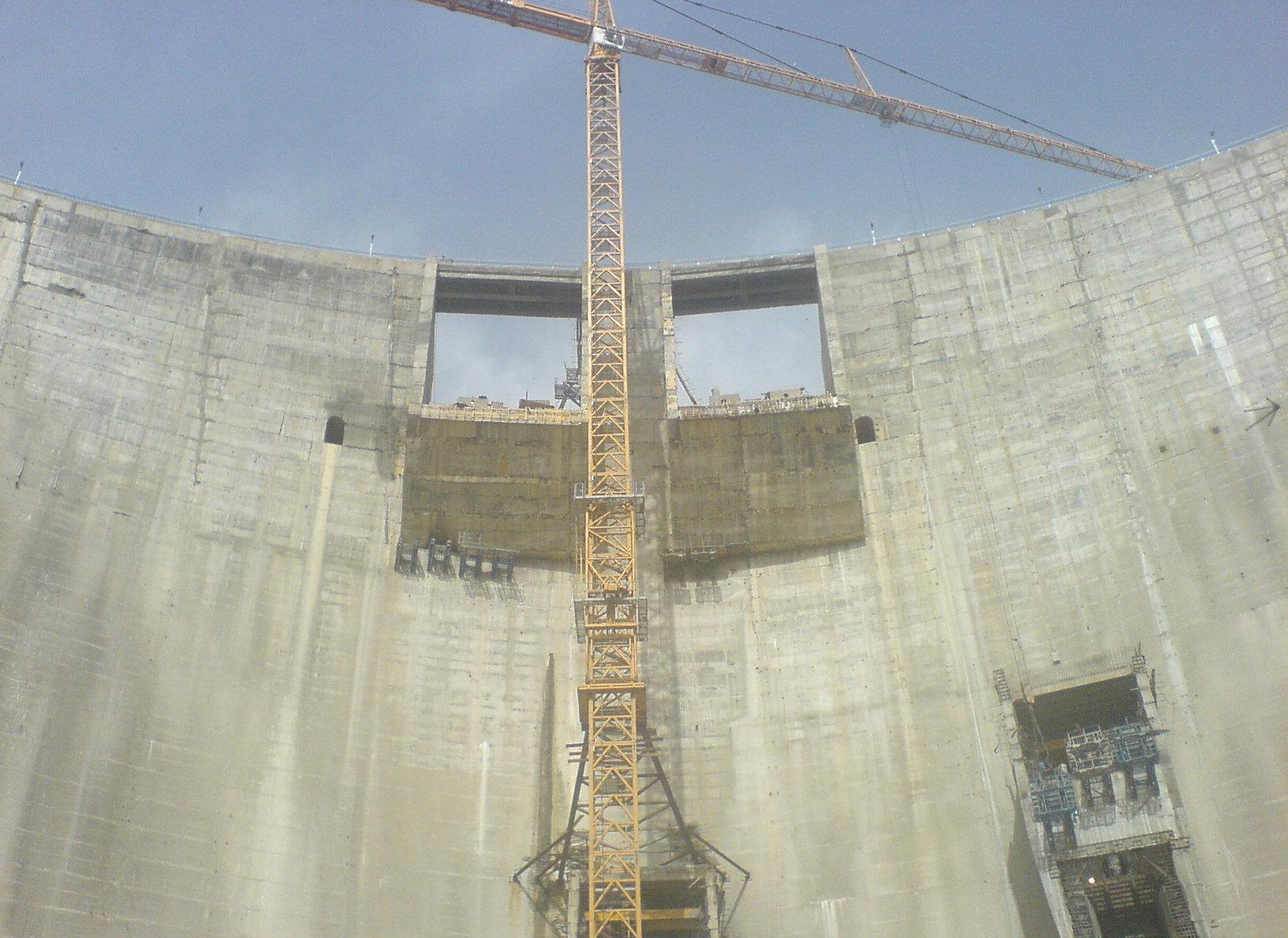
- Construction of the Rais Ali Dilavari Dam

- Location within Iran
- Country: Iran
- Location: Bushehr Province
- Coordinates: 29.6248°N 51.0876°E

Power Station
- Installed capacity: 70 MW

Rais Ali Dilavari Dam is a hydroelectric dam in Iran with an installed electricity generating capability of 70 MW. It is situated in Shabankareh, Bushehr Province.

== See also ==
- Rais Ali Delvari
- List of power stations in Iran
