= Postage stamps and postal history of Iran =

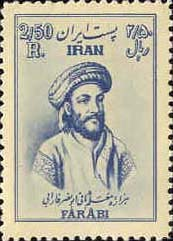
A 1950 stamp from Iran

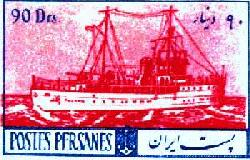
1950s era Iranian postage stamp illustrating the Iranian warship Palang (Leopard) sunk while moored at an Abadan pier, by the Royal Navy during a surprise attack on Iran, August 1941

This is a survey of the postage stamps and postal history of Iran.

== Pre-stamp era ==
In the pre-stamp era an ancient system of couriers operated throughout the Persian empire. At a very early stage, these couriers used the ancient route from Babylon to Kermanshah, up to Hamadan—the classic Ecbatana—touching Tsagros in transit. This royal route changed in the course of time. According to ancient sources like Herodotus and Xenophon, Cyrus, King of Persia paid close attention to the communication network. From Xenophon we learn that Cyrus had stations and stables built to facilitate the couriers' missions and their efficient delivery of messages from the central power to the provinces. It was not a postal service as we know it today and it was not accessible to everyone.

== Indian postal agencies ==
In 1864 British colonial post offices using India's postage stamps were opened in Muscat and Bushire. These two postal outlets proved very successful and in 1867, Anglo-Indian post offices were opened in Bandar Abbas, and Linga. In the course of time a total of 13 Indian Post Offices operated in Iran. Following a 1922 agreement between India and Iran, on 30 March 1923 all Indian postal facilities in Iran were closed, except for two exchange bureaux in Duzdab and Mirjawa that continued to function for a few more years.

== Russian post offices ==
Russian post offices operated in 1908–1918 in northern Persia using stamps of Russia.

== First stamps ==
The modern era of postal service in Iran started in 1851 with a postal reform that had no immediate effects. The success of the Anglo-Indian postal operations combined with the positive reports about postal reforms in Europe and throughout the British Empire generated a renewed interest about postal communications and telegraphy in Naser al-Din, the Shah who reigned from 1848 to 1896. In 1865 he sent a delegation to Paris to liaise with the French Ministry of Posts & Telecommunications. The news of the Iranian mission got around and a private businessman by the name of A.M. Riester submitted essays for Iranian stamps featuring a lion and a rising sun behind it, set in an oval inner frame, part of an ornamentally rich frame. Months went by and Riester decided to contact Teheran, but he was chided for taking the liberty of using national symbols for unsolicited stamps. Meanwhile, the Iranian mission had opted for essays featuring a similar design prepared by Albert Barre. These essays caught the attention of top bureaucrats and eventually that of the Shah; as a result, in 1868 imperforate stamps with basically the same design of the Barre essays were printed in Teheran in quantities varying from 3,000 to 8,000 and issued for postal use in four denominations: 1 shahi violet; 2 shais green. 4 shais blue; and 8 shais red. They have been nicknamed the Bagheri stamps, possibly in reference to the person who printed or designed them. There was no hand-stamp or date-stamp in use to cancel these stamps and their circulation and use was relatively modest. In fact, not many letters are recorded, and because of the lack of any cancelling device, it is rather problematic to determine their genuine postal use simply because it is easy to exponentially increase the value of an un-cancelled letter by just adding an adhesive or two on to it.

== See also ==
- Iran Post
- Postage stamps of Bushire under British occupation
