= Rais-Ali Delvari =

Iranian military leader (1882–1915)

- Born: 1882; Delvar, Qajar Iran
- Died: 2 September 1915 (aged 33) Tangak Safar (Bushehr)
- Buried: Wadi-us-Salaam, Najaf, Iraq
- Commands: Leader of Tangestan forces
- Conflicts: World War I, (United Kingdom and Iran)
- Spouse: Banu Kheiri
- Children: AbdolHosein (Bahador Shahidi)

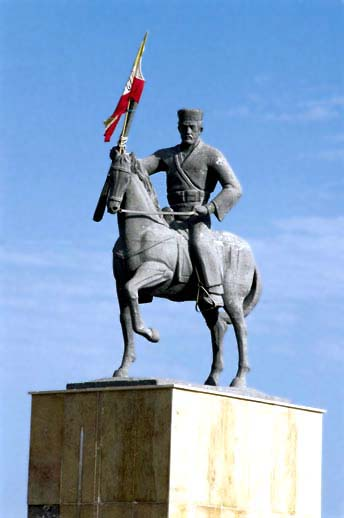
Statue of Rais Ali Delvari in Bushehr

Rais-Ali Delvari (Persian: رئیسعلی دلواری) was an Iranian military leader. He is remembered as a national hero in Iran who organized popular resistance against British forces after the invasion of Iran in 1915.

Rais Ali was born in 1882 in the port city of Bushehr. After the occupation of Bushehr in 1915, British expeditionary forces took over Delvar. His uprising in Tangestan lasted for nearly seven years, attempting to secure the independence of Iran.

Rais Ali Delvari was killed on 2 September 1915, at the age of 33.

His house, located in Delvar, near Bushehr, has been transformed into an ethnological museum. Some of his personal items and historic documents are exhibited in this museum, along with various types of guns and horse caparisoning.

== Background ==
=== Iranian background ===
In World War I, Iran was neutral. In reality, Persian forces were affected by the rivalry between the Allied Powers and the Central Powers and took sides based on the conditions. Western interest in Persia was based on its significant oil reserve and its strategic situation between Afghanistan and the warring Ottoman, Russian, and British empires. Persia was divided into northern and southern spheres of influence under the Anglo-Russian Treaty of 1907. The treaty defined their respective spheres of influence in Iran and Afghanistan and provided a counterweight to German influence. This treaty was widely viewed by Iranians as having made the nation into little more than a British and Russian protectorate, so during the First World War, many local rebellions occurred in Iran against the British and Russian forces participating in war against the Central Powers. In Northern Iran, the Jangal movement was the main local force operating against the British and Russians, and in Southern Iran, Lurs (Boyer Ahmadi), Tangistani and Laristani tribes were the main force which fought against the British Empire. In both movements, the Persian Central Government Gendarmerie supported the rebels (See Persian Campaign).

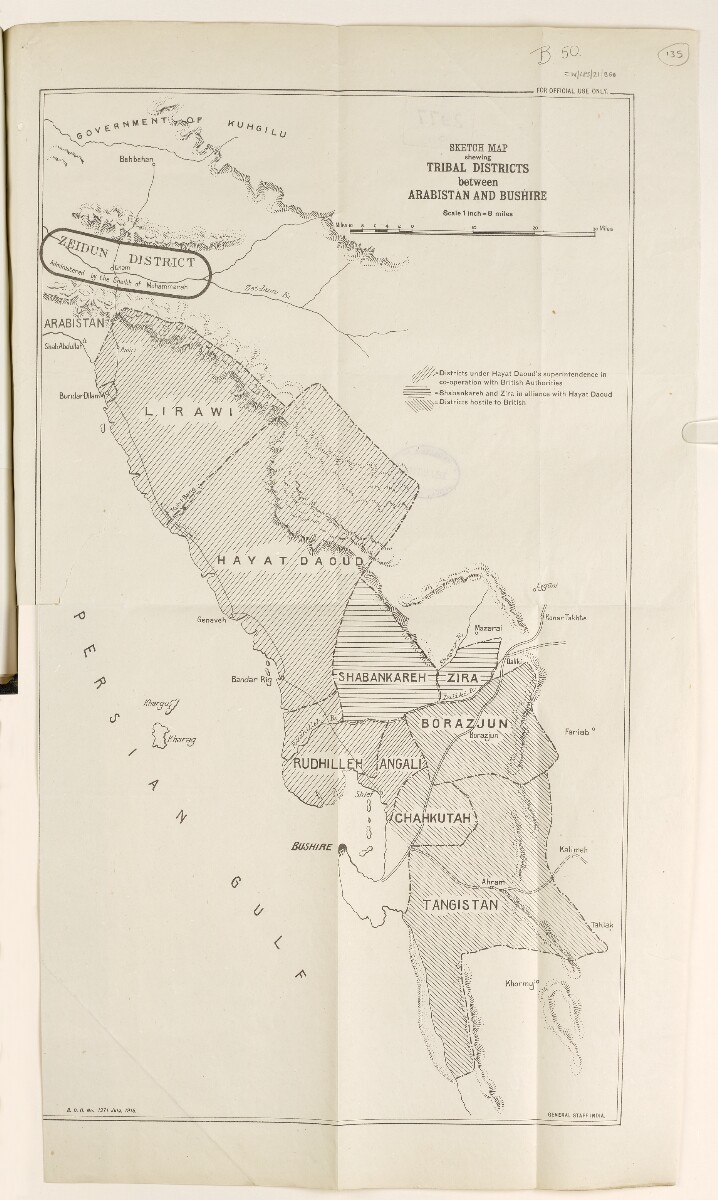
Map of the Bushehr region showing tribal districts and their political allegiances, 1915.

=== German rule ===
Germany established their Intelligence Bureau for the East on the eve of World War I, dedicated to promoting and sustaining subversive and nationalist agitations in British India and the Persian and Egyptian satellite states. The bureau was involved in intelligence and subversive missions to Persia and Afghanistan to dismantle the Anglo-Russian Entente. The bureau's operations in Persia were led by Wilhelm Wassmuss. The Germans hoped to remove Persia from the British and Russian sphere of influence and to further create a wedge between Russia and the British, eventually leading to an invasion of British India by locally organized armies.

== Uprising ==
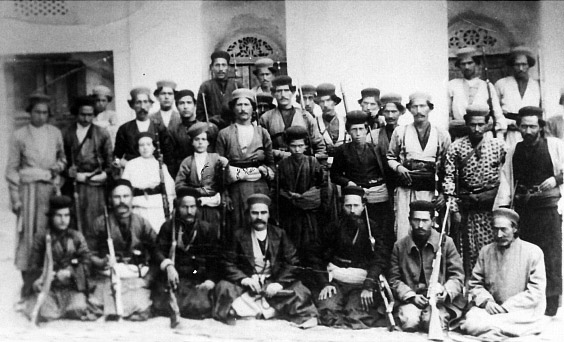
Rais Ali Delvari and other fighters

During first years of World War I, Rais Ali and Wassmuss were busy formulating a general anti-British uprising in Persia. On 12 July 1915, Rais Ali and Tangestani's attacked the British residency in Bushehr, but they were repulsed.

On 8 August 1915, British forces occupied Bushehr with five hundred British Indian Army cavalrymen and on 14 September removed Mokhber-al-Saltana from Shiraz and installed Habib-Allah Qawām-al-Molk as acting governor of Fars province. Between August and October 1915, Qawām-al-Molk received financial support from the British. But in late December al-Molk was expelled from Shiraz by pro-German officers in the Iranian gendarmerie and the radical Democrat Party members who occupied the city and confiscated British-owned assets. Five days later Royal Navy warships bombarded the headquarters of the Tangestanis tribal at Dilbar; and on 3 and 9 September the British Indian Army repulsed several Tangistani raids, in these clashes, Rais Ali was killed in action. Pro-British Iranian tribes subsequently pushed back Tangestani forces into the hinterland. At the end, local tribal leaders murdered the British vice consul (a Persian) in Shiraz.

== Aftermath ==
On 26 June 1916 an anti-British uprising broke out in Shiraz, but was suppressed the next day. The fragile British control over Fārs was disrupted in May 1918 when Ṣawlat-al-Dawla, leading the Qashqais and other pro-German tribal forces from Kazerun, Dashti, Dashtestan and Tangestan, embarked upon a war against the British. Eventually, Ṣawlat-al-Dawla's uprising subsided due to a combination of an influenze outbreak and British pressure. In late 1920 Mohammad Mossadegh, the new governor-general of Fārs, reinstated Ṣawlat-al-Dawla to the office of īlḵānī. The South Persia Rifles ended its activities following the Iranian coup of 1921, which was followed by the formation of a modern army in Persia and the eventual suppression of tribal rebels.

== Legacy ==
According to Iranian Minister of Islamic Culture and Guidance, the Islamic Republic of Iran has designated 3 September as day of combat against British colonialism in Iran. The day is devoted to sacrifices of Rais Ali Delvari, and will be registered in official calendars. The Rais Ali Dilavari Dam, is named after this person.

== See also ==
- Postage stamps of Bushire under British occupation
- Wilhelm Wassmuss
- Persian campaign (World War I)
- Jungle Movement of Gilan
- Mohammad Taqi Pessian
- Khalou Hossein Bord Khuni Dashti
