= Rud-e Shur, Hormozgan =

Rud-e Shur رودشور
- Village
- Location within Iran
- Coordinates: 27°41′43″N 56°19′30″E
- Country: Iran
- Province: Hormozgan
- County: Bandar Abbas
- Bakhsh: Fin
- Rural District: Siyahu

Population (2006)
  - Total: 150
- Time zone: UTC+3:30 (IRST)
  - Summer (DST): UTC+4:30 (IRDT)

Rud-e Shur (Persian: رودشور, also Romanized as Rūd-e Shūr) is a village in Siyahu Rural District, Fin District, Bandar Abbas County, Hormozgan Province, Iran. At the 2006 census, its population was 150, with 31 families.
