= Wadi-us-Salaam =

Islamic cemetery in Najaf, Iraq

Wadi-us-Salaam cemetery
- وادي السلام (Valley of Peace)
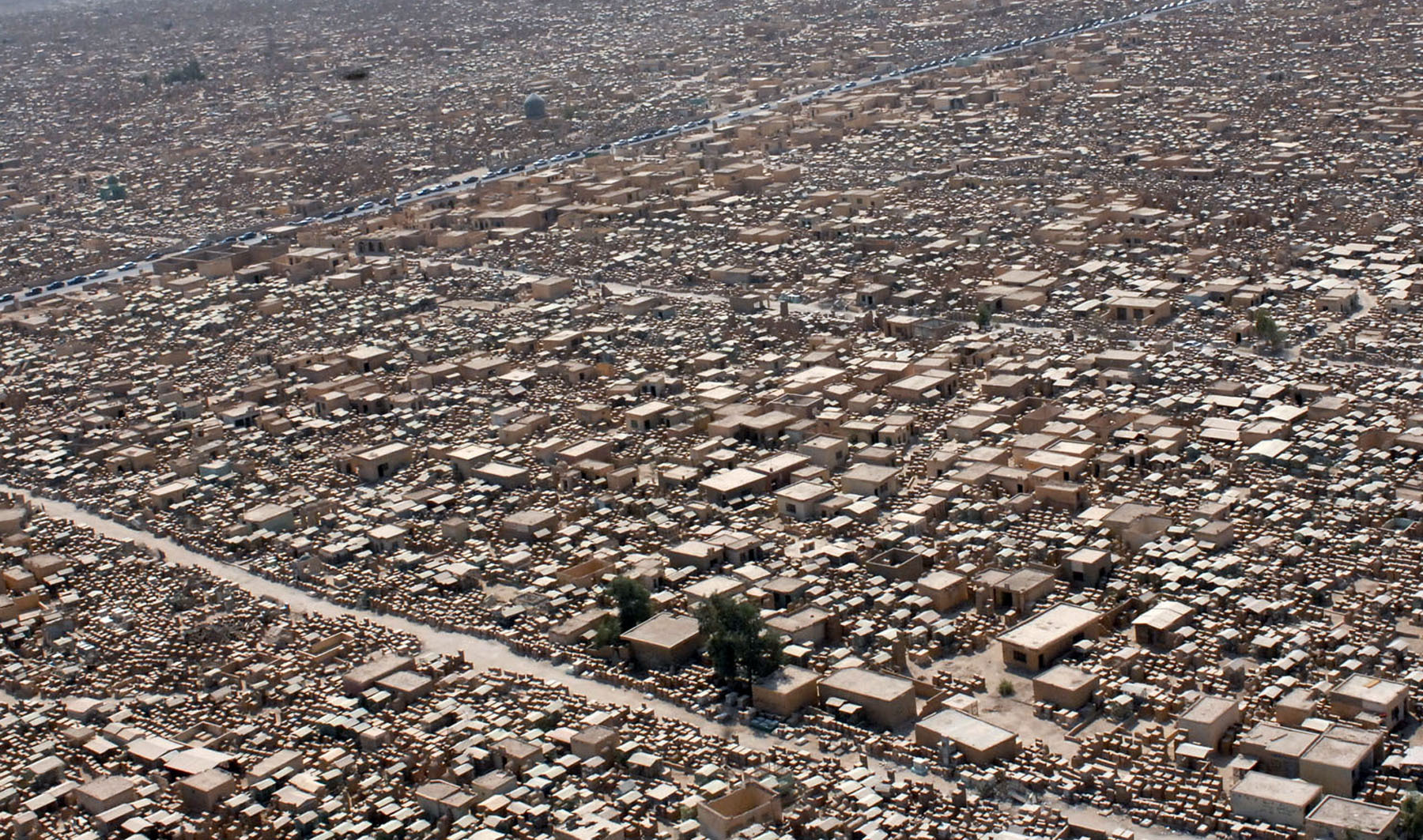
- Aerial photograph of most of the whole cemetery.

- Location within Iraq

Details
- Location: 2894+CR4, Najaf, Najaf Governorate, Iraq
- Country: Iraq
- Coordinates: 32°01′02″N 44°17′51″E

Wadi-us-Salaam (Note: Arabic: وادي السلام, romanized: Wādī al-Salām, Arabic pronunciation: [ˈwaːdi‿s.saˈlaːm], lit. 'Valley of Peace') is an Islamic cemetery, located in the holy city of Najaf, Iraq. It is the largest cemetery in the world. The cemetery covers 1,485.5 acres (601.16 ha; 6.01 km^{2}; 2.32 sq mi) and contains more than 6 million bodies. It also attracts millions of pilgrims annually.

The cemetery is located near the shrine of Ali ibn Abi Talib, the fourth Islamic Caliph, as well as the first Shia Imam. Thus, many Shi'ites in Iraq request that they be buried in this cemetery. As a result of improved transportation methods, Shi'ites from across the globe are (or seek to be) buried in the cemetery. Modern burials are interred inside shared crypts.

== Shi'ite traditions about the cemetery ==
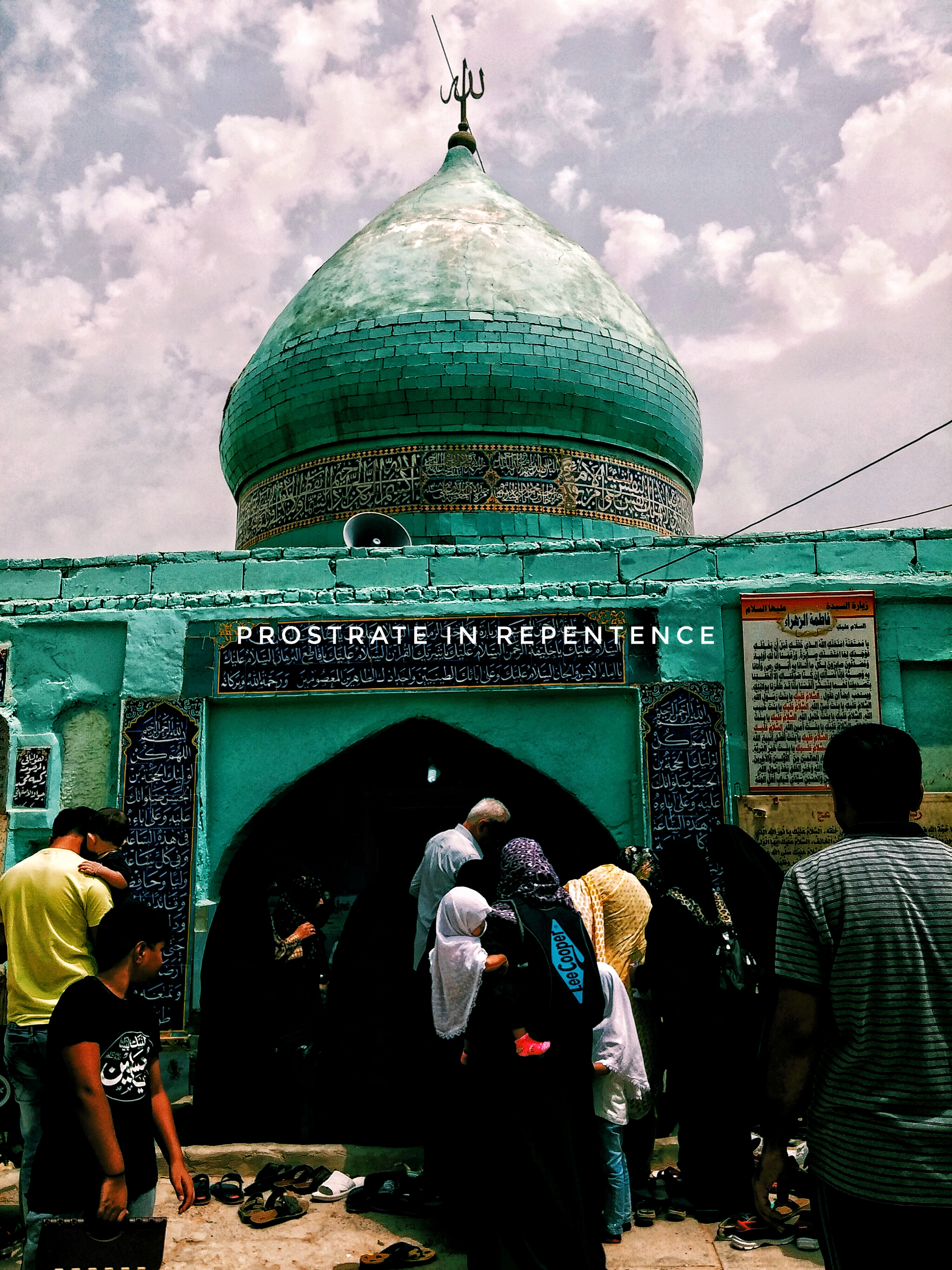
The shrine built in remembrance of the 12th Imam, known as "Maqam al-Mahdi"

Shi'ite tradition holds that Abraham bought land in Wadi-us-Salaam, and that Ali had said the Wadi Al-Salaam was a part of heaven. Shia also widely believe that Ali has the power to intercede for the deceased—lessening their suffering—during the passage of their soul from the worldly life and if they are buried there, they will be raised from the dead on judgment day with their spiritual leader. Additionally, it is believed that prophets Hud and Salih are buried here, according to some narrations.

Shi'ites are encouraged to bury their dead at the location through religious edicts and the cemetery's expansion is also seen as being a result of Shi'isms "more permissive attitude than Sunnism with regard to the commemoration of the dead and the erection of mausoleums."

=== Shi'ite funerary rituals ===
Religious rituals practiced at Wadi-us-Salaam before burial include:

1. Washing the body and wrapping it at the cemetery.
2. Conducting funeral prayers at the adjacent shrine of Ali.
3. Carrying the freshly wrapped corpse around the shrine, in an act similar to that of Tawaf, before it is transported to the cemetery.
4. Reciting some Qur'anic verses at the cemetery for the deceased.

== History ==
Daily burials have been on going for over 1,400 years and the site is on the Tentative List of UNESCO's World Heritage sites. Burials in Najaf have been documented as early as the Parthian and Sassanid eras and ancient Mesopotamian cities often had similar cemeteries, where there was an accumulation of tombs.

Wadi-us-Salaam in Najaf was once a holy cemetery for Jews and was then called Baniqia, which could be the first recorded name for the area. The name Baniqia also was found in some texts which state that Abraham once visited and stayed in this village before continuing his journey from Mesopotamia to the Levant.

The cemetery saw heavy fighting during the 2004 Battle of Najaf. It is estimated that during the Iraq War, about 200 to 250 corpses were buried there daily; however, in 2010 this number had decreased to less than 100. Approximately 50,000 new bodies are interred in the cemetery annually from across the globe. This figure is an increase on the approximately 20,000 bodies, primarily from Iran, that used to be interred annually in the early 20th century. Most Iraqi and many Iranian Shi'ites have a relative buried in the cemetery.

As of 2014—coinciding with conflict against ISIL—it has been reported that burial plots are running out, resulting in many being stolen, illegally resold or improvised. According to one gravedigger: "I've never had it so busy. Not even after 2003 or 2006 [the height of Iraq's civil war]."

== Important monuments ==
=== Tombs of the Grand Ayatollahs ===
The Grand Ayatollah, Muhammad Baqir al-Sadr, is buried in this cemetery. His successor, Muhammad-Sadiq al-Sadr, is also buried there, and his grave is one of the most visited tombs in the cemetery.

=== Shrine of Prophet Hud and Salih ===
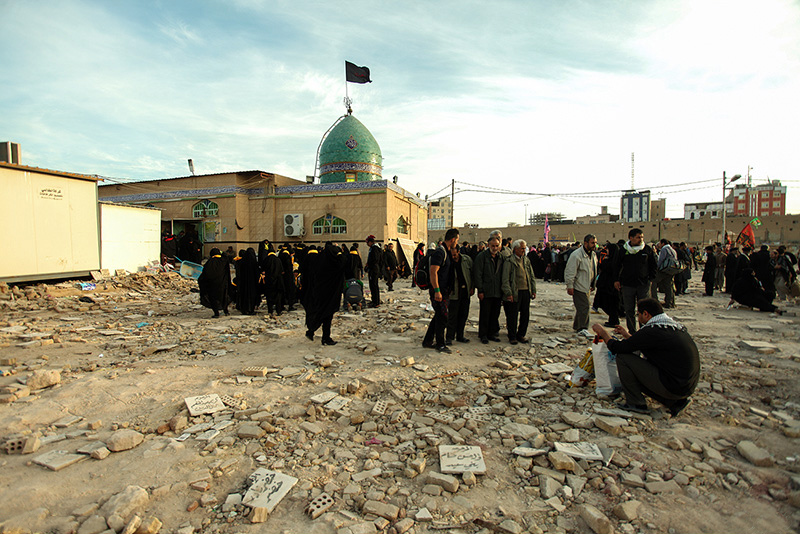
Pilgrims gathered outside the shrine of the Prophets Hud and Salih

First built in the 18th century under request of Moḥammad Mahdī Baḥr al-ʿUlūm over the purported tombs of Hud and Salih based on Shi'ite narrations. It was restored in the years 1918 to 1919 after the British desecrated it in 1917. A full new reconstruction was started in 2018.

=== Site of Imam al-Mahdi ===
Site dedicated to Imam al-Mahdi.

=== Site of Imam Ja'far al-Sadiq ===
Site dedicated to Imam Ja'far al-Sadiq.

== Prominent burials ==
- Rais Ali Delvari
- Khalou Hossein Bord Khuni Dashti
- Sayed Ali Qadhi Tabatabaei
- Abdul Hosein Amini
- Leyla Qasim
- Mirza Yahya Khoyi
- Amina al-Sadr
- Grand Ayatollah Muhammad Sadiq al-Sadr
- Grand Ayatollah Muhammad Baqir al-Sadr
- Hussain Qoli Khan Feyli, Vāli/Wāli of Posht-e-Kuh (modern day Ilam, Iran), and father of the last Vāli of Posht-e-Kuh Gholam Reza Khan.
- Other religious figures
