= Mal-e Mahmud, Fars =

Mal-e Mahmud مال محمود
- Village
- Location within Iran
- Coordinates: 30°07′37″N 51°25′46″E
- Country: Iran
- Province: Fars
- County: Mamasani
- Bakhsh: Central
- Rural District: Bakesh-e Do

Population (2006)
  - Total: 718
- Time zone: UTC+3:30 (IRST)
  - Summer (DST): UTC+4:30 (IRDT)

Mal-e Mahmud (Persian: مال محمود, also Romanized as Māl-e Maḩmūd and Māl Maḩmūd) is a village in Bakesh-e Do Rural District, in the Central District of Mamasani County, Fars province, Iran. At the 2006 census, its population was 718, in 147 families.
