= Bandar Rig =

City in Bushehr province, Iran

Bandar-e Rig Persian: بندر ريگ
- City
- Location within Iran
- Coordinates: 29°29′14″N 50°37′51″E
- Country: Iran
- Province: Bushehr
- County: Ganaveh
- District: Rig

Population (2016)
  - Total: 6,252
- Time zone: UTC+3:30 (IRST)

Bandar Rig (Persian: بندرريگ) (Note: Also romanized as Bandar Rīg and Bandar-e Rīg; also known as Rig) is a city in, and the capital of, Rig District in Ganaveh County of Bushehr province, Iran.

== Demographics ==
=== Population ===
At the time of the 2006 National Census, the city's population was 5,257 in 1,169 households. The following census in 2011 counted 5,619 people in 1,421 households. The 2016 census measured the population of the city as 6,252 people in 1,833 households.
