= Shareef Sarhan =

Palestinian artist, photographer, designer (born 1976)

- Born: Wael Shareef Sarhan; 25 November 1976 (age 49); Gaza City, Palestine
- Occupations: Photographer, photojournalist, visual artist, designer
- Years active: 1998–present
- Known for: Photography, installation art, sculpture, multimedia art

Shareef Sarhan (born 1976) is a Palestinian photographer, multidisciplinary visual artist, and designer. He is a founding member of Shababeek for Contemporary Art (Windows From Gaza); and has published two books, Gaza War (2007), and Gaza Lives (2012).

== Early life ==
Shareef Sarhan was born on 25 November 1976, in Gaza City, Palestine.

Sarhan was enrolled in the Darat al Funun (English: Dara Academy of Jordanian Arts) summer academy that was hosted from 1999 to 2003, with Marwan Kassab-Bachi (1934–2016) serving as the director. He graduated in 2001 from the International Correspondence School (ICS) of Scranton, Pennsylvania, US.

== Career ==
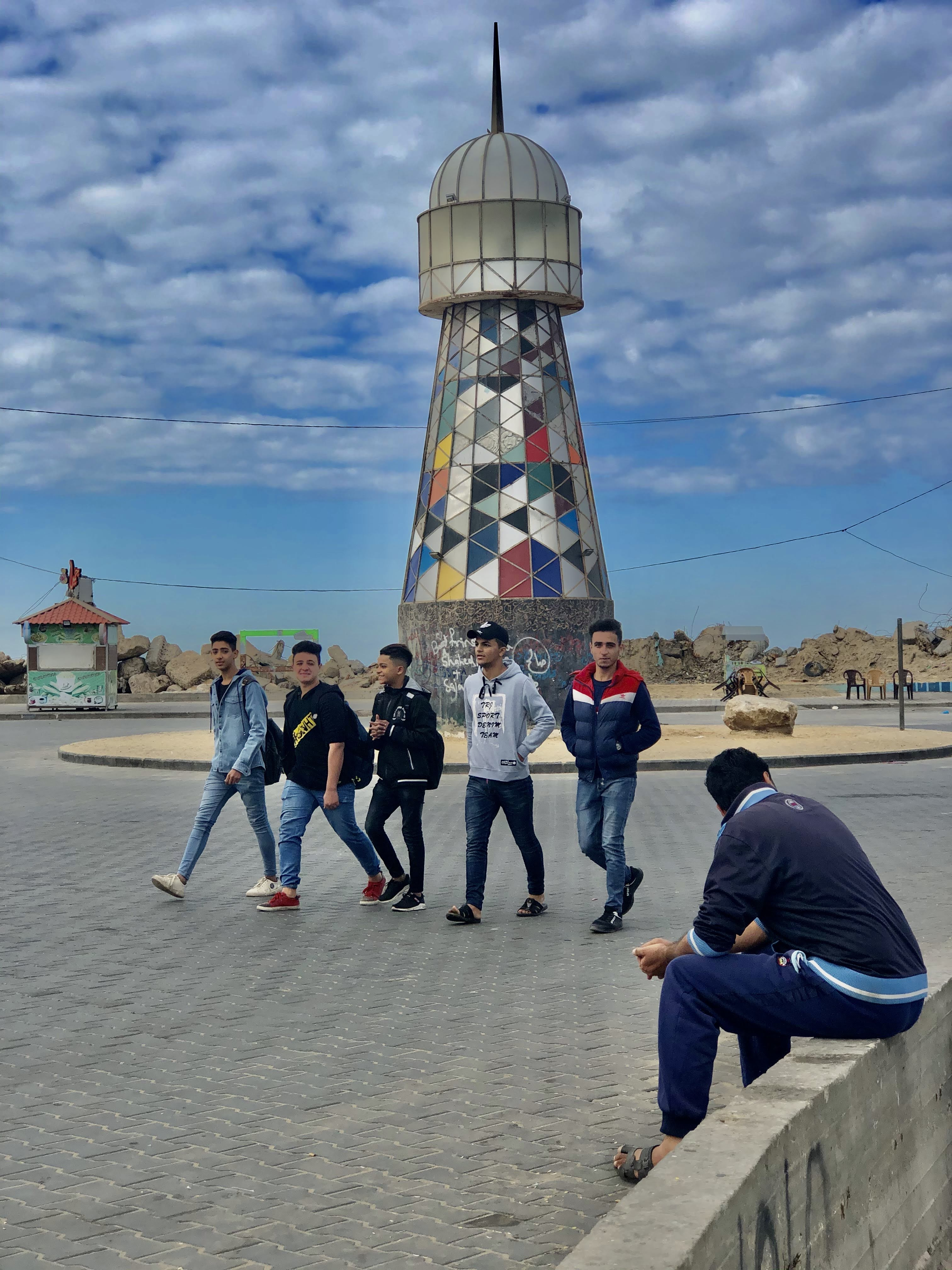
The Lighthouse of Gaza (2016) by Sarhan

Sarhan began photography work in 1998, and mostly worked as a freelance photographer for international organizations. He has taken photographs of closed off areas within Palestine, and of the ongoing conflict.

Some of his notable visual artworks include The Lighthouse of Gaza (2016), a public sculpture and installation; Clutter re-Making (2018), a sculptural installation; and Soldiers and the Concrete Base, multimedia (2019–2021).

In the summer of 2014, and during the course of the 51 days of Israeli offensive against Gaza, Sarhan created a series of 51 photographs related to the event. Sarhan started visiting factories and workshops in Gaza in 2017 to collected discarded materials such as aluminum. He would take the discarded materials and created art in the form of Arabic letters in bright colors.

Sarhan is one of the founding members of Shababeek for Contemporary Art (Windows From Gaza), located on the Gaza Strip. Shababeek grew to some 250 members in 2019. The Shababeek for Contemporary Art building was located across from the Al-Shifa Hospital, and in April 2024 during the Gaza war, the building was destroyed by Israel. It was the last contemporary artist space in Gaza at the time. The Lighthouse of Gaza was also destroyed during the war. Sarhan and his family evacuated to France where in 2026 he recreated the lighthouse under the title Re-Lighthouse.

Sarhan won the Bronze Award (2010) at the Festival of Arab Photographers Europe in Berlin, Germany. He is a member of the Palestinian Artists Association. Sarhan was featured in a Deutsche Welle (DW) documentary titled, Preserving Gaza's Photographic History (2020), directed by Tania Krämer.

== See also ==
- List of Palestinian artists
