= Khalou Hossein Bord Khuni Dashti =

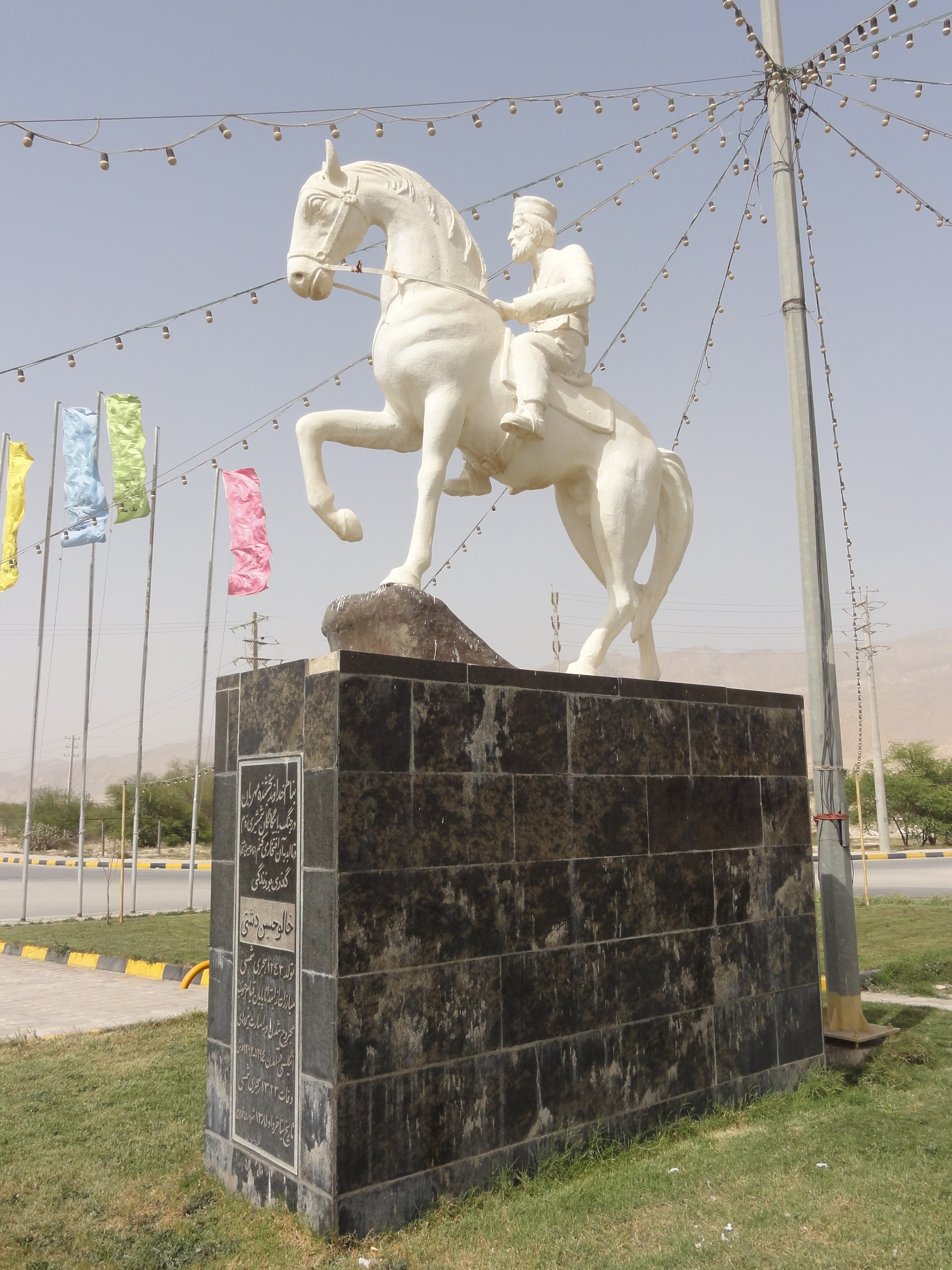
Statue of Khalou Hossein in Khormoj.

Khaloo Hossein Bord khuni Dashti (1868–1946) who people of Bord Khun (Bushehr Province) fought British Forces c. 1915 in south of Iran (in World War I).

== See also ==
- Rais Ali Delvari
- Wilhelm Wassmuss
- Persian Campaign
