= Shababeek for Contemporary Art =

Museum in Gaza City, Palestine

Coordinates: 31.526157°N 34.442973°E

Shababeek for Contemporary Art (Arabic: شبابيك للّفن المعاصر) was a nonprofit visual arts centre and gallery space in Gaza City, Palestine. It served as a major hub for Palestinian contemporary art from its formal establishment in 2009 until its destruction in 2024.

== History ==
The initiative was launched in the early 2000s by the artists Shareef Sarhan, Basel El Maqosui, and Majed Shala, who organised informal exhibitions and workshops in Gaza. The group formally founded Shababeek in 2009, when it rented a house in Gaza City and converted it into a permanent gallery and community space.

Over time, Shababeek expanded its programming to include exhibitions, talks and art‐focused mental health programming for children. It also worked under difficult conditions—such as limited access to art supplies due to blockades, restrictions, and recurrent conflict. In 2018 Shababeek received funding from the Swedish government via the Al-Qattan Foundation, which enabled programme expansion, including launching Gaza's first artist residency programme.

Shababeek functioned as one of the few dedicated visual arts institutions in Gaza. It supported more than 500 artists over its lifespan and served as a platform for both established and emerging practitioners. The centre also acted as a repository for contemporary Palestinian art, reportedly housing more than 20,000 works, including paintings, sculptures, photographs, and prints.

== Destruction ==
During a two-week Israeli military operation around Al-Shifa Hospital in March and April 2024, the building housing Shababeek was destroyed. Reports indicated that the structure was levelled and its collections largely lost. The destruction removed one of the last functioning art centres in Gaza, eliminating an important space for exhibition, archiving, and community engagement. An estimated 1,000 works of art were destroyed.

One of the co-founders, El Maqosui, was displaced to Rafah and set up a "Little Shababeek" in his tent to host art workshops for women and children. Sarhan was in Turkey at the start of the war and unable to return. Shala was displaced to Deir al-Balah.

== See also ==
- Destruction of cultural heritage during the Gaza war
