= Amiriyeh Mansion =

Historic building in Bushehr, Iran

Coordinates: 28.9220°N 50.8331°E

- عمارت امیریه
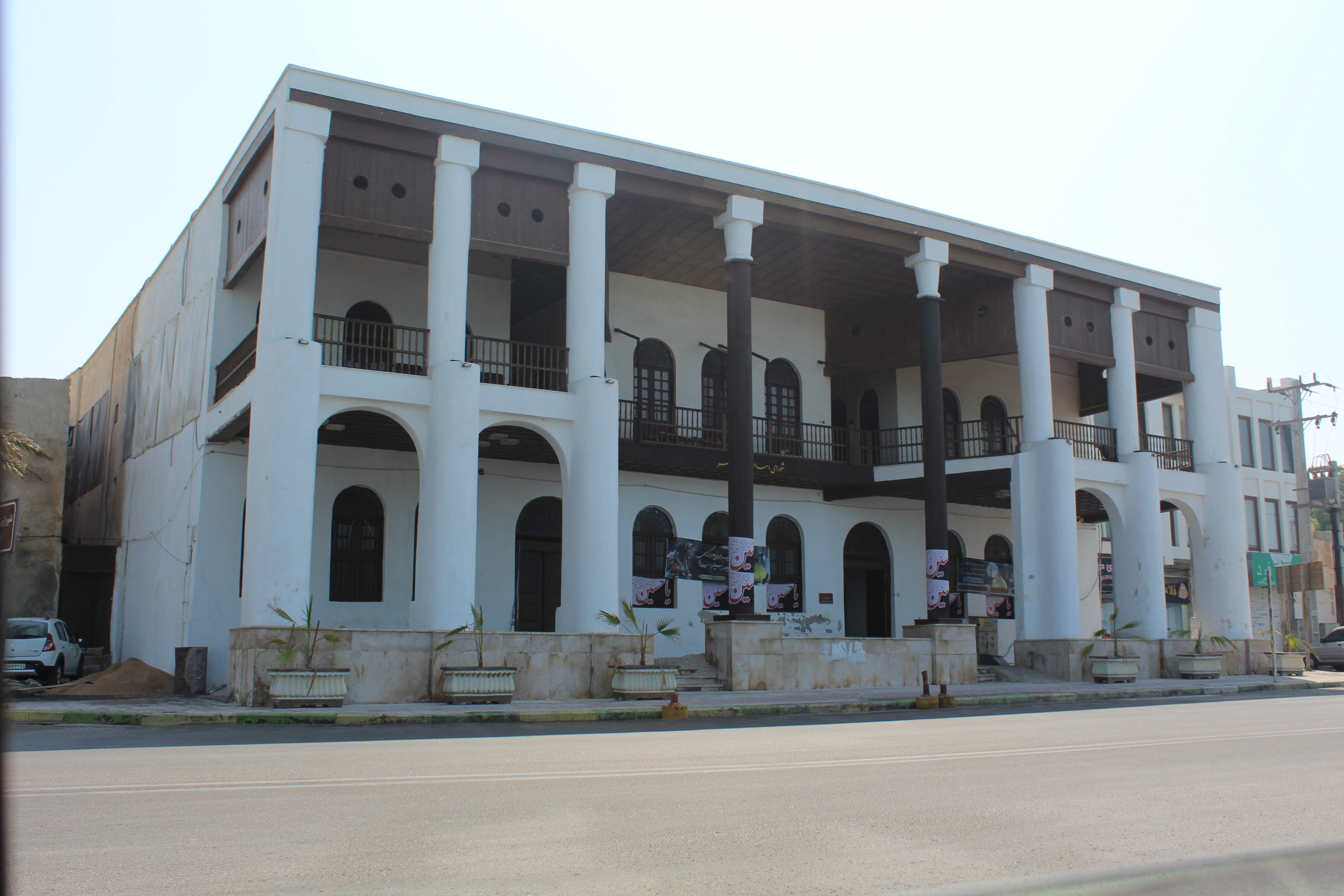
- Interactive map of the Amiriyeh Mansion area

General information
- Status: Museum, Governmental building
- Type: Mansion
- Location: Bushehr, Iran
- Current tenants: City Council of Bushehr

Amiriyeh Mansion (Persian: عمارت امیریه) is a historic building constructed during the Qajar era. It is located on Saheli street, Persian Gulf park, Kooti district, Bushehr, Iran. It was listed as a National work of Iran with record number 2319 on 9 May 1999.

Amiriyeh Mansion is a two-storey building with a central courtyard. The front porch has eight columns and two doorways.
