= Hayat Davud Rural District =

Rural district in Bushehr province, Iran

Hayat Davud Rural District Persian: دهستان حيات داود
- Rural District
- Location within Iran
- Coordinates: 29°43′N 50°35′E
- Country: Iran
- Province: Bushehr
- County: Ganaveh
- District: Central
- Established: 1986
- Capital: Mohammad Salehi

Population (2016)
  - Total: 15,177
- Time zone: UTC+3:30 (IRST)

Hayat Davud Rural District (Persian: دهستان حيات داود) is in the Central District of Ganaveh County, Bushehr province, Iran. Its capital is the village of Mohammad Salehi. The region was historically inhabited by the Hayat-Dawudi.

== Demographics ==
=== Population ===
At the time of the 2006 National Census, the rural district's population was 10,819 in 2,392 households. There were 12,920 inhabitants in 3,261 households at the following census of 2011. The 2016 census measured the population of the rural district as 15,177 in 4,204 households. The most populous of its 40 villages was Mal-e Qayid, with 4,564 people.

=== Other villages in the rural district ===
- Abbasi
- Chah Bordi
- Mal-e Khalifeh
- Sarbast
- Shul
