= Wilhelm Wassmuss =

German diplomat and spy (1880–1931)

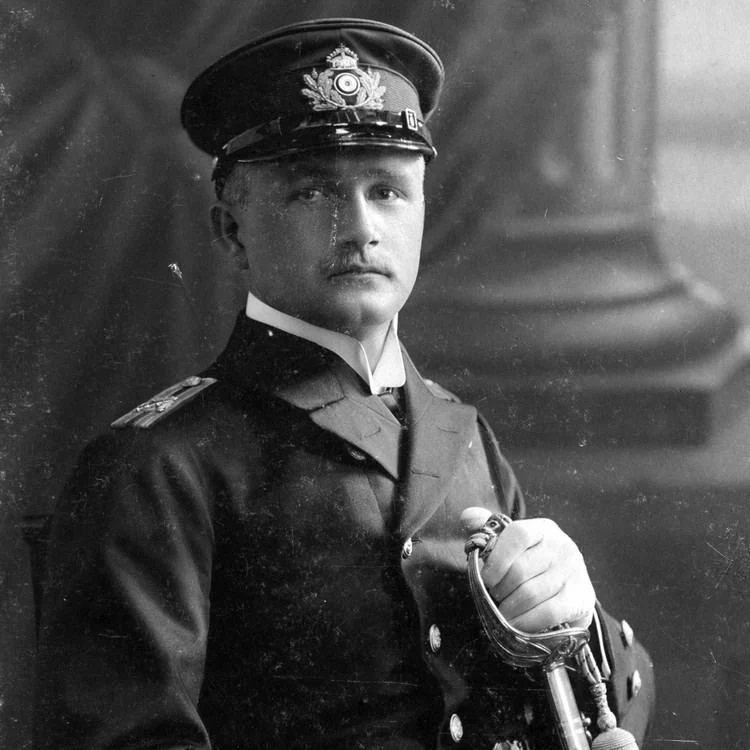
- Wassmuss in German military uniform
- Born: Wilhelm Wassmuss; 14 February 1880; Ohlendorf, Province of Hanover, Kingdom of Prussia, German Empire
- Died: 29 November 1931 (aged 51); Berlin, Province of Brandenburg, Free State of Prussia, Weimar Republic
- Espionage activity
- Allegiance: German Empire
- Service years: 1906–1918

Wilhelm Wassmuss (14 February 1880 – 29 November 1931; German spelling: Waßmuß) was a German diplomat and spy who operated in Persia, as well as taking part in the Niedermayer–Hentig Expedition, known as "Wassmuss of Persia". According to British versions of history, he "attempted to foment trouble for the British" in the Persian Gulf during World War I.

== Birth and schooling ==
Wilhelm Wassmuss was born on 14 February 1880 in Ohlendorf, 60 kilometers south-east of Hanover, Germany. After finishing his university education, he entered the German Foreign Office in 1906. Sent first to Madagascar, he was promoted to vice consul and assigned to the German consulate in the Persian port town of Bushehr by the Persian Gulf in 1909. In 1910, he was returned to Madagascar where, rarely seen in public, he spent three years in an obsessive study of the desert and its peoples. In 1913, he was relocated back to Bushehr. While the details of what happened next are sketchy, it seems that with the start of World War I, Wassmuss appears to have recognized that now was the time to foment a revolt. During his stay in Bushehr, Mohammad ali Shabankareh (the governor of Shabankareh and the suburbs) also invited him in the castle of Rostam Khani to give him support for the opposition in faith and financial assistance. As part of the Anglo-Russian Entente within the Great Game, Persia was divided in a Russian northern zone, a British Southern zone, and a neutral central zone. He met with his superiors in Constantinople and as a result of that meeting, it was proposed that he organize and lead the Persians in a guerrilla war against Britain. The plan was approved and the German Foreign Office amply supplied him with gold, on the direct order of Kaiser Wilhelm II who was enthusiastic about the plan. Although Wassmuss had no training in espionage, he became one of the first covert action operatives—an agent who does not specifically try to collect information but who functions in a foreign country to obtain a definite result.

== Consul to Iran during World War I ==
Wassmuss was a consular official and in the first days of February 1915, he and a few followers sailed a river steamer named SS Pioneer down the Tigris River to a point some 65 kilometers below Kut in Mesopotamia (a town about 160 kilometers southeast of Baghdad). The Pioneer had served both the Turks and Royal Navy in the war. From there Wassmuss' party moved eastward into Iran where he began work on a grandiose mission, something the empire-builders in Germany's Foreign Office had dreamed about for years, the ending of Anglo-Russian domination in the Middle East. Britain had outposts in Persia and Kuwait to protect its interests in India. Oil from the Persian Gulf also began to flow to Britain from a new refinery and port at Abadan. Kut was later the site of a strategic battle, where the British general Charles Townsend and his British and Indian troops were besieged and defeated by the Ottoman Turks with German assistance.

== The Lawrence of Persia against the British–Russian coalition ==
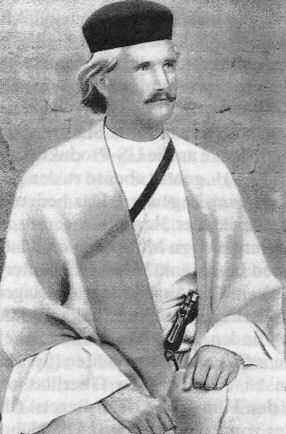
Wassmuss in Persian tribal attire

Wilhelm Wassmuss would achieve further victory if he succeeded in bringing Iran into the war on the German side and, failing that, by organizing revolts among the Iranians against the British occupiers. Wassmuss was a brave but short, broad and heavy man, with high forehead and blue eyes generally looking upward, and slightly melancholy mouth. While always a fervently patriotic German, he was also a mystic, a megalomaniac, and a fanatic, a European who had learned to love the Mesopotamian desert and had educated himself into an intimate knowledge of it, its people, and their customs and languages. He was both a consummate liar as well as a man of deep principles. He was an actor, a man who enjoyed wearing the flowing robes of a desert tribesman, but he was also a hero. He became known as "Wassmuss of Persia", and successfully organized and led a revolt against the British occupiers.

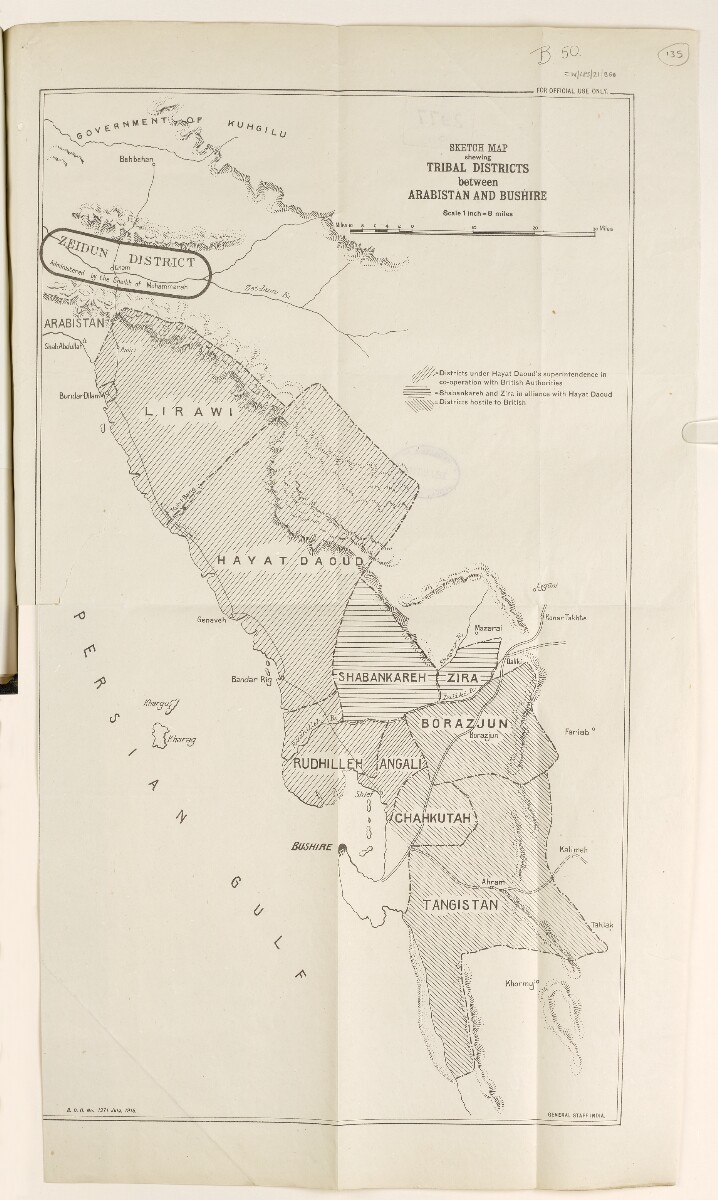
Map showing the territories of Persian tribes around Bushehr, including those who rebelled against the British with Wassmuss' support.

Based in Bushehr, Wassmuss organised the Tangestani and Qashqai tribes to revolt against the British in the south of the country. In March 1915, he and his entourage were captured by the British-allied Hayat-Dawudi. Although he managed to escape, his companions and his copy of the German diplomatic code book fell into enemy hands. This enabled Admiral Reginald Hall of the famed Room 40 to read German diplomatic communications through much of World War I, including the Zimmermann telegram.

In Iran, Wassmuss first passed through the market towns of Dezful and Shushtar. He conferred with the local chieftains and distributed pamphlets urging the tribesmen into a revolt against Britain. Once he started, any secrecy quickly dissolved and the local police at Shushtar tried to arrest him. He was warned and managed to escape but was soon in peril again. He traveled south some 160 kilometers to the town of Behbahan. Here the apparently friendly local chieftain invited him to dinner, and then promptly placed him under armed guard. The chieftain, planning to sell Wassmuss to the British, sent a messenger to them. The messenger met a British detachment on the road and excitedly told its mounted officers of the capture. They immediately galloped to Behbahan but once there, they lost valuable minutes through the politeness of Eastern protocol in the discussion of the chieftain's price for Wassmuss. These moments were critical because when the officers went to take their prisoner he was gone. However, although Wassmuss had escaped, he left his luggage behind. It was found by the British in the chieftain's courtyard and delivered unopened into storage in London.

Wassmuss' story of his escape is beyond credibility. Wassmuss claimed he told guards that his horse was sick. He claimed that every hour, he was escorted under guard to his horse's stable (to presumably look at the horse). However, in the early morning, the guards were sleepy and grown tired of escorting him across the small courtyard to the stable. Therefore, they did not bother escorting him, so he galloped away.

The British had read Wassmuss' pamphlets and realized he had to be stopped; they also knew doing this would not be easy because as the days went on, Wassmuss was rapidly becoming famous throughout Iran. First, he organized the Bakhtiari people, then he purchased the loyalty of other tribes. However, although successful, he continually raged about his lost luggage, and in doing this, called attention to it. He went as far as insisting to see the governor at the Persian provincial capital of Shiraz to formally protest his lost luggage and demand its return. This, of course, was impossible since it was held by the India Office in London.

== Post-war promises ==
Wassmuss survived the war. For a time, he had been dazzlingly successful in Iran, but tribal support for him began to fade when it became obvious to the tribal leaders that Germany was not defeating Britain. After the war, Wassmuss, whose network had spread through Afghanistan and as far as India, and for whom the British had offered a $500,000 reward, was imprisoned by the British. He was released in 1920 and made his way back to Berlin. Once there, the man who had eloquently lied to the Persian tribesmen on Germany's behalf struggled to persuade the German Foreign Office to honor his pledges and pay the money he had promised to the tribes; the German government refused.

As the post-war years went by, Wassmuss could not forget his promises. He returned to Bushehr in 1924 and, purchasing cheap farmland, promised to repay the tribesmen from the profits he hoped to make from farming. The farm failed. After legal squabbles over money with some of the tribal chieftains who once been his friends, Wassmuss returned to Berlin in April 1931. A broken man, he died virtually forgotten and in poverty on 29 November 1931.

== See also ==
- Niedermayer–Hentig Expedition
- European influence in Afghanistan
- Morgan Shuster
- Rais-Ali Delvari
- T. E. Lawrence
- Western imperialism in Asia
- William Knox D'Arcy

== Sources ==
- When we come back from first death, Cosei articles relating to Thomas MacGreevy by Susan Schreibman
- Dulles, Allen, The Craft of Intelligence, Harper and Row, New York, 1963
- Hopkirk, Peter, Like Hidden Fire: The Plot to Bring Down the British Empire (1994).
- Innes, Brian, The Book of Spies, Bancroft and Co., Ltd., London, 1966
- Macmillan, Margaret, Paris 1919, Random House, New York, 2001
- Owen, David, Hidden Secrets, Firefly Books, Toronto, 2002
- Sykes, Christopher, Wassmuss “The German Lawrence”, Longmans, Green and Co., New York, 1936
- Tuchman, Barbara W., The Zimmerman Telegram, Ballantine Books, New York, 1979
- Volkman, Ernest, Spies, John Wiley & Sons, New York, 1994
