= Rudhaleh Rural District =

Rural district in Bushehr province, Iran

Rudhaleh Rural District Persian: دهستان رودحله
- Rural District
- Location within Iran
- Coordinates: 29°23′N 50°42′E
- Country: Iran
- Province: Bushehr
- County: Ganaveh
- District: Rig
- Established: 1986
- Capital: Chahar Rustai

Population (2016)
  - Total: 7,573
- Time zone: UTC+3:30 (IRST)

Rudhaleh Rural District (Persian: دهستان رودحله) is in Rig District of Ganaveh County, Bushehr province, Iran. Its capital is the village of Chahar Rustai.

== Demographics ==
=== Population ===
At the time of the 2006 National Census, the rural district's population was 7,570 in 1,592 households. There were 7,844 inhabitants in 1,945 households at the following census of 2011. The 2016 census measured the population of the rural district as 7,573 in 2,163 households. The most populous of its 27 villages was Chahar Rustai, with 2,365 people.

=== Other villages in the rural district ===
- Chahar Mahal
- Jazireh-ye Jonubi
- Jazireh-ye Shomali
- Mal-e Mahmud
- Mohammadi
- Puzgah
