= Rig District =

District in Bushehr province, Iran

Rig District Persian: بخش ریگ
- District
- Location within Iran
- Coordinates: 29°23′N 50°42′E
- Country: Iran
- Province: Bushehr
- County: Ganaveh
- Capital: Bandar Rig

Population (2016)
  - Total: 13,825
- Time zone: UTC+3:30 (IRST)
  - Summer (DST): UTC+4:30 (IRDT)

Rig District (Persian: بخش ریگ) is in Ganaveh County, Bushehr province, Iran. Its capital is the city of Bandar Rig.

== Demographics ==
=== Population ===
At the time of the 2006 National Census, the district's population was 12,827 in 2,761 households. The following census in 2011 counted 13,463 people in 3,366 households. The 2016 census measured the population of the district as 13,825 inhabitants living in 3,996 households.

=== Administrative divisions ===
Rig District Population
Administrative Divisions	2006	2011	2016
Rudhaleh RD	7,570	7,844	7,573
Bandar Rig (city)	5,257	5,619	6,252
Total	12,827	13,463	13,825
RD = Rural District
