= Ganaveh County =

County in Bushehr province, Iran

Ganaveh County Persian: شهرستان گناوه
- County
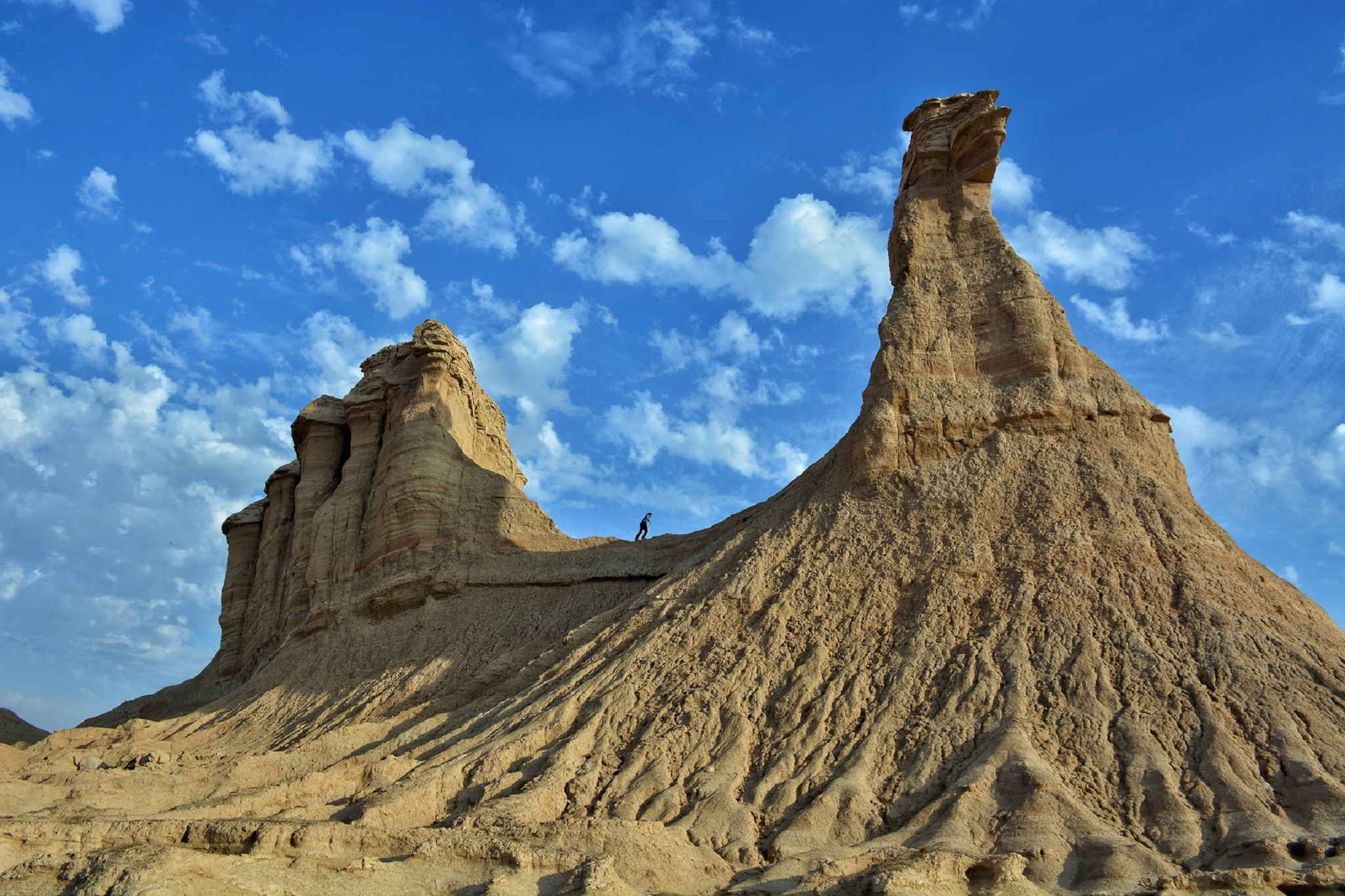
- Landscape in Ganaveh County

- Location of Ganaveh County in Bushehr province (top, pink)

- Location of Bushehr province in Iran
- Coordinates: 29°29′N 50°38′E
- Country: Iran
- Province: Bushehr
- Capital: Bandar Ganaveh
- Districts: Central, Rig

Population (2016)
  - Total: 102,484
- Time zone: UTC+3:30 (IRST)

Ganaveh County (Luri and Persian: شهرستان گناوه) is in Bushehr province, Iran. Its capital is the city of Bandar Ganaveh.

== Demographics ==
=== Population ===
At the time of the 2006 National Census, the county's population was 82,937 in 17,701 households. The following census in 2011 counted 90,493 people in 22,355 households. The 2016 census measured the population of the county as 102,484 in 28,181 households.

=== Administrative divisions ===
Ganaveh County's population history and administrative structure over three consecutive censuses are shown in the following table.

Ganaveh County Population
Administrative Divisions	2006	2011	2016
Central District	70,110	77,030	88,649
Hayat Davud RD	10,819	12,920	15,177
Bandar Ganaveh (city)	59,291	64,110	73,472
Rig District	12,827	13,463	13,825
Rudhaleh RD	7,570	7,844	7,573
Bandar Rig (city)	5,257	5,619	6,252
Total	82,937	90,493	102,484
RD = Rural District

== Notable people ==
Abū-Saʿīd Jannābī, founder of the Qarmatian state, was from Ganaveh.

== See also ==
Media related to Ganaveh County at Wikimedia Commons
