= David Khan (diplomat) =

Iranian doctor and officer (1795–1851)

David Khan Davidkhanian
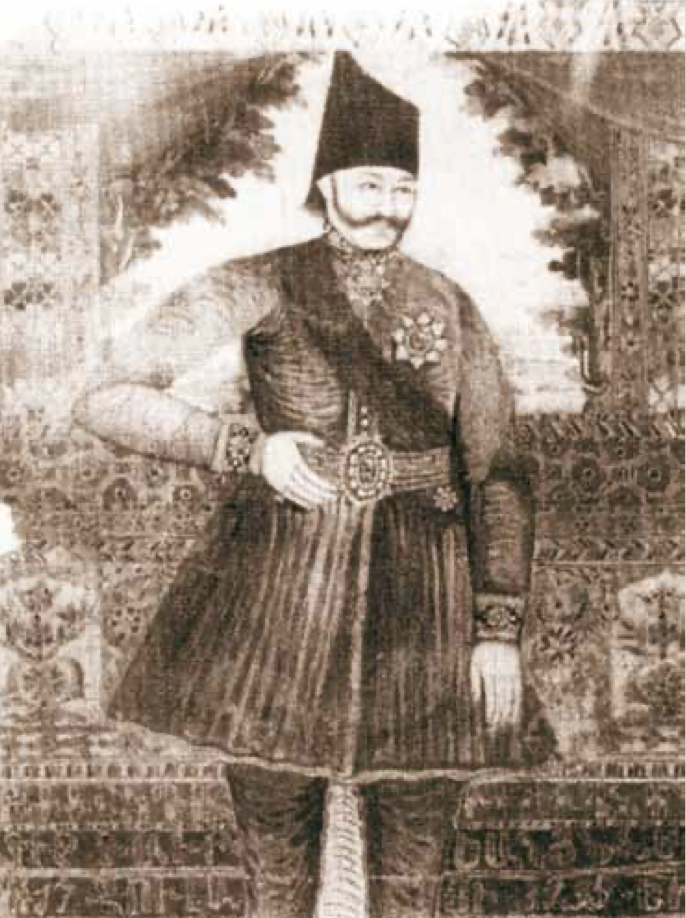

Chief Physician of Isfahan
- Monarch: Fath-Ali Shah Qajar

Personal details
- Born: 1795
- Died: 1851 (aged 55–56)
- Relations: See Davidkhanian family

Military service
- Allegiance: Qajar dynasty

David Khan (1795–1851) was an Iranian medical doctor and military officer who served as chief physician of Isfahan and royal physician to Fath-Ali Shah Qajar, the second King of Qajar Iran.

== Early life and education ==
Davidkhanian was born on the 17th of July, 1795, to Mkrtitch, a member of a family of warriors descended from revolutionary and nobleman Melik Davit Beg. Davidkhanian's birth is marked in a watercolor painting on display in the New Julfan Armenian Museum at the Vank Cathedral, showing him in military uniform with decorations. Davidkhanian was educated in Shiraz and India, where he became a physician and published his first booklet, entitled, "Smallpox." Upon receiving his medical diploma, he found friends amongst the British Indian Army, and traveled with them to multiple countries.

== Career ==
=== Early career ===
In 1816, Davidkhanian was enlisted as a military physician in service to the British. A cholera epidemic subsequently swept the Bengal village of Cheshire. Davidkhanian distinguished himself caring for the military and the public. To deepen his knowledge of medicine, Davidkhanian traveled to England to continue his education at Cambridge. From 1821-1822 he traveled to Tbilisi by way of St. Petersburg. In Tbilisi he stayed with Nerses V, the leader of the Diocese in Georgia, where he developed a reputation as a capable physician in a short time.

A cholera variant known as "Cholera Morbus," began to spread in Azerbaijan. In 1823, Davidkhanian authored a booklet entitled "Cholera Morbus," published by the newly-established printing house of Nerses V. The book was translated to Persian and sent to his family in Tehran. In 1922, the book was translated to French and presented at the second international conference on history and medicine in Paris. One of the Persian translations reached the hands of Fath-Ali Shah, who ordered his son, crown prince Abbas Mirza, to bring Davidkhanian to the Persian court. In 1825, a representative of the prince brought Davidkhanian to the court of Fath-Ali Shah.

=== Court physician ===
Davidkhanian soon developed a reputation in the Shah's palace as a competent physician, and was bestowed the title of "Khan." In 1826 and again in 1833, he was decorated in the first and second Orders of the Lion and the Sun. He also received the military ranks of Sarhang and Sartip. In 1839, in acknowledgement of his dedication and service, he was awarded by royal decree a permanent annual stipend of 400 tumans. Over the following years, Davidkhanian and his descendants received seven royal Farmans and decorations under Fath-Ali Shah, Mohammad Shah Qajar, Naser-al Din Shah Qajar, Mozaffar al-Din Shah Qajar, and Mass'oud Mirza Zelle-e Soltan.

=== Later career ===
In 1834, Fath-Ali Shah Qajar died in Isfahan. Chaos reigned in the countryside, and bandits raided Isfahan. The great square of New Julfa was attacked and about to be pillaged when Davidkhanian organized a resistance, which managed to oust the bandits. These events were chronicled in Mesrop Tagiadian's book, "Persian Histories." The translation of the text reads," An attack is made on the Great Square and unadulterated pillage of everything at hand begins, but Davit Khan Mkrtitchian, a son of our race, royal physician and bearer of the Order of the Lion and the Sun, comes to defense, recaptures much of the looted goods and inflicts injuries upon the bandits and in the process receives injuries."

In 1844, Isfahan suffered an epidemic of disease. Amongst the sick was Count Mikhail Loris-Melikov. The governor of Isfahan, Manuchehr Khan Gorji, presented a letter to the Shah requesting that Davidkhanian be sent to Isfahan. Davidkhanian traveled to Isfahan and subsequently developed a treatment procedure for typhoid in which he trained the local physicians. As attested in the journal Azgaser in 1847, many gravely ill patients were cured, including the Russian Count. For this, Davidkhanian was bestowed the titled, "Astvatskhnam," or "God-savior." Governor Manuchehr Khan Gorji, respecting his prowess in medicine, requested that the Shah appoint Davidkhanian as Chief Physician of Isfahan, a request that was honored by the Shah.

== Death and legacy ==
In 1851, an epidemic broke out among Tehran's military units. Davidkhanian was asked for assistance, and he traveled to the capital to treat patients at military bases. However, he became infected in the process and died from the disease. He was buried in the Saint Thaddeus and Bartholomew Church in Tehran. His marble gravestone reads in Armenian, Persian, and English,

Davit Khan of the Order of the Chevalier and Knight

Great royal physician

Who in the realm attended to the unfortunate

Who cured the incurable

Whose light ceased

Has left his offspring forever in mourning.

On the wall across from the tomb, there is a marble memorial on which his image is imprinted in military regalia. As Galoust Shermazanian notes, Davidkhanian could have amassed wealth as a court physician, like the court physicians of Europe, but instead he left his son little wealth. His only issue, Suleiman Khan Davidkhanian, was educated at St. Petersburg, served as an architect at court, and was known to have built several royal palaces in Tabriz and Tehran, in addition to the family seat, which became a way-station for members of the Davidkhanian family.
