= 1842 in Iran =

- Decades
- See also: Other events of 1842; Years in Iran

The following lists events that happened during 1842 in the Qajar era.

== Incumbents ==
- Monarch: Mohammad Shah Qajar

== Births ==
- December 22 – Mirza Sayyed Mohammad Tabatabai, Iraqi Shi'a theologian.
- ? – Anis al-Dawla, Persian royal consort.
- ? – Mirza Taqi al-Shirazi, Iraqi cleric.

== Deaths ==
- ? – Set Khan Astvatsatourian, Persian diplomat.
