= Eskandar Khan Davidkhanian =

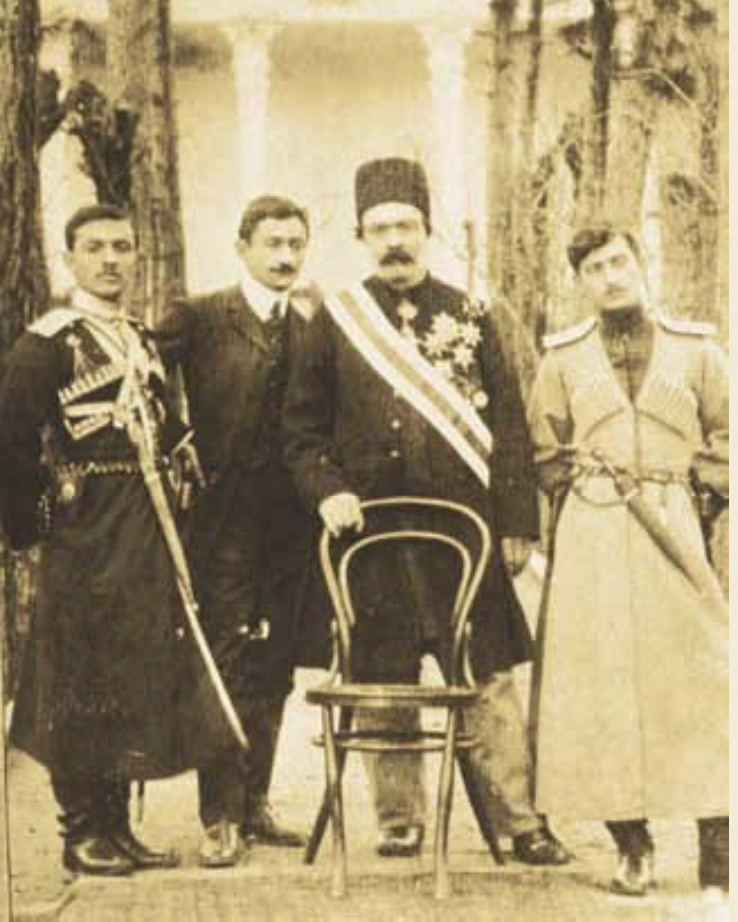

Deputy Commander of the Persian Cossack Brigade
- Monarch: Reza Shah

Personal details
- Relations: See Davidkhanian family
- Parent: Martiros Khan Davidkhanian (Father)

Military service
- Allegiance: Imperial Iranian Army

Eskandar Khan Davidkhanian was an Iranian general, professor, the Deputy Commander of the Persian Cossack Brigade, and a member of the Davidkhanian family.

== Family ==
A member of the Davidkhanian family through his father, Eskandar shares blood with Markar Khan Davidkhanian, the Minister of Finance to Fath Ali Shah. He married Karolina Hoeltzer, the daughter of photographer Ernst Hoeltzer.

== Career ==
The son of General Martiros Khan Davidkhanian, Eskandar Khan Davidkhanian followed in his father's footsteps, teaching French and Russian at Dar ul-Funun—the oldest university in Iran—as well as serving as a General in the Persian military. Davidkhanian served as the Deputy Commander of the Persian Cossack Brigade, ranking higher than the future Shah, Reza Pahlavi.

== Dispute with Fyodor Chernozubov ==
In 1906, a committee was chosen to investigate the Brigade's finances under Fyodor Chernozubov, determining that Chernozubov had been stealing the soldier's pay, an act confirmed by Russian officers. Chernozubov had mishandled the pension distribution of Martiros Khan Davidkhanian and given a portion of the pension to Alexander Khan Setkhanian, Eskandar's brother-in-law. Chernozubov was dismissed after the results of the investigation were announced, leading to the appointment of a new Commander.
