= Davidkhanian Mansion =

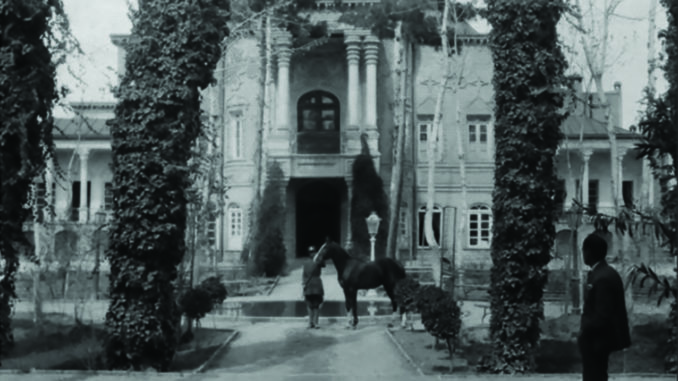
- Davidkhanian family mansion

General information
- Location: Sepah Street, Tehran, Iran
- Owner: Martiros Khan Davidkhanian; Alexander Khan Setkhanian; Government of the Islamic Republic of Iran

The Davidkhanian Mansion (Persian: عمارت داویدخانیان) is a historic estate in Tehran, Iran. It was one of the estates of the Davidkhanian family. It is now owned by the Iranian government.

== Description ==
Located on the oldest street in Iran, Sepah Street, the main building on the grounds of the estate had fifty rooms. There were also many separate buildings on the property for family members, as well as a lily pond, four tennis courts, stables for the horses, and a rose garden.

== Owners ==
General Martiros Khan Davidkhanian, a prominent member of the Davidkhanian family, owned the house for much of the 19th century while serving as a General and Chief of Staff of the Persian Cossack Brigade as well as teaching French and Russian at Dar ul-Funun as a professor. Sarkis Khan Davidkhanian, Soleiman Khan Davidkhanian, and Eskandar Khan Davidkhanian were also known to frequent its grounds.

In 1894 when his daughter Maryam Davidkhanian married Alexander Khan Setkhanian, another high ranking and highly decorated General in the Iranian army, Martiros added this mansion-compound to her dowry.

== 'Hammam-e Amir' ==
As anti-Armenian sentiment rose in Iran, based in the religious tensions between the more powerful Muslim-Iranians and the Christian Armenians of Iran, Armenians were not allowed to use public bathhouses, as it was considered haram for non -Muslims to use the public baths used by Muslims. To rectify this grievance and support his community, Martiros Khan Davidkhanian built a large bathhouse behind one of his mansions for the exclusive use of the Armenians of Iran. The people called the bathhouse 'the Emir's bathhouse.'

In his retirement, Alexander Setkhanian, husband of Maryam Davidkhanian, maintained the bathhouse that Martiros had erected behind the estate. Following the Armenian genocide during World War I, thousands of Armenians fled to Iran, enjoying the bathhouse as a luxury and haven from anti-Armenian sentiment.

== 1921 coup d'état ==
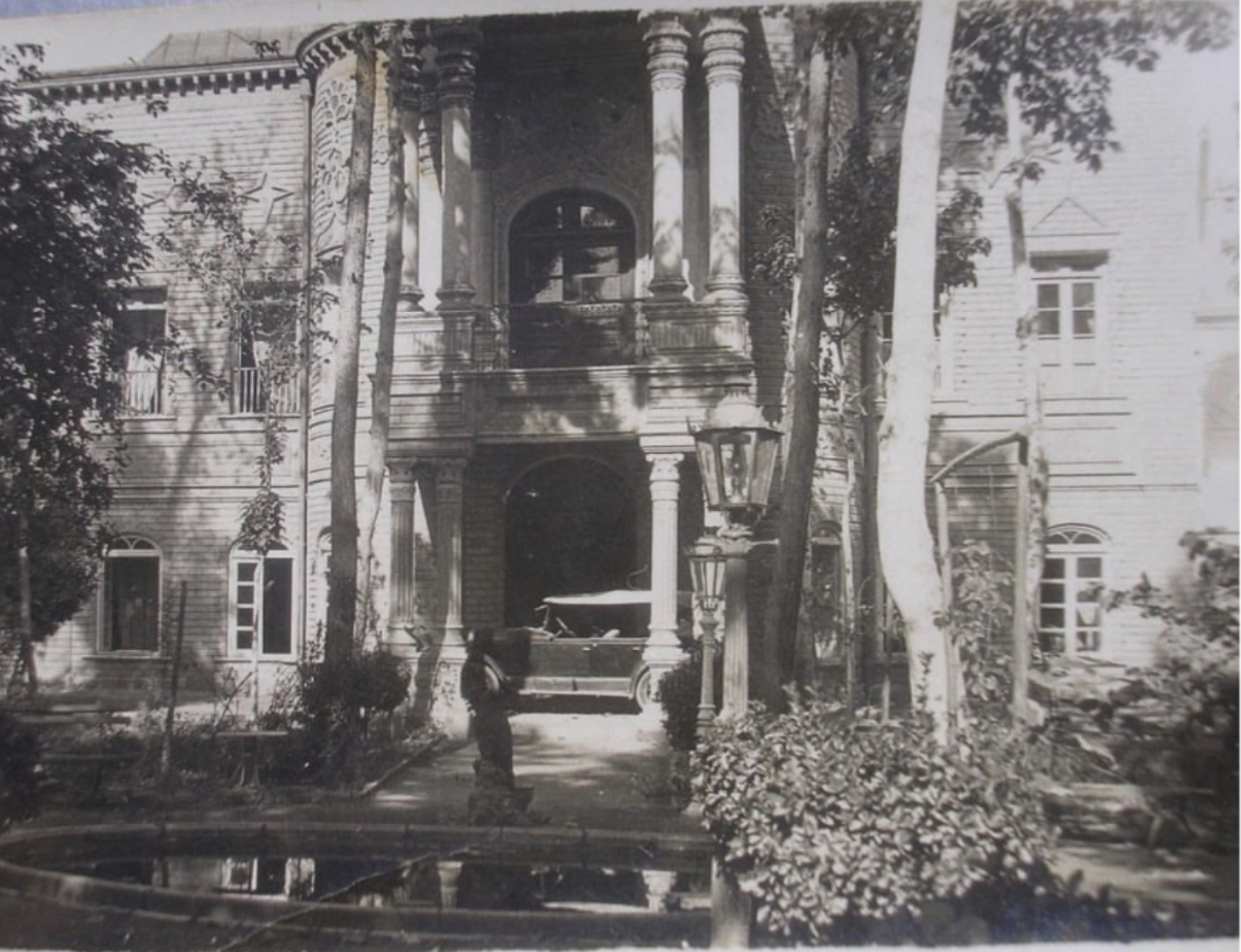
The pond at the Davidkhanian Mansion

Following a long career in the Iranian military, Alexander Setkhanian retired to the Davidkhanian mansion, relinquishing his responsibilities leading the Persian Cossack Brigade. Immediately following his retirement, Reza Khan, only a Sarhang (colonel) at the time, was promoted to Sartip, and began to rapidly rise through the ranks of the Brigade until becoming the leader of a regiment in Tehran. In 1921, Edmund Ironside, the Commander of occupying British forces in Iran, promoted Reza Khan to Commander. About a month later General Ironside encouraged Reza Khan to stage a coup against the Qajar government. Alexander Setkhanian, residing at the Davidkhanian Mansion, was visited by his colleagues in the Iranian military and urged to consider opposing Reza Khan as Reza Khan's troops gathered just outside of Tehran. As Alexander had been fond of Reza while Reza was a soldier under his command, and had developed a close relationship with him, he chose not to oppose the coup. As a result, Reza Khan led a detachment of over 3,000 soldiers from the Brigade that March, and seized the capital, forcing the dissolution of the Qajar dynasty.

April approached and Alexander had still not pledged his loyalty to the new Shah like the many generals who had come forward to declare their loyalty. Alexander invited him to the Davidkhanian Mansion to meet, where he was guarded by members of the Brigade. On Reza Khan's orders, he and Alexander were left alone to discuss matters of the future in private. The two walked the gardens of the estate, and began to circumnavigate the pond. Halfway around the pond, Alexander stopped walking and Reza Khan put his arm around the older general's shoulder, and continued to walk. Five years later, Reza Khan crowned himself Shah of Iran, establishing the Pahlavi dynasty.

== See also ==
- Martiros Khan Davidkhanian
- Alexander Khan Setkhanian
- Edmund Ironside
- Reza Shah
