= 1820 in Iran =

- Decades
- See also: Other events of 1820; Years in Iran

The following lists events that happened during 1820 in Qajar era.

== Incumbents ==
- Monarch: Fath-Ali Shah Qajar

== Births ==
- ? – Báb, founder of Bábism and, according to the Baháʼís, predecessor of Baháʼu'lláh.
- ? – Hasan-Ali Khan Amir Nezam Garrusi, Iranian diplomat, politician, calligrapher and writer.
- ? – Sattur Khan Setkhanian, Iranian general.
