= Saint George Church of Tehran =

Iranian national heritage site

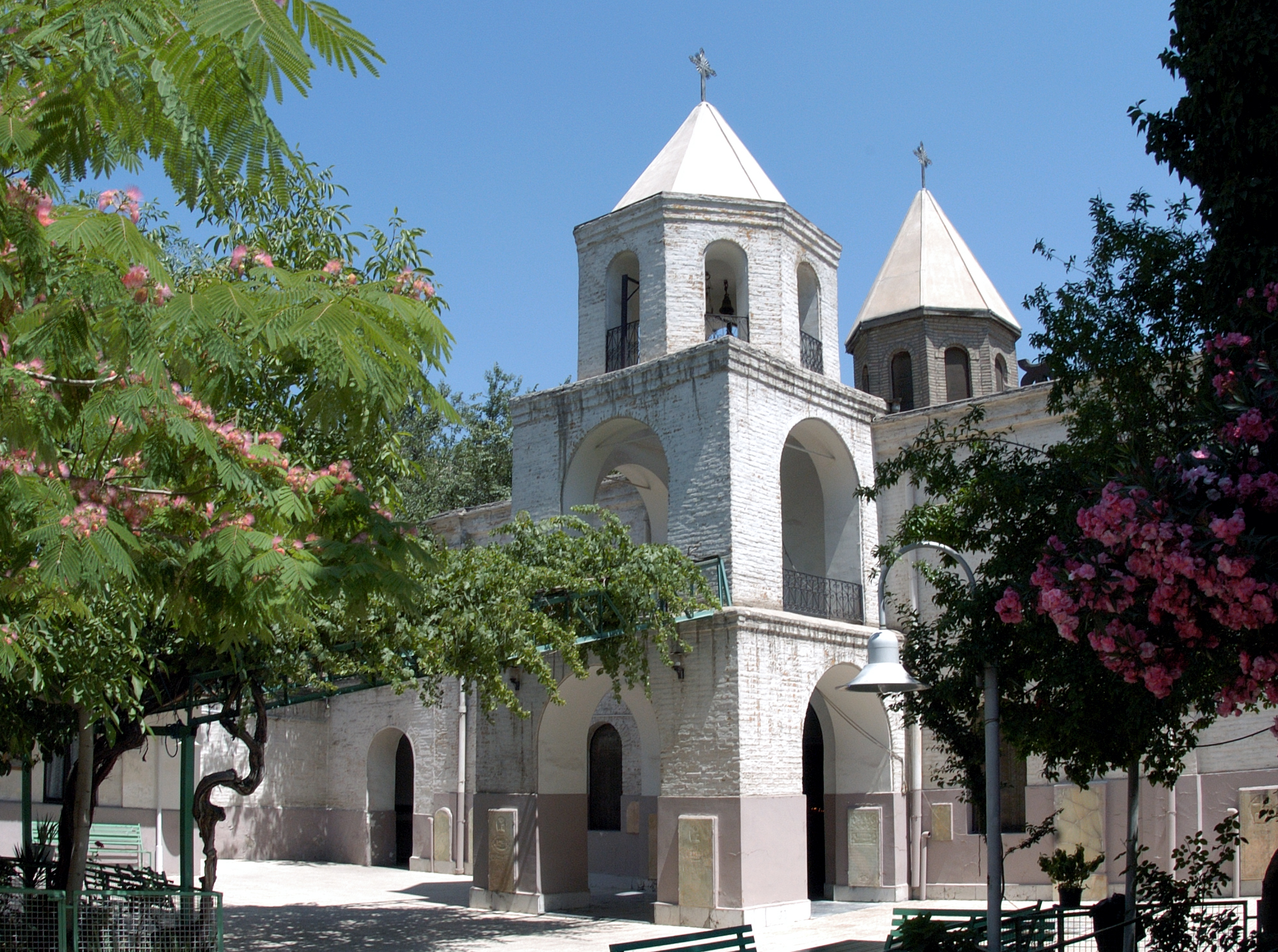
- Saint George Church of Tehran

- Location within Iran

Religion
- Affiliation: Armenian Apostolic Church
- Rite: Armenian
- Status: Functioning

Location
- Location: Darkhungah (fa), Tehran, Iran
- Coordinates: 35.67378346°N 51.41211838°E

Architecture
- Style: Armenian
- Completed: 1795, rebuilt 1882

Saint George Church of Tehran, (Armenian: Սուրբ Գևորգ եկեղեցի; Persian: کلیسای گئورگ مقدس), is an Armenian Apostolic church in Tehran, Iran. It is the second-oldest church in Tehran after the Church of Saints Thaddeus and Bartholomew.

== Location ==
It is located in Darkhungah Alley کوچه درخونگاه, Shahpour Avenue (fa), in the old Sangelaj (fa) neighbourhood of Tehran.

== History ==
During the reign of Agha Mohammad Khan Qajar, Armenians were relocated from Tbilisi and Artsakh to western parts of Tehran after his campaigns in Georgia. This church was established by two of these Armenians, Hovsepain and Stepanian, in 1795 as a small chapel. In 1871, an Armenian school was established beside the church and the current building of the church is from 1882.

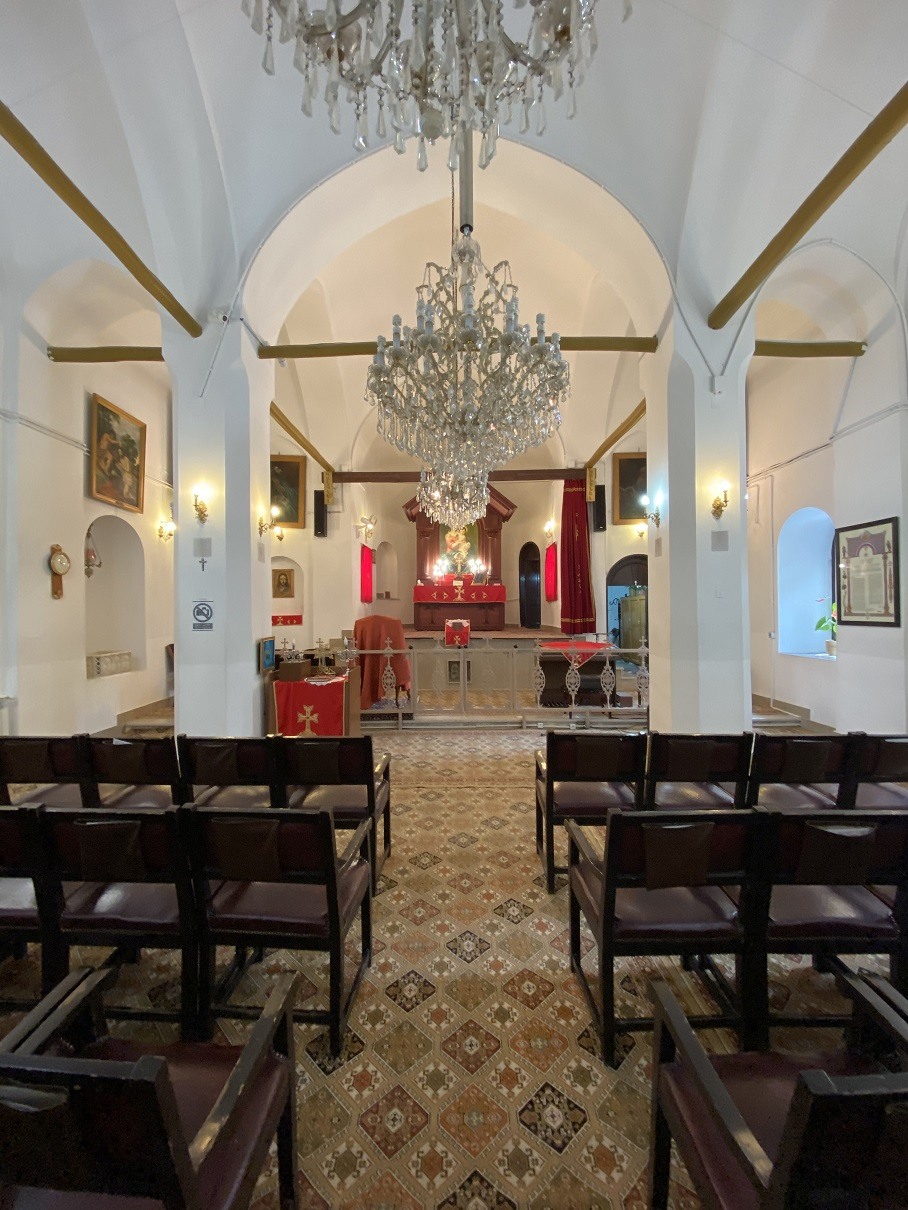
Interior of the church

== Notable burials ==
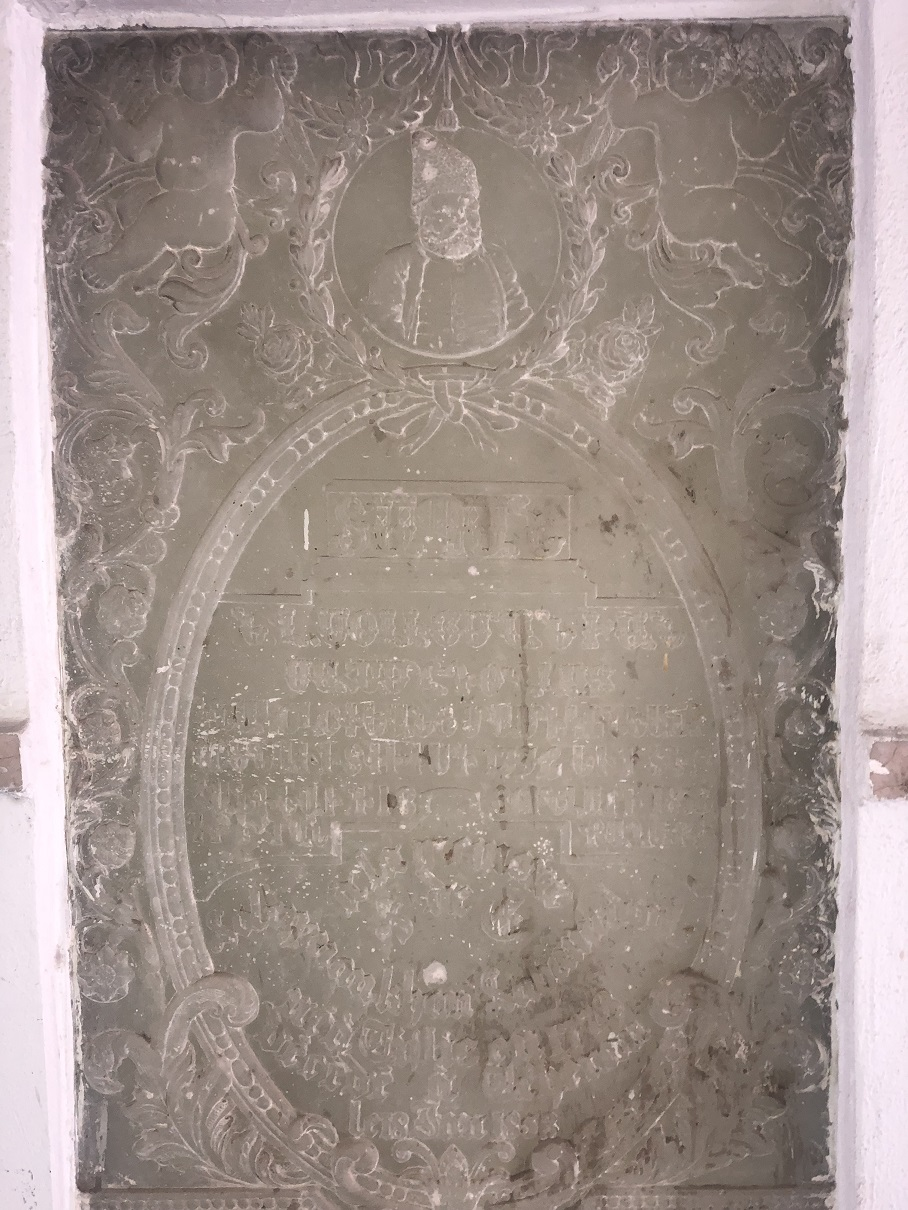
Grave of Martiros Khan Davidkhanian

- Solayman Khan Saham al-Dowleh (1782/83–1853), Iranian-Armenian statesman
- Hakob Hovnatanian (1809–1881), Armenian artist
- Martiros Khan Davidkhanian (1843–1905), Iranian-Armenian general and philanthropist

== Bibliography ==
- مارقوسیان، آرمینه؛ کریمیان، حسن (۱۳۸۶). «نخستین فضاهای زیستی و عبادی ارمنیان در تهران قدیم». فصلنامه فرهنگی پیمان. سال یازدهم - زمستان (۴۲)
- ژانت د. لازاریان (۱۳۸۲)، «روحانیون»، دانشنامه ایرانیان ارمنی، تهران: انتشارات هیرمند، ص. ۶۴، شابک ۹۶۴-۶۹۷۴-۵۰-۳
- هوویان، آندرانیک (۱۳۸۰). «کلیساهای ارمنیان در ایران». ارمنیان ایران. تهران: مرکز بین‌المللی گفتگوی فرنگ‌ها با همکاری انتشارات هرمس. ص. ۱۴۹–۱۴۸. شابک ۹۶۴-۳۶۳-۰۰۷-۲

== See also ==
- Iranian Armenians
- List of Armenian churches in Iran
