= Martiros Khan Davidkhanian =

Iranian general and philanthropist (1843–1905)

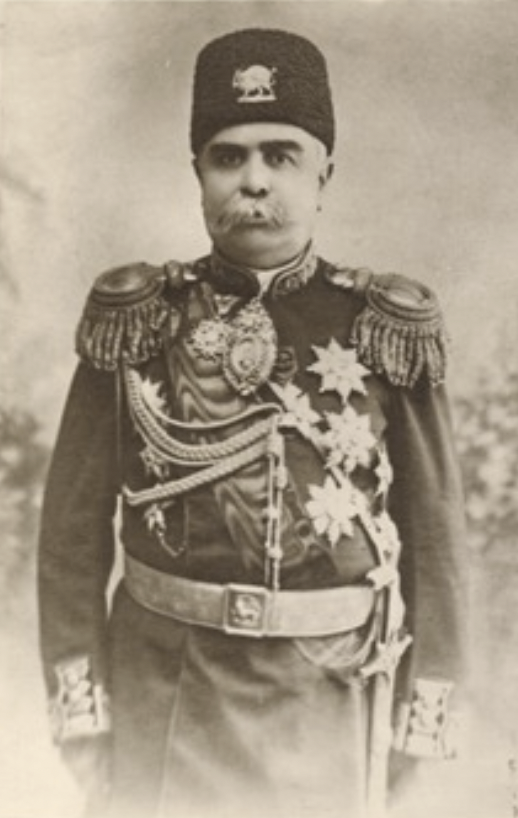
- Martiros Davidkhanian, Nor Jugha, Iran
- Born: 1843; Isfahan, Iran
- Died: 1905 (aged 61–62); Tehran, Iran
- Burial place: Saint George Church of Tehran
- Alma mater: Lazarev Institute of Oriental Languages
- Relatives: See Davidkhanian family
- Military career
- Allegiance: Imperial Iranian Army; Imperial Russian Army
- Service years: 1873 – 1905
- Rank: General
- Commands: Commander of the Royal Guard of the Qajar Court; Chief of Staff, Persian Cossack Brigade
- Awards: Order of Saint Anna

Martiros Khan Davidkhanian (Armenian: Մարտիրոս խան Դավիթխանյան; Persian: مارتیروس خان داویدخانیان; 1843–1905) was an Iranian general, philanthropist, professor, the Chief of Staff of the Persian Cossack Brigade, Amir Touman and the Commander of the Royal Guard of the Qajar Court. He taught Russian to Naser al-Din Shah Qajar.

== Early life ==
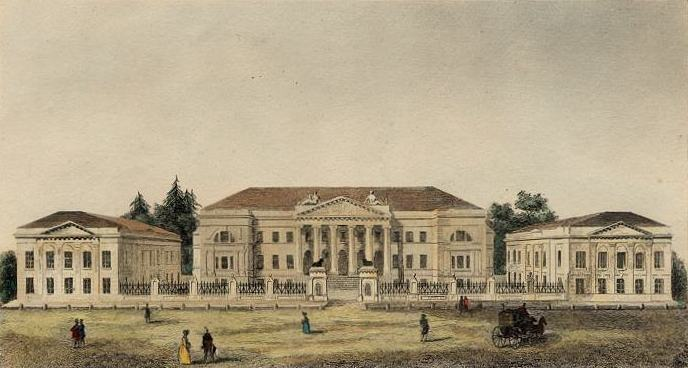
Lazarev Institute, Moscow

Martiros was born in Isfahan in 1843. He studied at the Lazarev Institute in Moscow, graduating with honors. He then returned to Iran where he began teaching Russian and French at the Dar al-Fonun school, the first modern university of higher learning in Iran. He taught there for thirty-two years.

== Career ==
In 1873 Martiros began to work as a General in the Iranian army, while serving as a translator of French and Russian in the Ministry of Publications and Special Governmental Translation Office. In 1879, when the Russian officers took over the training of the Persian Cossack Brigade, Martiros began working for the Brigade as a translator. Martiros persistently rose through the ranks until attaining the rank of Raiss-e` Arkan-e Harb, which loosely means the Head of Battle Columns. It was with this rank that he was appointed Chief of Staff of the Persian Cossack Brigade, a position he held for twenty-six years. Towards the end of the Qajar era, Martiros became Commander of the Royal Guard of the Qajar Court.

== Philanthropy ==
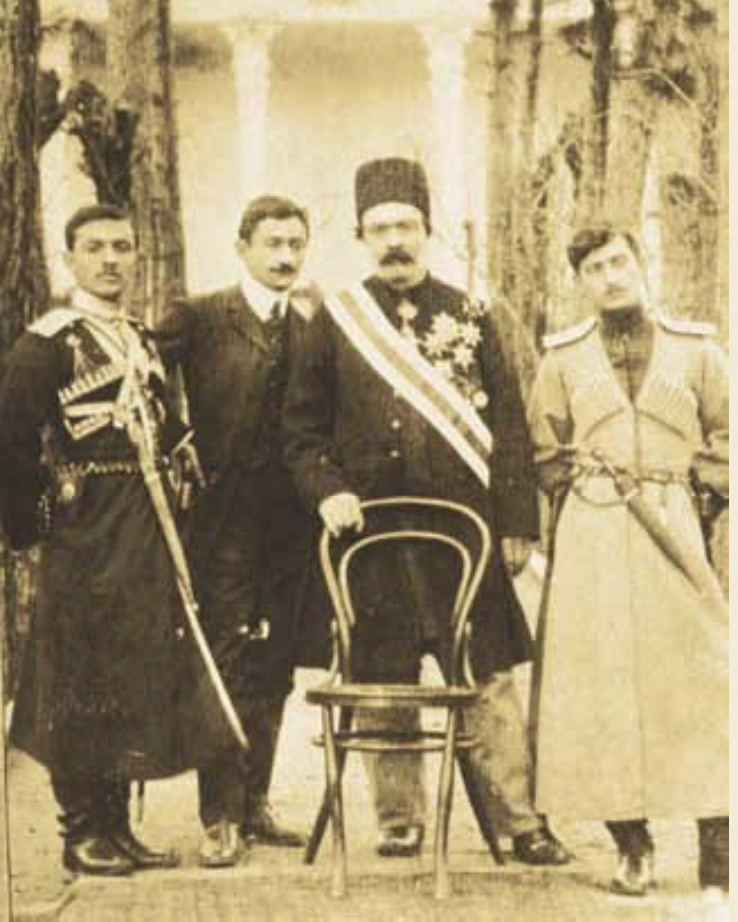
Martiros Khan Davidkhanian with his sons, including Eskandar, in front of the Davidkhanian Mansion

Martiros donated a large tract of land to the Armenian community of Iran, upon which was built a church and a private school named Koushesh. Martiros also built an orphanage in Isfahan, and was known for his sizable donations to many Armenian charities. He built a large bathhouse behind one of his mansions for the exclusive use of the Armenians of Tehran. This offer was very generous to the community because at the time, Armenians were considered unclean by the Muslims, and were forbidden to use the city's public bathhouses. The people called the bathhouse 'the Emir's bathouse.'

When his daughter Maryam Davidkhanian married Alexander Khan Setkhanian, the Commander-in-Chief of the army, Martiros added a vast mansion-compound on the oldest street in Iran to her dowry. The main building had fifty rooms. There were also many separate buildings for family members on the property, as well as a lily pond, four tennis courts, stables for the horses, and a rose garden.

== Personal life ==
Martiros has been referred to as 'Madros' by most writers, and held the aristocratic title of Sardar, and the military titles of Amir Tuman, commander of ten thousand, and Arteshbod. He was honored with the Order of St. Anne, St. Stanislaus, Saint Anna, St. George, and St. Vladimir, and was buried in the Saint George Church of Tehran. He had three sons, including General Eskandar Khan Davidkhanian.
