= Eskandar Khan Setkhanian =

Iranian general (1865–1953)

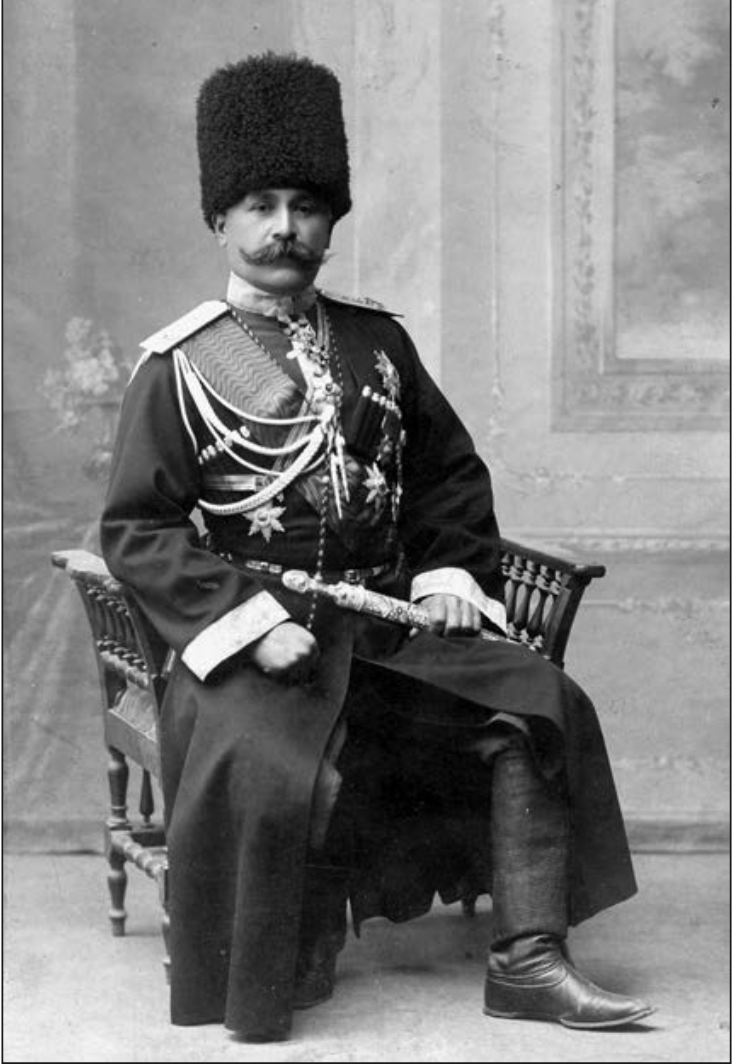
- Photograph of Eskandar Khan Setkhanian, dated 1908
- Born: 1865; Qajar Iran
- Died: 1953 (aged 87–88); Tehran, Pahlavi Iran
- Relatives: Sattur Khan Setkhanian (father); Set Khan Astvatsatourian (paternal grandfather); Hakob Hovnatanyan (maternal grandfather)
- Military career
- Allegiance: Qajar Iran; Russian Empire
- Branch: Imperial Iranian Army
- Service years: 1887–1916
- Unit: Persian Cossack Brigade (1892–1916)
- Awards: Order of the Lion and the Sun (1896) Order of Saint Stanislaus (1900)

Eskandar Khan Setkhanian (Persian: آلکساندر خان ست‌خانیان; 1865–1953) was a high-ranking Iranian military officer of the Persian Cossack Brigade during the late Qajar era.

Born into a prominent Iranian Armenian family with a long tradition of state and military service, Eskandar Khan was educated at the Russian military academies in Tbilisi and Moscow, later becoming a naturalized Russian citizen.

Eskandar Khan entered the Iranian military in 1887, quickly rising through the ranks to become an Amir Tuman (brigadier general), the highest rank achievable by an Iranian officer within the Russian-led brigade. During his decades-long career under four Qajar shahs, he played an important role in internal events. In 1897, he commanded operations establishing strategic quarantine stations in eastern Iran, which advanced Russian intelligence goals and disrupted British trade routes. During the Iranian Constitutional Revolution of 1905–1911, he commanded the division that in 1908 surrounded and bombarded the Majles (parliament) under orders from Mohammad Ali Shah Qajar, and later assisted in the ousting of American economic adviser William Morgan Shuster in 1911.

Eskandar Khan was appointed chief of staff of the Tehran headquarters in 1915 before retiring the following year. Following the 1921 coup d'état by Reza Khan (later Reza Shah), Eskandar Khan notably declined requests from colleagues to lead an opposition against his former subordinate, choosing instead to maintain their close personal relationship and allow the establishment of the Pahlavi dynasty in 1925. He died in Tehran in 1953.

== Biography ==
=== Background and upbringing ===
Coming from an Iranian Armenian background, Eskandar Khan Setkhanian was the son of the military officer Sattur Khan Setkhanian and Ninon Hovnatanyan. His paternal grandfather was the ambassador Set Khan Astvatsatourian and his maternal grandfather was the court painter Hakob Hovnatanyan. His father chose the Russian general consul in Tabriz, Stupyn, as Eskandar Khan's godfather.

While on a diplomatic mission to Russia, Sattur Khan had promised Grand Duke Michael Nikolaevich that he would send his son to be educated in the Russian Empire. Eskandar Khan's father kept that promise in 1878 and sent Eskandar Khan to study at the military academy in Tbilisi in Russian-ruled Georgia. Before departing, Eskandar Khan become well versed in Persian and Armenian at the Armenian school in Tabriz. In Georgia, he became well versed Russian and French as well, and learned military sciences and Cossack Cavalry tactics. After completing his studies, Eskandar Khan traveled to Moscow to finish his higher education. There he became a naturalized citizen of the Russian Empire.

=== Early military career ===
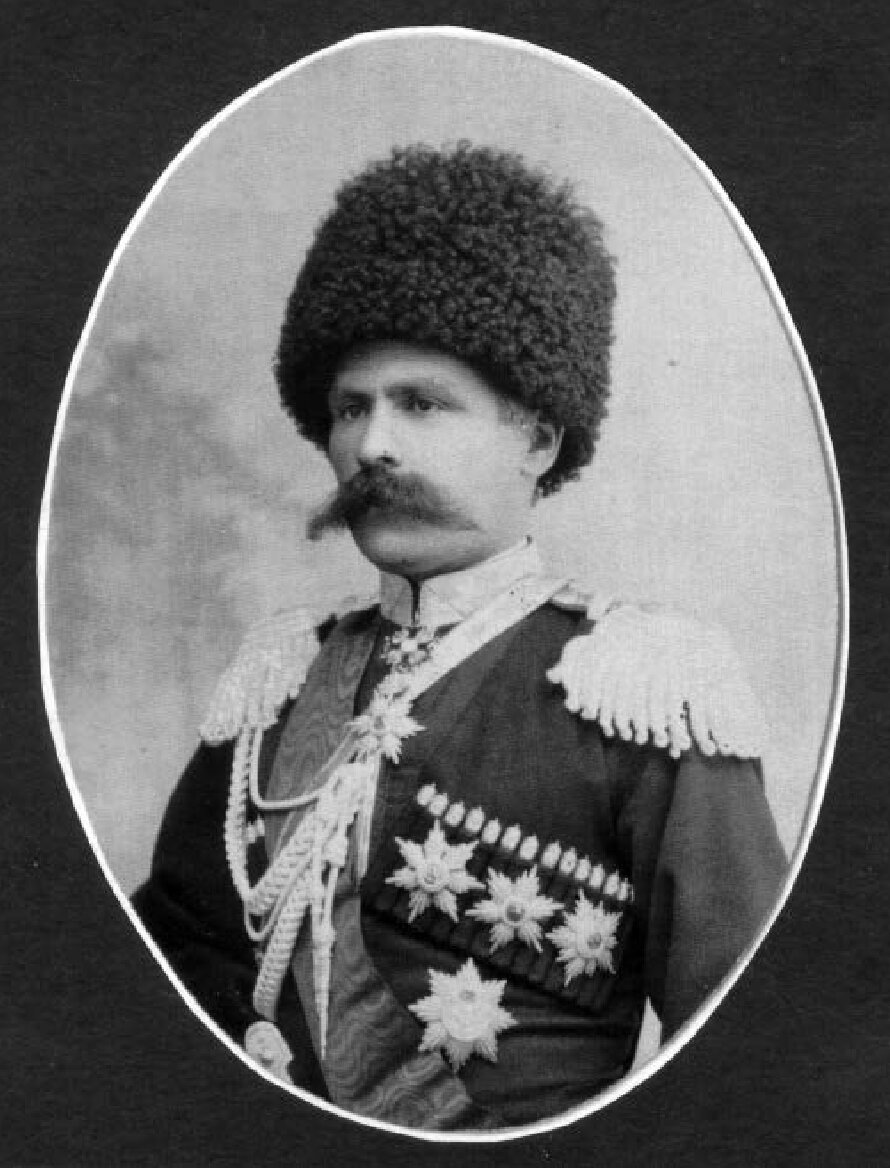
Eskandar Khan Setkhanian in 1895

After completing his military education in Moscow, Eskandar Khan returned to Tabriz in 1887 where he immediately entered the Iranian military with the rank of sarhang (colonel). After four years of serving at this rank, Mozaffar al-Din Shah Qajar promoted him to the rank of sarhang adjutant in 1892. Eskandar Khan then went to Tehran in 1892 to join the Persian Cossack Brigade, a Cossack-style cavalry unit in the Iranian army led by Russian officers.

In 1896, Eskandar Khan received the Order of the Lion and the Sun by the newly crowned Mozaffar ad-Din Shah Qajar (r. 1896–1907). Eskandar Khan was soon promoted to third-rank sartip (brigadier general). In 1897, Eskandar Khan alongside the brigade assisted the Russian authorities in expanding their intelligence gathering operations throughout eastern and southern Iran. This ongoing assistance to Russia and the shah disrupted British trade links between India and Khorasan. Under the instructions of the Russian government, 150 Persian Cossacks established twenty-four quarantine stations on the highways between Khorasan and Sistan and on the frontier between Iran and Afghanistan. This was done under the guise of stopping the Bombay plague epidemic from infecting cities in Iran and Russia. For the next decade, British officials made unsuccessful applications to remove these quarantine stations, which were problematic for their interests.

For his activities during this deployment, Eskandar Khan received the Order of the Bukhara Star Gold by the ruler of the Emirate of Bukhara. During an era characterized by a shortage of loyal Iranian military personnel, Eskandar Khan was promoted to second-rank sartip in 1900. In September 1900, Eskandar Khan received the Order of St. Stanislaus of the Second Degree as an acknowledgment of his contributions to the brigade and consequently to Russia.

=== Iranian Constitutional Revolution ===
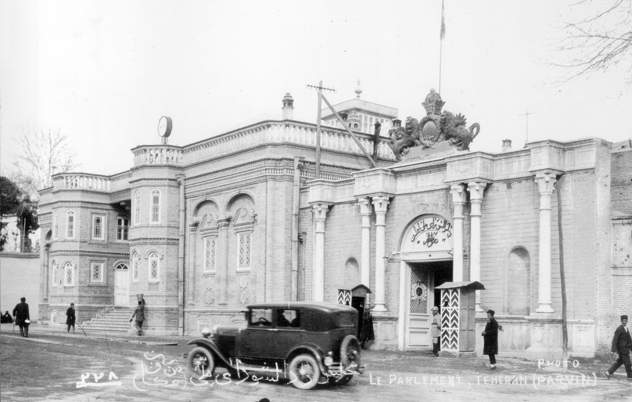
The Majles in 1813

In August 1906, a constitution and parliament (Majles) were accepted by Mozaffar ad-Din Shah under pressure from the Iranian Constitutional Revolution that broke out in late 1905. His son and successor Mohammad Ali Shah Qajar (r. 1907–1909) quickly came into a conflict the Majles despite taking an oath to maintain this framework. This was caused by the Majles' attempt at making reforms and reorganization. In October 1906, the First Majles met and its representatives increasingly identified the Cossack Brigade as a tool of Russian influence within Iran and the primary military defender of all foreign interests inside the nation.

Under orders from Mohammad Ali Shah, Eskandar Khan commanded a division surrounding the Majles. After bombarding the parliament in 1908, Tehran was placed under martial law by the brigade. For remaining loyal to Mohammad Ali Shah Qajar during the Iranian Constitutional Revolution, Eskandar Khan was promoted to Amir Tuman, the highest rank under the commander of the brigade. Upon being questioned about his involvement in the bombardment, which stands as one of the most notorious incidents in the history of Iran, Eskandar Khan answered: "I am a soldier, not a politician; my loyalty is to the brigade and to the Shah."

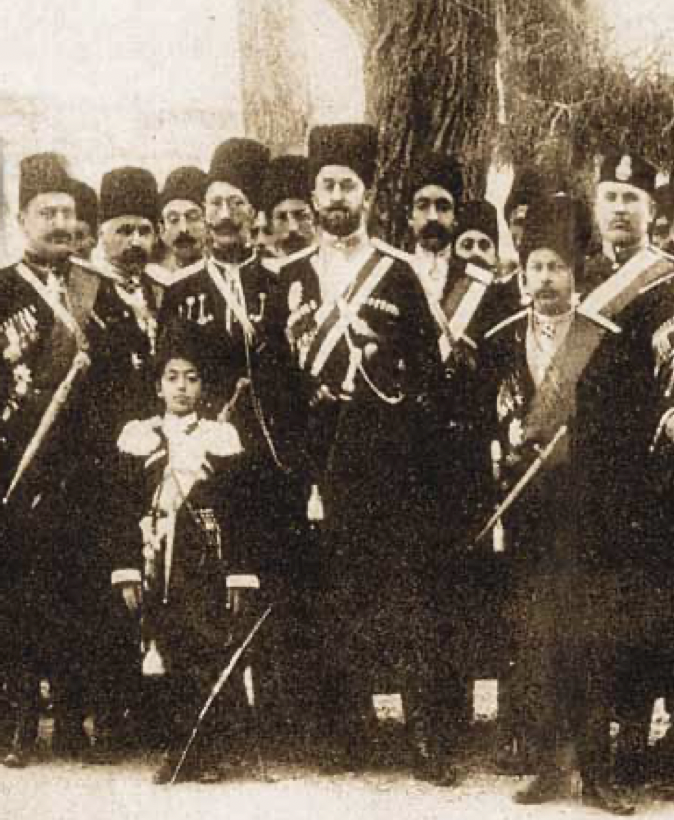
Ahmad Shah Qajar (the youngest, lower left) with General Liakhov (right of the Shah) and Eskandar Khan (right of Liakhov) as seen in American economic adviser Morgan Shuster's The Strangling of Persia

The brigade strongly opposed the subsequent appointment of William Morgan Shuster as Treasurer-General of Iran, who was working with Nationalist forces to forcefully collect taxes on behalf of the Americans, as well as seizing the estates of dissenters. The brigade intimated Shuster to such an extent that the Majles finally had him dismissed in 1911. The brigade helped to bring about the downfall of the Majles, effectively ending the era of the Constitutional Revolution.

=== Late military career ===
In 1915, Eskandar Khan was appointed as the chief of staff of the Tehran headquarters of the brigade. The following year, he retired from the brigade after more than a quarter of a century of service. Right after this, the Cossack Brigade went through the most profound shift to its leadership and external impacts since its founding three decades prior. After his retirement, Reza Khan, who served under him at the time, was promoted to third-rank sartip and made the chief of a regiment in Tehran. The British Empire was able to become the dominant foreign influence over the brigade because the conclusion of World War I and the subsequent Bolshevik Revolution had made the Russian military units depart from Iran.

=== 1921 Coup d'état ===
Colleagues of Eskandar Khan requested that he consider leading an opposition to Reza Khan once the British general Edmund Ironside had persuaded Reza Khan to carry out the 1921 coup d'état against the Majles and government of Fathollah Khan Akbar. Eskandar Khan had been fond of Reza while Reza was a soldier under his command for two years, and had developed a close relationship with him. Reza Khan was often seen around the Davidkhanian mansion during those years. Eskandar Khan chose not to oppose his takeover.

As April approached following the coup, Eskandar Khan had still not pledged his loyalty to the new Shah. Eskandar Khan invited him to the Davidkhanian mansion on Sepah Street, where he had Cossacks guarding him and his family. On Reza Khan's orders, he and Eskandar Khan were let alone to discuss the future in private. The two walked the garden of the estate, and began to circumnavigate the pond. Halfway around the pond, Eskandar Khan stopped walking, and Reza Khan put his arm around the older general's shoulder, and continued to walk. Five years later, Reza Khan crowned himself shah of Iran, establishing the Pahlavi dynasty.

== Death ==
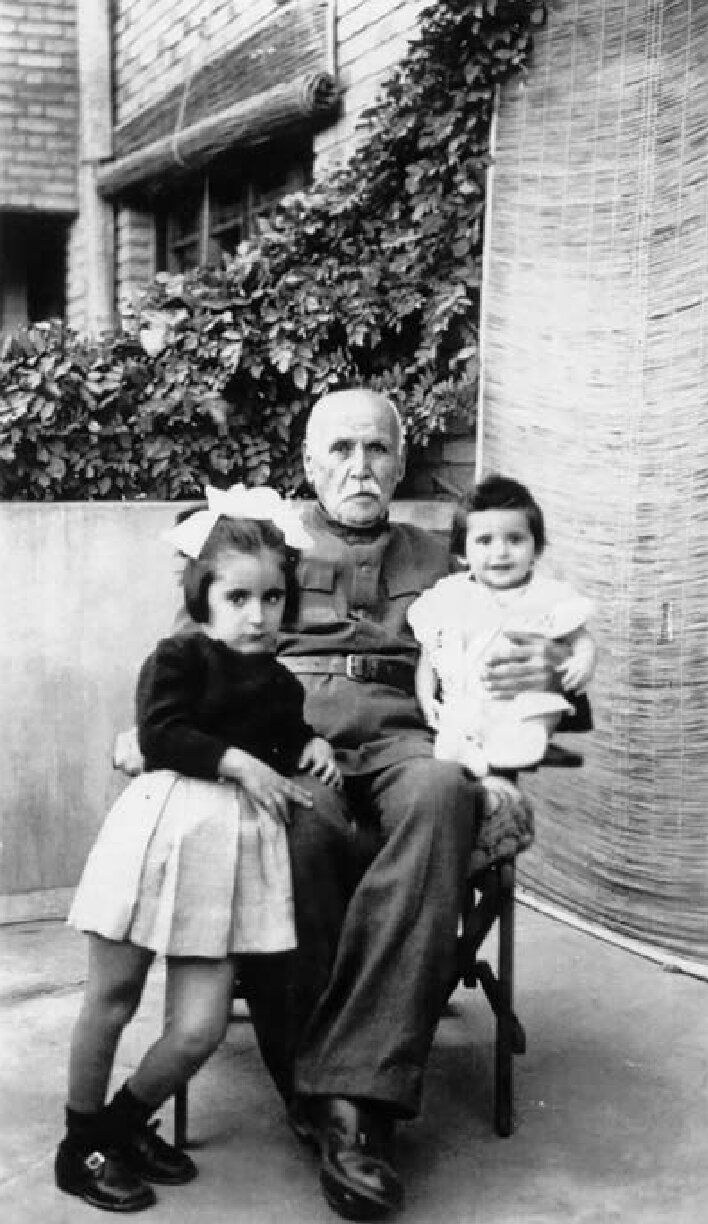
Eskandar Khan Setkhanian in a uniform, with granddaughters Mara (left) and Arlette, Tehran, 1952

Eskandar Khan died in 1953. Following his death, a vast crowd of mourners crowded Tehran's Armenian church to pay respects to him. Among the mourners were numerous government officials and military officers representing the Pahlavi regime. A military spokesman reportedly apologized to the family for the small number of officials in attendance, explaining that the current political turmoil made their attendance difficult.

Following the service, government officials and military officers gathered outside to praise the virtues of a man who had served his country under four Qajar Shahs, and whose family had served the country for more than a century. Great admiration was earned by Eskandar Khan through his lifetime of service to Iran, resulting in the public reverence shown to him and his household. The current ruling administration was established the direct involvement of figures such as Eskandar Khan.

His casket was covered in the Iranian flag and carried on the shoulders of a military honor guard. The streets leading to the cemetery were lined with hundreds of uniformed soldiers.

== Personal life ==
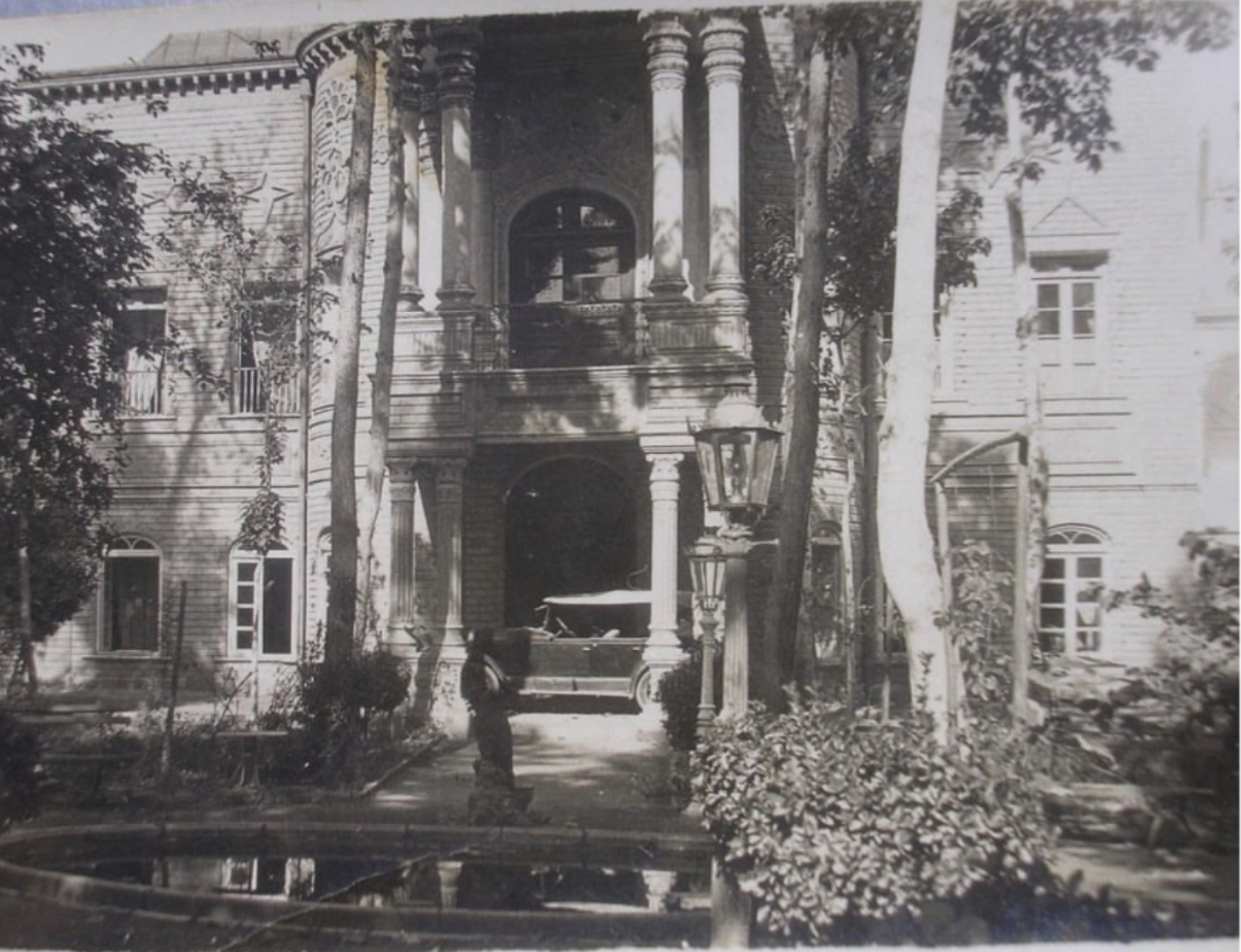
Davidkhanian mansion, Tehran, 1884

In 1894, Eskandar Khan married Maryam Davidkhanian, the daughter of another General, Martiros Khan Davidkhanian.

Eskandar Khan maintained the family tradition of sending sons abroad for education just as his father, grandfather, and great-grandfather had done. He selected the Lazarev Institute of Oriental Languages in Moscow for his sons despite there being a school for children of brigade officers in Iran. He did this expecting that they would also receive a useful education and have the same types of opportunities that he had while serving the shahs of Iran. Los Angeles and its surrounding areas serve as the current residence for most of his descendants.

In his retirement, Eskandar Khan maintained the Hammam-e Amir that Martiros Khan Davidkhanian had erected behind the Davidkhanian mansion for Iranian Armenians, as well as took part in hunting, fishing, and fine woodworking. During this period, Eskandar Khan also spent time at the Soviet embassy in Tehran since diplomatic relations had been restored in 1920, maintaining friendships with the Ambassador and other members of the Soviet diplomatic mission.

== Sources ==
- Atkin, Muriel (1993). "Cossack Brigade". In Yarshater, Ehsan (ed.). Encyclopædia Iranica (Online ed.). Encyclopædia Iranica Foundation. ISBN 978-1568590073.
- Yaghoubian, David (2014). Ethnicity, Identity, and the Development of Nationalism in Iran. Syracuse University Press. ISBN 978-0815633594.
