= Sepah Street =

Historic street in Qazvin, Iran

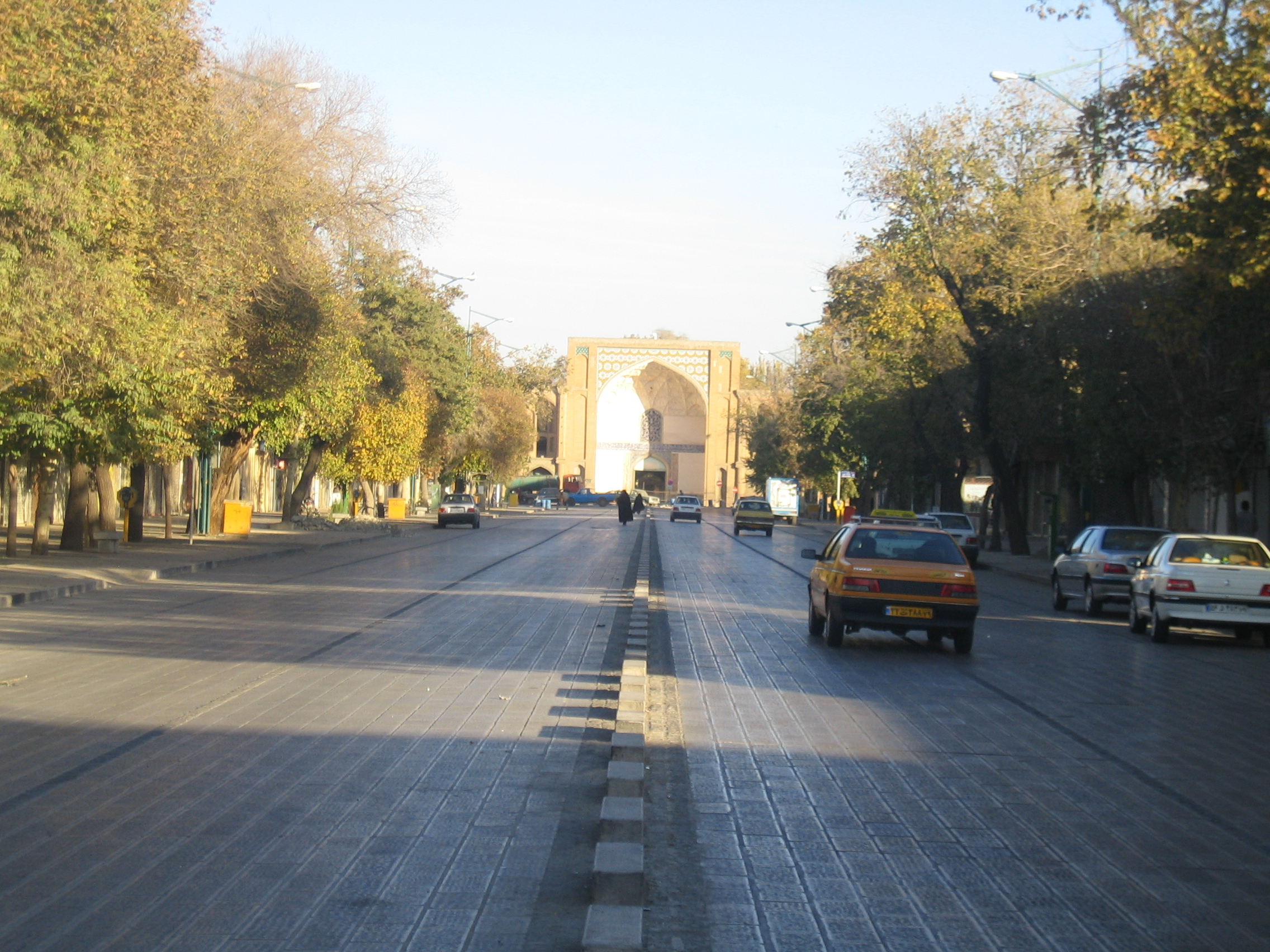
- Interactive map of Sepah Street
- Location: Qazvin, Iran

History
- Built: 16th century

The Sepah Street (Persian: خیابان سپه), also known as the Shohada Street (خیابان شهدا), is a street in Qazvin, Iran. It is the oldest planned street in Iran, built when Qazvin was the capital of Iran's Safavid Empire.

The street leads to the Safavid royal complex in Qazvin, and passes next to the Jameh Mosque of Qazvin and Imamzadeh Hossein.

== Name ==
During the Qajar era, the street was known as "Dowlati". The name Sepah was given to the street during the rule of Reza Shah Pahlavi. In the Persian language "Sepah" means "army". After the Iranian revolution in 1979, the street was renamed to Shohada street, Shohada meaning "Martyrs", to commemorate the Iranian soldiers killed during the Iran–Iraq War, and to remove the association the previous name had to the Pahlavi dynasty.

== History ==
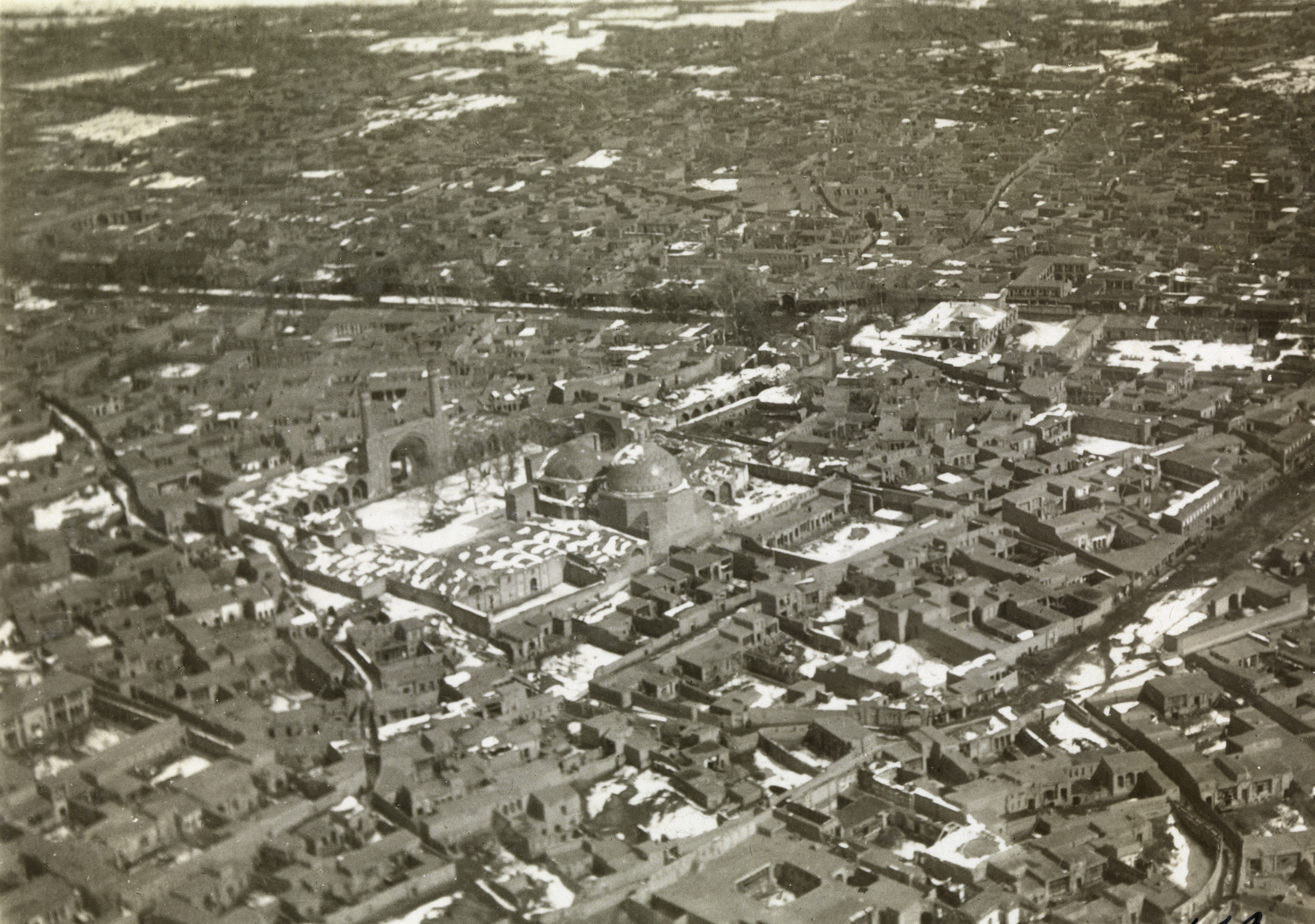
Jameh mosque of Qazvin in 1925. Sepah street is visible in the picture.

In 1546, Shah Tahmasp I moved the Safavid capital from Tabriz, which was vulnerable to Ottoman attacks, to Qazvin, a more secure location. During this time, many palaces and gardens were created, as well as the building of Imamzadeh Hossein, and the street was created to connect these places. It is the oldest planned street in Iran.

== Gallery ==
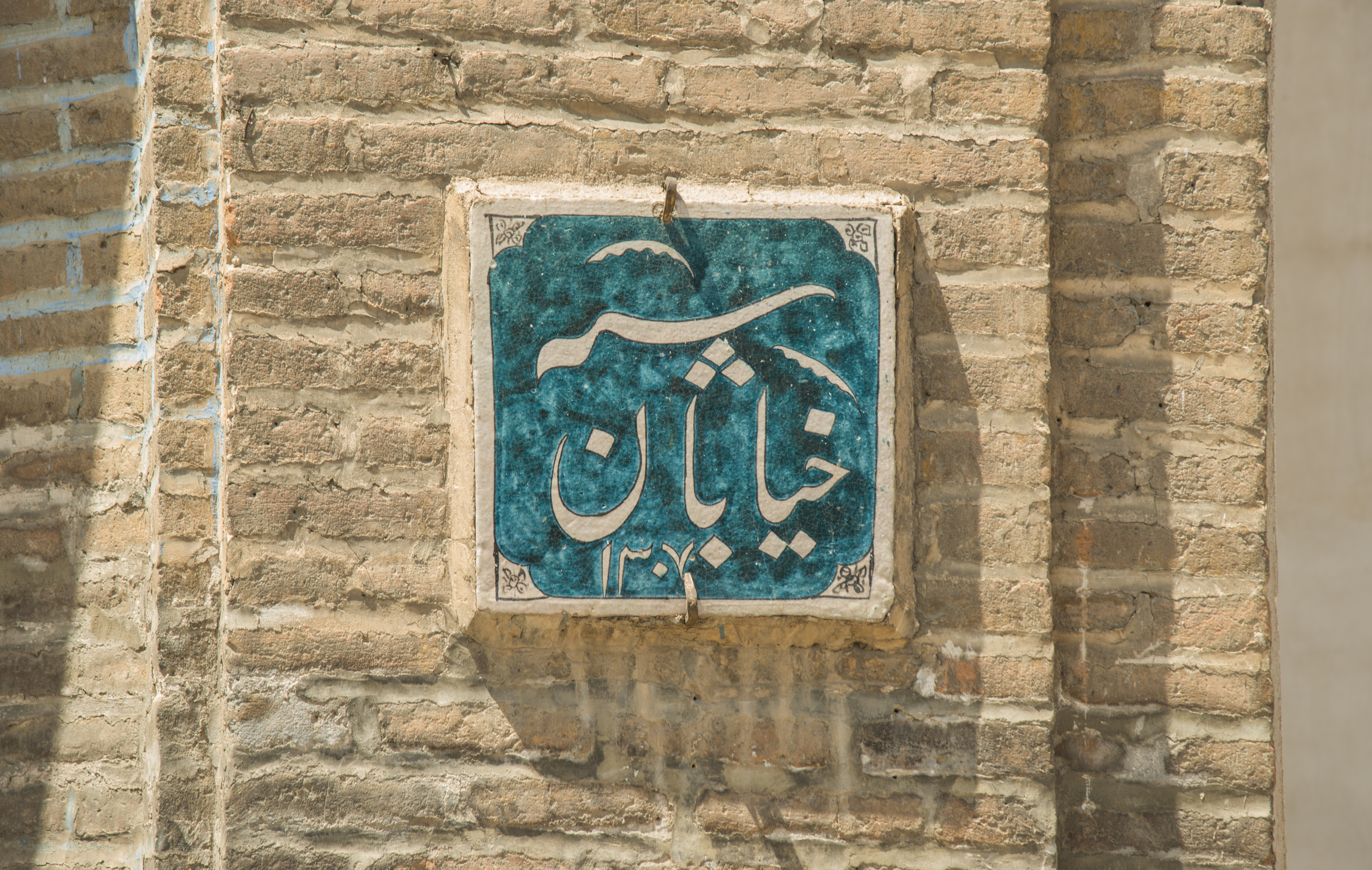
Tile on the gate to the Safavid royal complex, reading "Sepah Street"

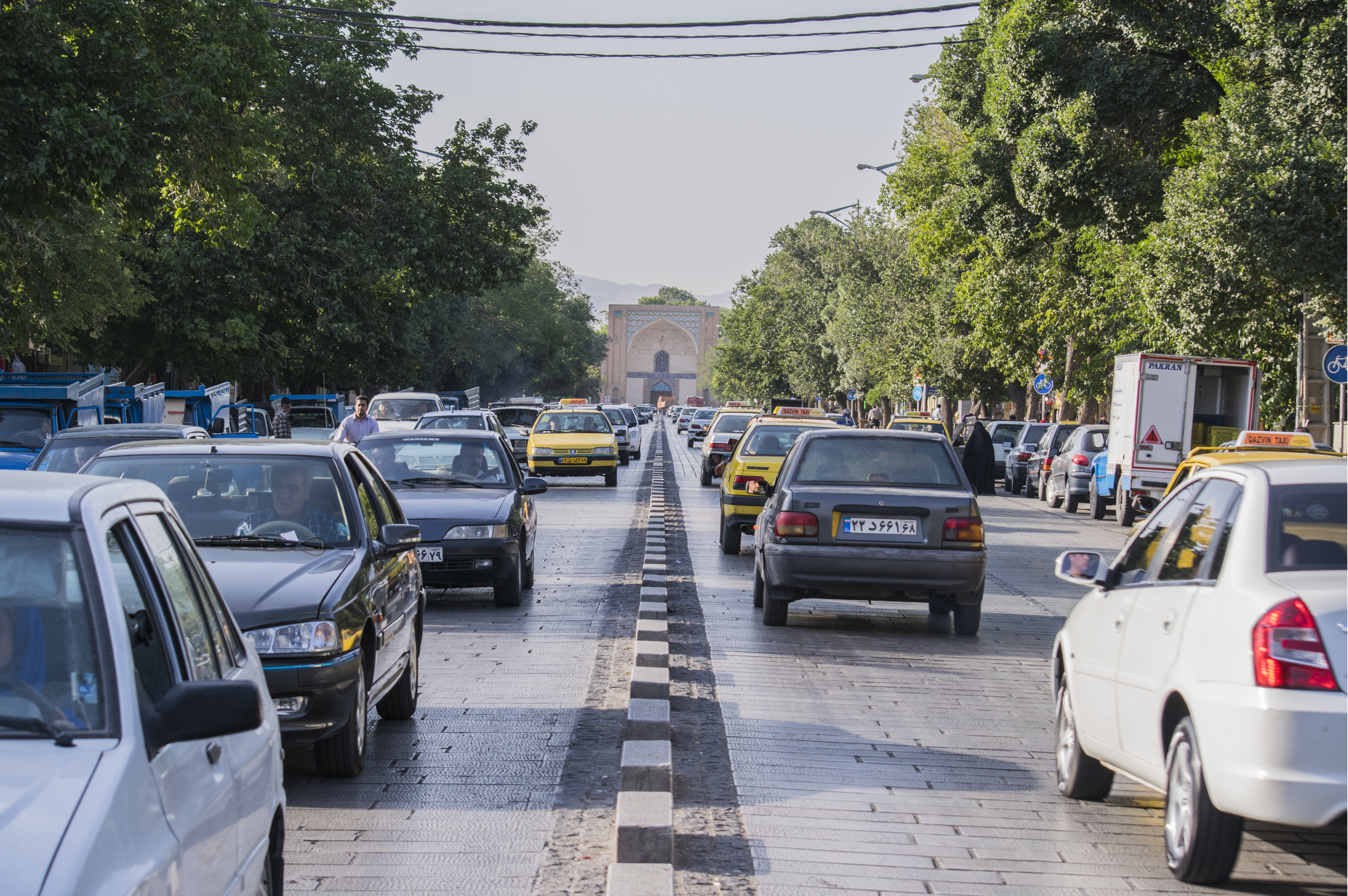
Sepah street

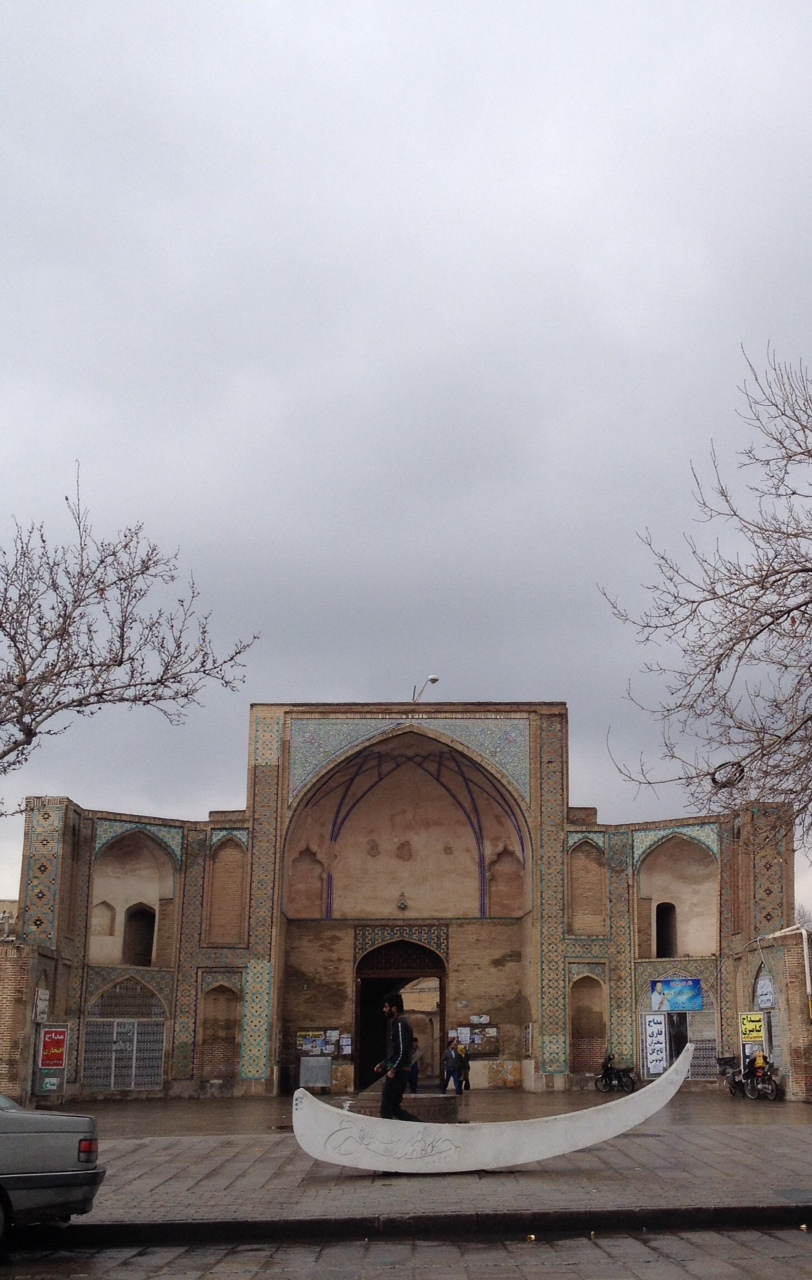
Entrance to the Jameh mosque of Qazvin as seen from the Sepah street
