= Markar Khan Davidkhanian =

Iranian-Armenian courtier (1804–1847)

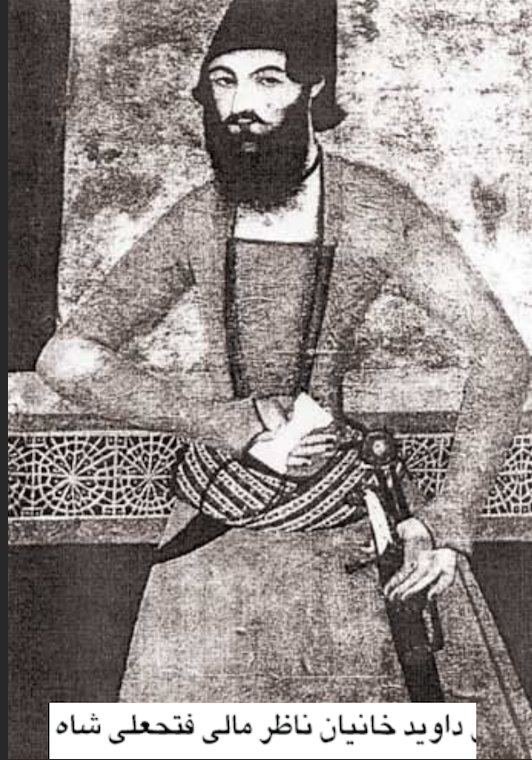

Chief of Beverage Procurement
- In office 1819–1834
- Monarch: Fath-Ali Shah Qajar

Personal details
- Born: 1804 Shiraz, Iran
- Died: 1847 (aged 42–43) Tehran, Iran
- Relations: See Davidkhanian family

Markar Khan Davidkhanian (Armenian: Մարգար խան Դավիթխանյան, Persian: مارکار خان داویدخانیان; 1804–1847) was the chief of beverage procurement for Fath-Ali Shah Qajar, the second Qajar Shah of Iran, and a member of the Davidkhanian family.

== Biography ==
Davidkhanian was born in 1804 in Shiraz, Iran. He studied in an English College in India. After returning to Iran, he started serving in the military. He later became the chief of beverage procurement, also called Nazer, for Fath-Ali Shah Qajar. In his 15 years of serving the shah, Davidkhanian was meticulous and highly reliable. He died in January 1847 in Tehran, Iran.

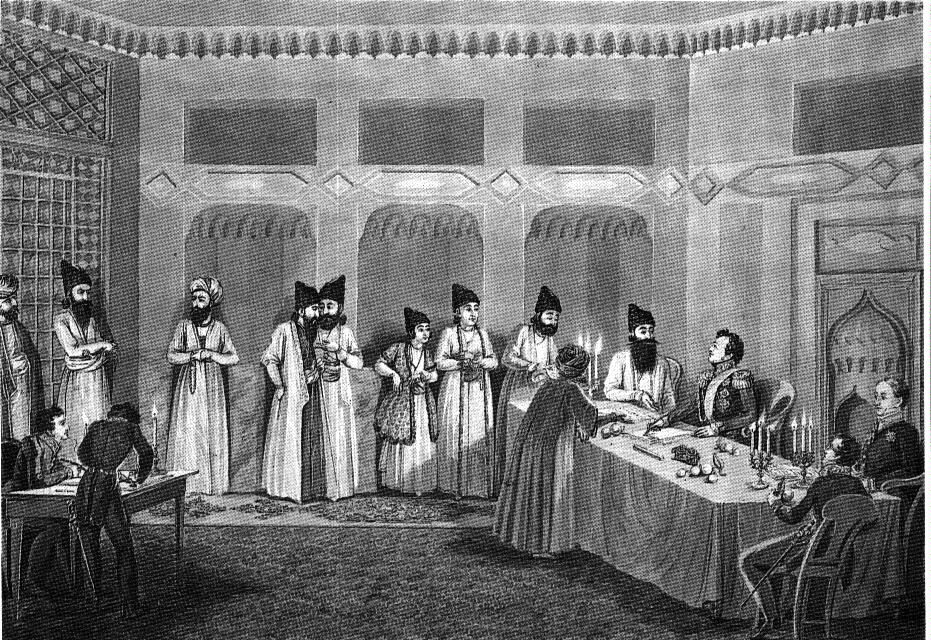
Signing of the Treaty of Turkmenchay

== Alternate names ==
Markar Khan's alternate names may include:

- Markar Khan Davithkhanian
- Margar Khan Davithkhanian
- (Persian) مارکار خان داویدخانیان
