= Sattur Khan Setkhanian =

Persian general

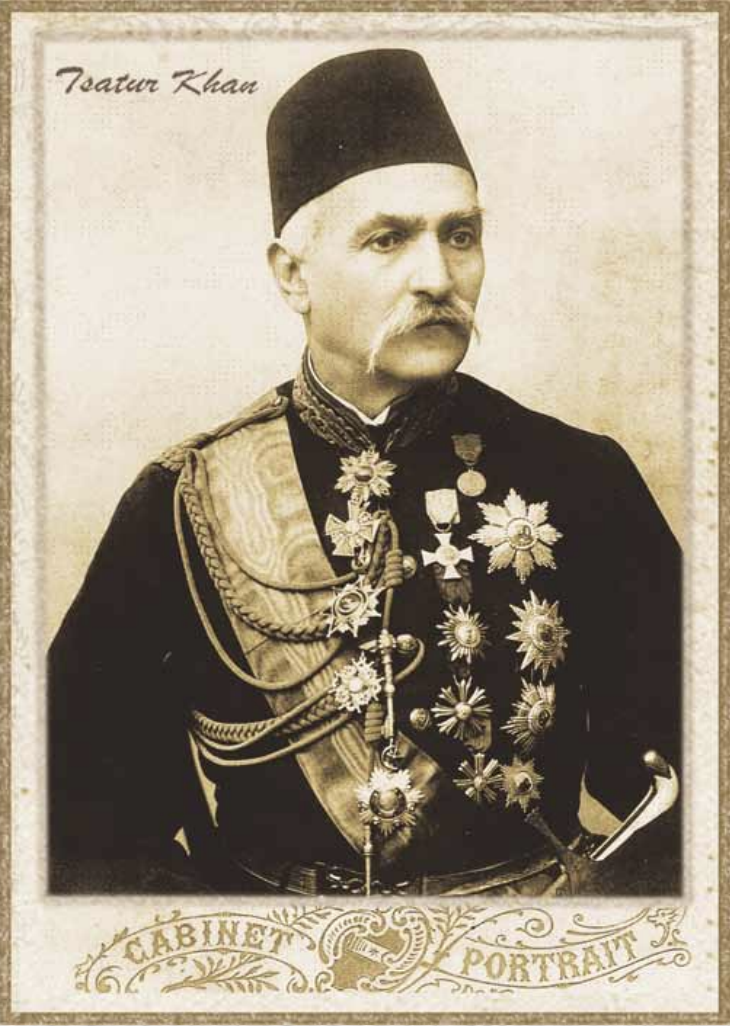
- Cabinet portrait of Sattur Khan Setkhanian, dated c. 1900

Envoy of Iran to the Russian Empire
- Monarch: Mozaffar ad-Din Shah Qajar

Personal details
- Born: 1820
- Died: 1905 (aged 84–85)
- Relations: Set Khan Astvatsatourian (father); Eskandar Khan Setkhanian (son)
- Education: University of Cambridge; Eton College

Military service
- Allegiance: Imperial Iranian Army
- Rank: Brigadier General

Sattur Khan Setkhanian (c. 1820–1905) was an Iranian general, envoy to the Russian Empire, and advisor to Shah Mozaffar ad-Din Qajar, the fifth Qajar shah (king) of Iran. He was a close friend of Grand Duke Michael Nikolaevich of Russia.

== Biography ==
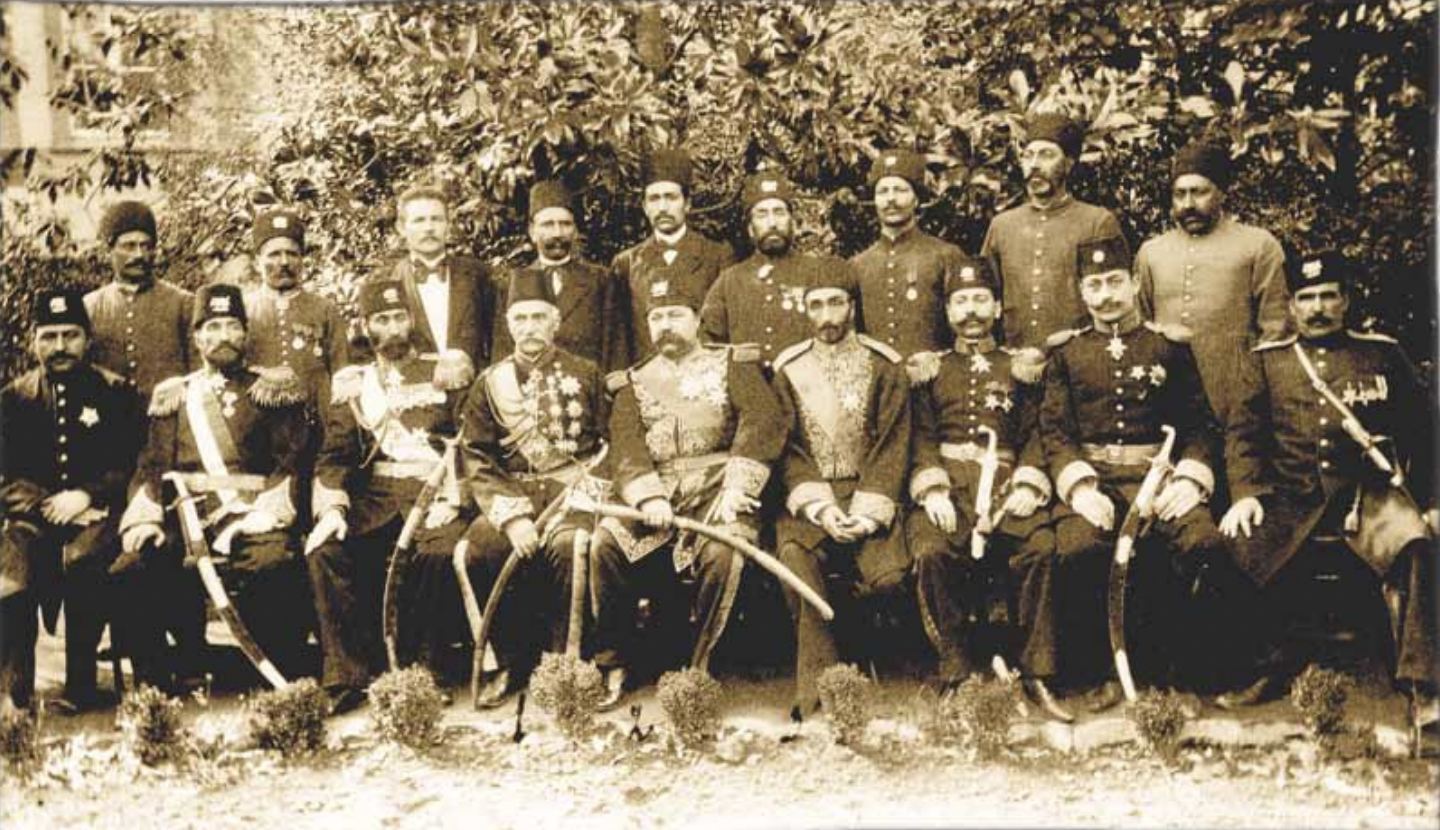
Sattur Khan with the Russian Ambassador to Iran

Sattur Khan was a son of the Iranian-Armenian diplomat and military advisor Set Khan and Zizi Khanom. He studied at the University of Cambridge. Because he was highly educated and his father had been a prominent government official and close friend of the Qajars, Sattur was appointed as an Advisor to the young Crown Prince Mozaffar-ad-Din Qajar in Tabriz.

Sattur Khan settled in Tabriz with his wife, where he served as a military staff officer in the Persian army, as well as took on diplomatic responsibilities as the Chief Deputy of Iran in charge of meeting with foreign dignitaries. In this role, he visited England with Naser al-Din Shah Qajar, continuing his family's tradition of diplomacy. Notably, Mkrtich Khrimian asked for his assistance in protecting the Armenian community from Kurdish and Turkish attacks. Sattur Khan was married to Ninon Hovnatanian, the daughter of Iranian-Armenian court painter Hakob Hovnatanyan.

=== Envoy to Russia ===
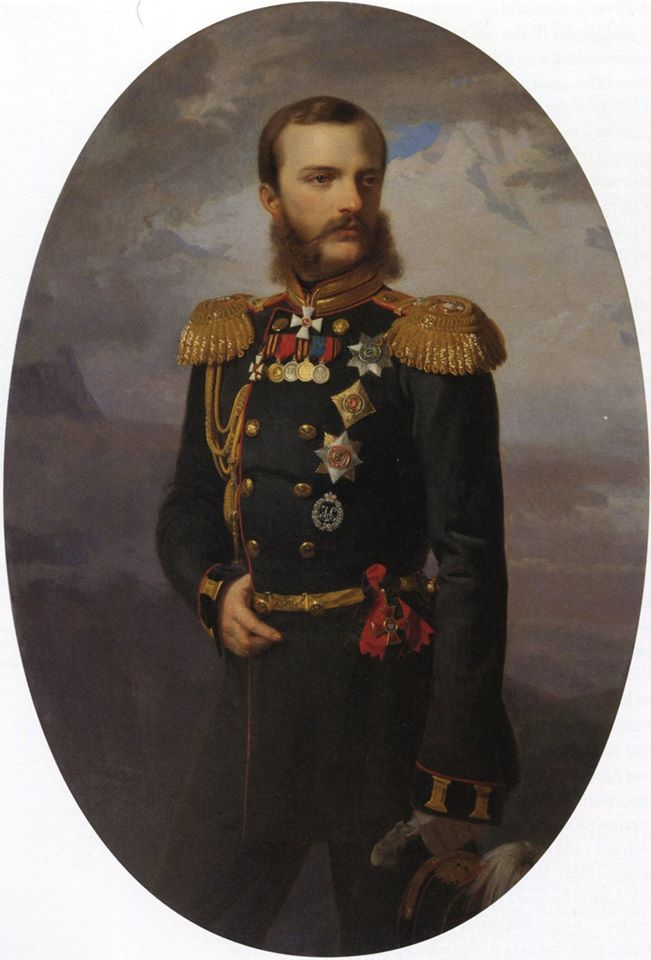
Grand Duke Mikael Nikolaevich

Mikhail Nikolayevich, Grand Duke of the Caucasus, sent a pair of well-bred hunting dogs as a gift to Shah Mozaffar-al-Din Qajar. In return, the Prince decided to return the favor by sending the Grand Duke a pair of Arabian horses through a delegation headed by Sattur Khan. The Duke was grateful for the horses, and impressed by Sattur Khan's sophistication. The Grand Duke asked how he had attained it, whereby Sattur Khan told him of his education at Cambridge. The Duke then asked him why Sattur Khan had traveled so far to receive an education, as many members of the Iranian aristocracy were known to receive their education in Russia.

Sattur Khan responded to the Duke that it was because his father, Set Khan, had served as Ambassador to England. The Grand Duke announced that he would forgive Sattur Khan on the condition that Sattur promise the Duke that he would send his children to Russia to be educated, at the Duke’s expense. Sattur Khan agreed, thus beginning his friendship with the Grand Duke and closer ties with Russia.

== Sources ==
- Yaghoubian, David (2014). Ethnicity, Identity, and the Development of Nationalism in Iran. Syracuse University Press. ISBN 978-0815633594.
