= Governor of Isfahan =

Agency overview
- Website: isfahan.gov.ir

Isfahan Governor office is subordinate to Isfahan provincial government.

It mainly performs administrative and order keeping tasks in Isfahan county.

Governor also is in charge of holding presidential and parliament elections and administration for political parties in the county.

== Departments ==
- Dept. Security and political
- Covid pandemic HQ
- Women and family health cultural - societal workgroup
- Narcotics police coordination
- Elderly council
- Council for culture of martyrdom in the county
- Provincial committee for crop
- County price control joint committee
- Agricultural loans workgroup
- Water source joint department with municipality
- Employment and investment workgroup
