= Set Khan Astvatsatourian =

Persian diplomat (c. 1780 – 1842)

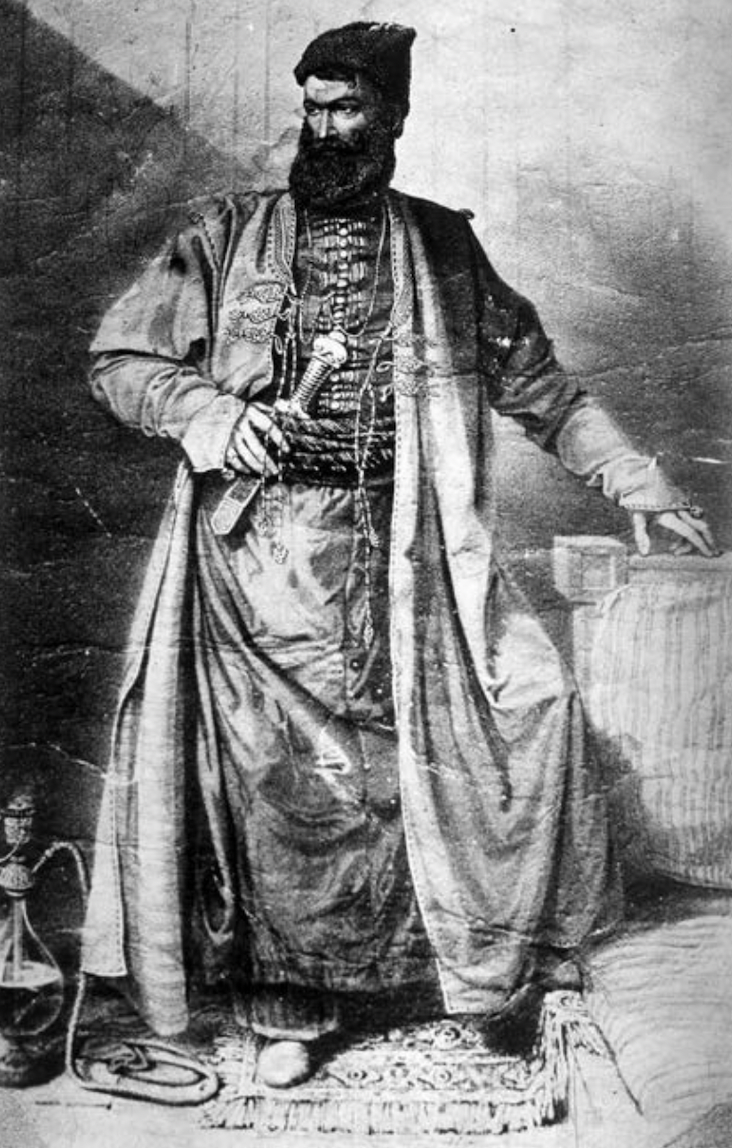
- Set Khan, seen here with jeweled dagger given to him by Ottoman Sultan Mahmud II

Envoy of Persia to Ottoman court
- In office 1828
- Monarch: Fath-Ali Shah Qajar

Ambassador of Persia to the Court of St James's
- In office 1810
- Monarch: Fath-Ali Shah Qajar

Personal details
- Born: 1780
- Died: 1842 (aged 61–62) Tehran, Iran
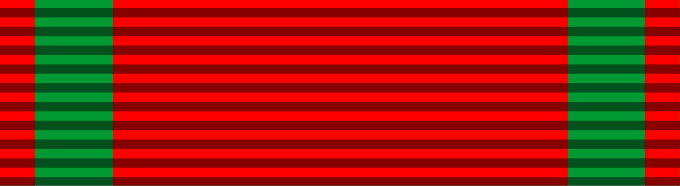
- Awards: Liakat Medal

Set Khan Astvatsatourian (Armenian: Սեթ խան Աստվածատրյան, Persian: ست خان آستواتساتوریان; c. 1780 – 1842) was an Iranian–Armenian businessman, Iran's ambassador to Great Britain, envoy to the Ottoman Empire, military advisor to Fath-Ali Shah, the second Qajar shah (king) of Iran. Set Khan played a leading role in the modernization of the Persian military, working with close friend Abbas Mirza, the Crown Prince of Iran, to reform the military during The Great Game. Set Khan is immortalized in stone holding his Ottoman-jeweled dagger within the "Asia Group" statuary at the Prince Albert Memorial in London's Hyde Park.

== Early life ==
Set was born to a family that was among the well-known Armenian and Georgian families brought to Iran during the reign of Agha Muhammad Khan Qajar, and dispersed throughout Iran for political reasons. Set learned the Armenian and Persian languages in the private school of the Armenian Church in Bushire. After receiving an education and learning the Armenian language, Set was sent at the age of thirteen to be educated in English at a school in Bombay, where he also learned Hindi. After completing his education, he worked for an English merchant in India.

== Career ==
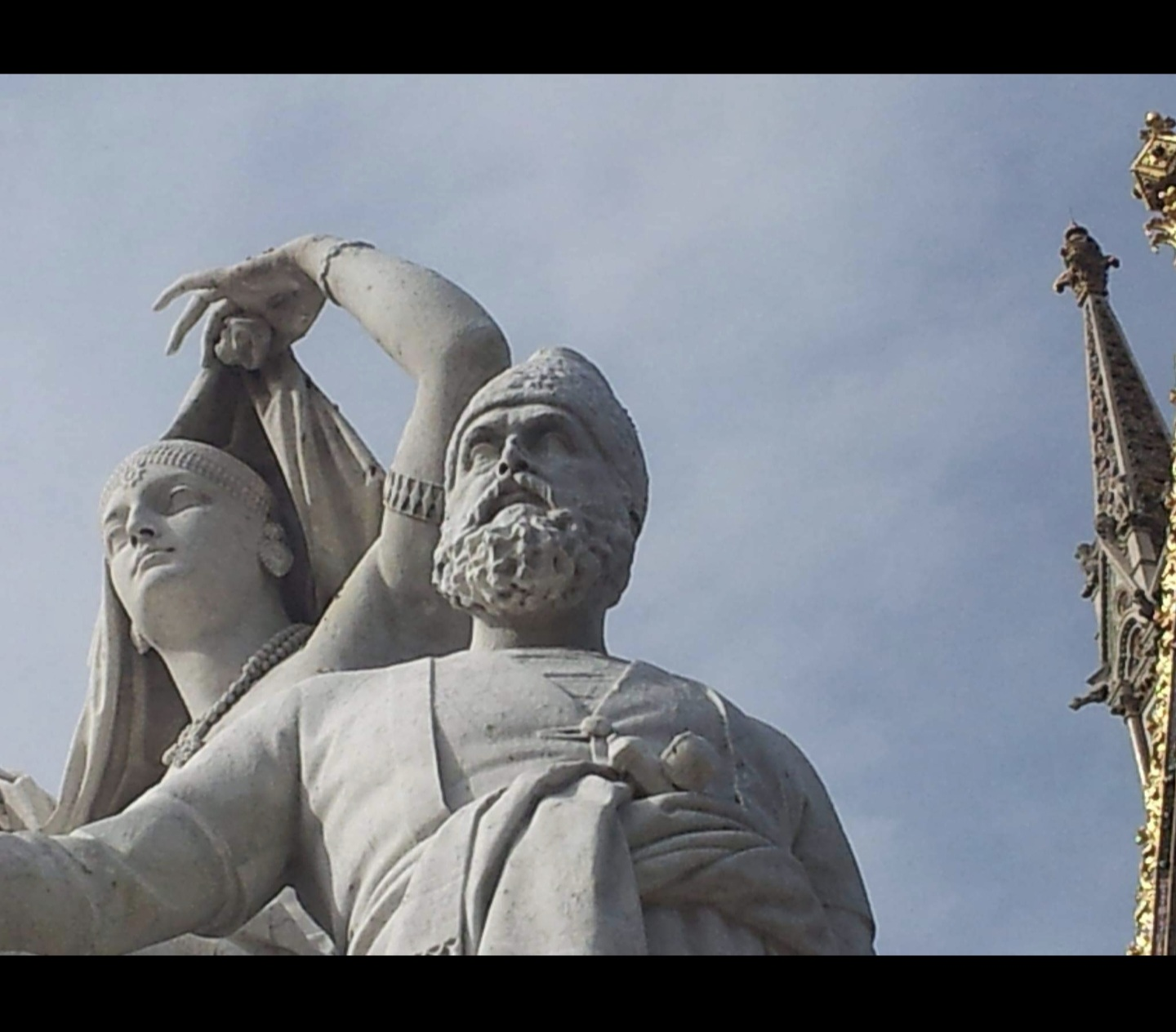
Set Khan in the "Asia Group" statuary at the Prince Albert

As a result of the rarity of multilingual individuals in Bushire, Set became the translator for the Ambassador of Great Britain, who was traveling to Iran to meet with Fath-Ali Shah and his court in Tehran. For his duties, Set was given the honorific title "Khan" and was henceforth known as "Set Khan".

=== Diplomatic service ===
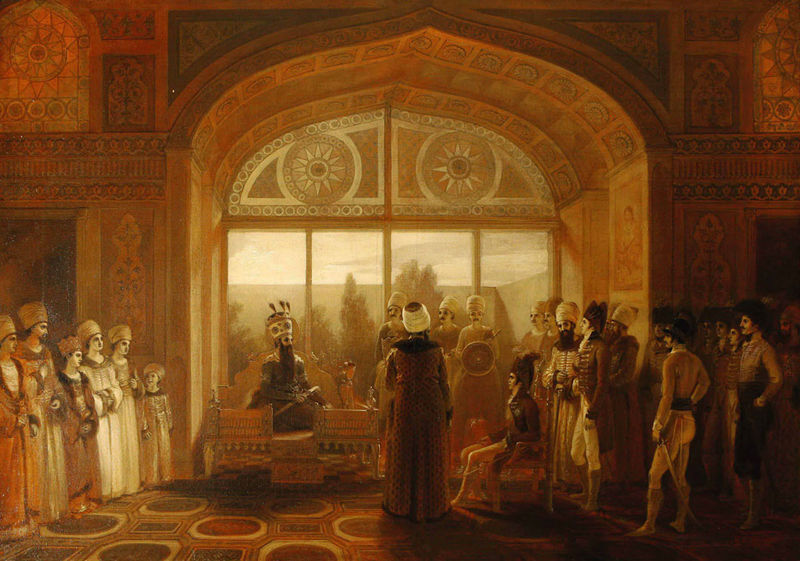
Set Khan translates for Sir Harford Jones (right) in the court of Fat’h Ali, the Shah of Persia, by Robert Smirke

In Tehran, Set Khan was asked to join the diplomatic service of the Qajar court, and in 1810 he travelled to London with the Persian ambassador to Great Britain to seek support from King George III against the growing ambitions of Russia and the influence of the French, as well as to ratify the Anglo-Persian Treaty.

For the next decade, Set Khan worked in the Qajar government in Tabriz. After returning to Iran, Set Khan again travelled to London, but this time as a military advisor alongside ambassador Mirza Saleh Shirazi. Following these initial trips to London, Set Khan took several additional trips to England in an ambassadorial capacity.

In 1828 Set Khan was selected to deliver a letter from Fath-Ali Shah to Ottoman Sultan Mahmud II, who honored him with a Liakat Medal , a jewel-studded dagger, the title bey, and the title of Sedghi Beig, which means the honest one. His mission was successful, and as a result, he earned the favor of Fath-Ali Shah, who issued two farmans as his reward.

==== Business and Persian military reforms ====
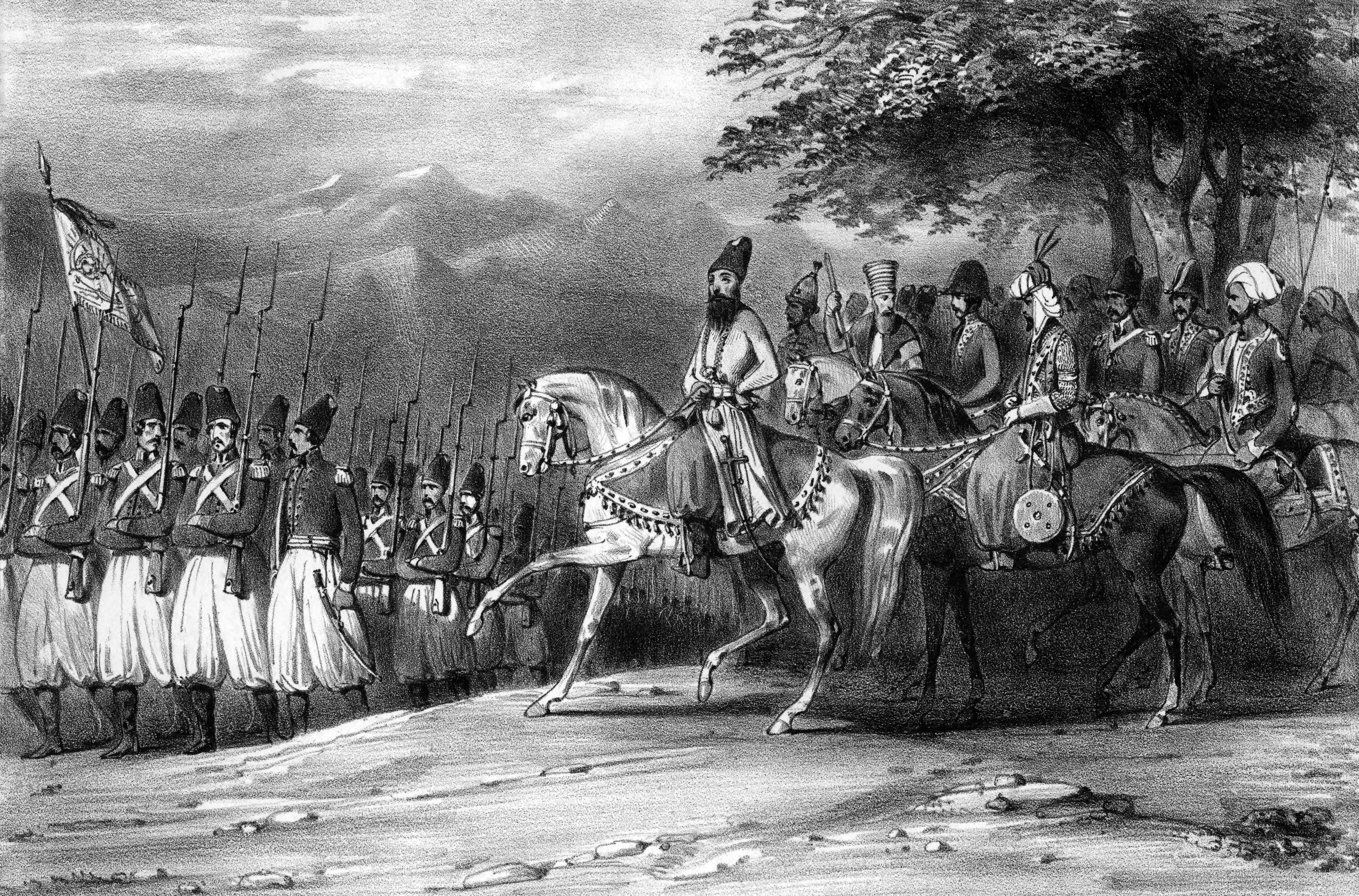
Reviewing in battle

Using the first farman issued to him from the Shah, as well as having obtained the exclusive rights to mine for twenty-one years, Set Khan began mining in the Minaeh and Garadagh regions of Azerbaijan circa 1830, which was the center of Persian military reform at the time under Crown Prince Abbas Mirza.

Set Khan travelled to London to contract experts to work on the excavations, and returned with two English mining experts and twenty Greek miners. With his new team, Set Khan successfully located and mined sites that produced silver, copper, and coal. The methods used by his team had never before been employed in the region, and were as a result particularly profitable. As copper was in high demand in Iran, Set Khan began to concentrate his efforts on cannon smelting, which was considered a breakthrough in Iranian military development. Dr. Hussein Mahbubi Ardakani, an Iranian historian, writer, and intellectual, in his book (The History of Civilizing New Establishments in Iran) has referred to Set Khan, "The honorable Set Khan the Christian last year has cast two 6 lb. cannons, tied them to wheels and has presented them to the Shah as an offering. The Shah in return has accorded him an income of 1500 Tumans. He has contracted to manufacture 84 guns to be delivered in six months to the royal court."

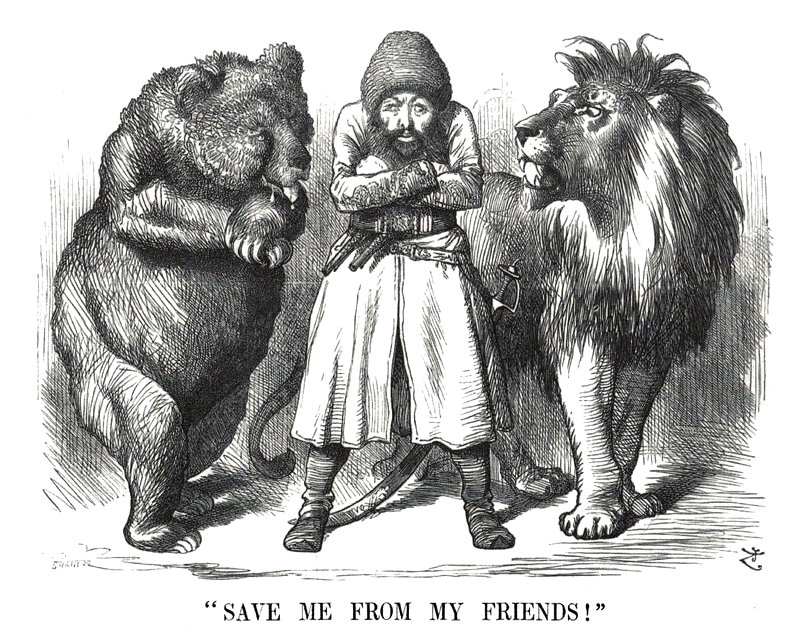
The Great Game

It was thought that the imperial powers of the West—Russia in the North and the British to the South—could be held at bay by the adoption of European education and military technology. In these conditions, Set Khan's exploitation of the copper mines of Azerbaijan can be seen as a major advancement for the Persian military reform effort because previously all significant quantities of copper for canon smelting had been imported from the Ottoman Empire. Set Khan was able to effectively meet the Qajar government's need for domestic weapons production.

The army's transformation was significant as can be seen from the Battle of Erzurum (1821) where the new army scored a crushing defeat against the Ottoman army. This resulted in the Treaty of Erzurum whereby the Ottoman Empire acknowledged the existing border between the two empires. With the exceptions of the Russian and British militaries, the Qajar army of the time was unquestionably the most powerful in the region. Set Khan's involvement with this foundational phase of the modernization of the Persian army would initiate a century of his own and his descendants' leading role in the process.

== Personal life ==
Set was a close friend of Crown Prince Abbas Mirza, who affectionately referred to him as "Brother Set." In The Immortals by Alice Navasargian, it is noted that Set Khan wore beautifully tailored clothes, sported a thick beard and a well groomed appearance, and was known by the highest elements of British society, being associated with royalty and dignitaries. Set Khan and his wife Lady Zizi had a son named Tsatur Khan, and a grandson named Alexander Khan.

== Death ==
The death of the Crown Prince in 1833 was a personal blow to Set Khan, who lost a dear friend. He suffered increasingly hard times during the 1830s and died in Tehran in 1842. After the death of Set Khan and Abbas Mirza, military reforms in Qajar Iran were virtually halted for the next half-century. Firuz Kazemzadeh characterizes the next fifty years of development, "Under the rule of Mohammad Shah, the Persian army lost whatever effectiveness it had possessed in the previous reign."
