= Aleksei Rodionov =

Aleksei Rodionov may refer to:

- Aleksei Rodionov (cinematographer)
- Aleksei Rodionov (diplomat)
- Alexei Rodionov (general)
