= Antoin Sevruguin =

Iranian photographer of Qajar era

Antoin Sevruguin Khan
- آنتوان سورگین
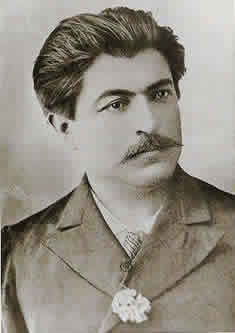
- Sevruguin in Vienna. Photo taken before 1880
- Born: 1851; Russian Embassy, Tehran, Sublime State of Iran
- Died: 1933 (aged 81–82); Tehran, Imperial State of Iran
- Resting place: Doulab Cemetery, Tehran
- Known for: Painting, photography
- Spouse: Louise Gourgenian
- Children: Seven, including André Sevruguin
- Patrons: Naser al-Din Shah

Antoin Sevruguin (Persian: آنتوان سورگین; 1851–1933), known as Antoin Khan (Persian: آنتوان خان) was an Iranian photographer of Armenian-Georgian descent, in Iran during the Qajar and Pahlavi eras.

== Early life ==
Born into a Russian family of Armenian-Georgian origin in the Russian embassy of Tehran, Iran: Antoin Sevruguin was one of the many children of Vasily Sevryugin and a Georgian "Ms. Ashin". Vasily Sevryugin (or Vassil de Sevruguin) was a Russian diplomat to Tehran. Achin had raised her children in Tbilisi, Georgia because she was denied her husband's pension. After Vassil died in a horse riding accident Antoin gave up the art form of painting and took up photography to support his family. His brothers Kolia and Emanuel helped him set up a studio in Tehran on Ala al-dawla Street (today Ferdowsi St.).

== Career ==
=== Practice and themes ===
Because Sevruguin travelled Persia and took pictures of the country, his travels record the Iran as it was in his time. Sevruguins pictures show Tehran as a small city. They show monuments, bridges and landscapes which have changed since then.

==== Royalty, nobility, and cultural figures ====
Antoin Sevruguin signature

Many of Antoin's photographs were taken from 1870 to 1930. Because Sevruguin spoke Persian as well as other languages, he was capable of communicating with different social strata and tribes from his country Iran. His photos of the royal court, the Qajar harem, mosques, and other religious monuments were compared to those of other Western photographers in Iran. Naser al-Din Shah Qajar (r. 1846–1896) took a special interest in photography, and many royal buildings and events were portrayed by Sevruguin.

==== Ethnographical photography ====
Some of Sevruguin's portraitures fed preexisting stereotypes of Easterners but had commercial value, and today, they are proven to be historical records of regional dress. Photographic studios in the nineteenth century advertised a type of picture known in French as "types". These were portraits of typical ethnic groups and their occupation. They informed the European viewer, unfamiliar with Persian culture, about the looks of regional dress, handcraft, religion, and professions. Photographing regional costumes was an accepted method of ethnological research in the nineteenth century. Many European ethnological museums bought Sevruguin portraiture to complement their scientific collection. Museums collected pictures of merchants in the bazaar, members of a Zurkhana (a wrestling arena), dervishes, gatherings of crowds to see the ta'ziyeh (Iranian dramatic presentation depicting the Passion of Shiite Imams), people engaged in Shiite rituals, and more. Sevruguin's portraits were also spread as postcards with the text: 'Types persans' (French for Persian types). Sevruguin was a photographer who had no boundaries in portraying people of all social classes and ethnic backgrounds. He portrayed members of the Iranian royal family as well as beggars, fellow countrymen of Iran or Westerners, farmers working fields, rug weavers at work, army officers, religious officials, Zoroastrians, Armenians, Lurs, Georgians, Kurds, Shasavan, Assyrians, and Gilak.

=== Sevruguin's Studio ===
Many Westerners who lived in Iran and travelers who visited the country brought back photographs from Antoin Sevruguin, often mentioning him in their travelogues of the time. Sevruguin's photographic studio, located on Avenue Ala al-Dawla, was one among several photographic studios on that street. Local residents could have their pictures taken in his studio, often posing in front of a painted backdrop. Most photographs were captured as glass negatives and printed as albumen prints. These prints frequently featured a logo with Sevruguin's name on one side. However, many 19th-century tourists found his name challenging to spell in Western languages, leading to various misspellings such as Sevraguine, Sevrugin, Sevriogin, Segruvian, and Serunian. Phonetically, his name was spelled "Sevr-joe-gien."

=== Vandalism ===
In 1908 the world was denied the rich collection of Sevruguin's images when Cossacks of Mohammad Ali Shah Qajar (r. 1907–1909) inadvertently bombed his store in suppression of Zahiru’d-Dawla, the constitutionalist Governor of Rasht. His house along with the whole street was burned.

Up to that point, Antoin had over 7000 photographs. Only 2000 were salvaged. As the photographs depicted numerous figures associated with the former Qajar regime and showed "conditions far removed from his own notions of a modern westernized nation", Reza Shah Pahlavi (r. 1925–1941) confiscated the remaining images.

== Legacy ==
After his death from a kidney infection, Sevruguin's images resurfaced. He was survived by seven children from his marriage to Louise Gourgenian.

In 1951–1952, an American historian of Iranian Islamic architecture, Myron Bement Smith, learned that 692 plates on glass by Sevrugian were up for sale at the American Presbyterian Mission in Tehran. Smith bought the images for USD 200, and when he died, his widow Katharine Smith donated the photo plates archive to the Smithsonian Institution. Only 696 of Sevruguin's negatives survive today.

The small exhibit curated by Massumeh Farhad, "Antoin Sevruguin and the Persian Image" (2001) was held at the Sackler Museum of Harvard University. The Runa Islam exhibition "Projects 95: Runa Islam" (2011) at the Museum of Modern Art (MoMA) featured the work "Emergence" (2011), that had been derived from one of Sevruguin's images.

== Gallery ==
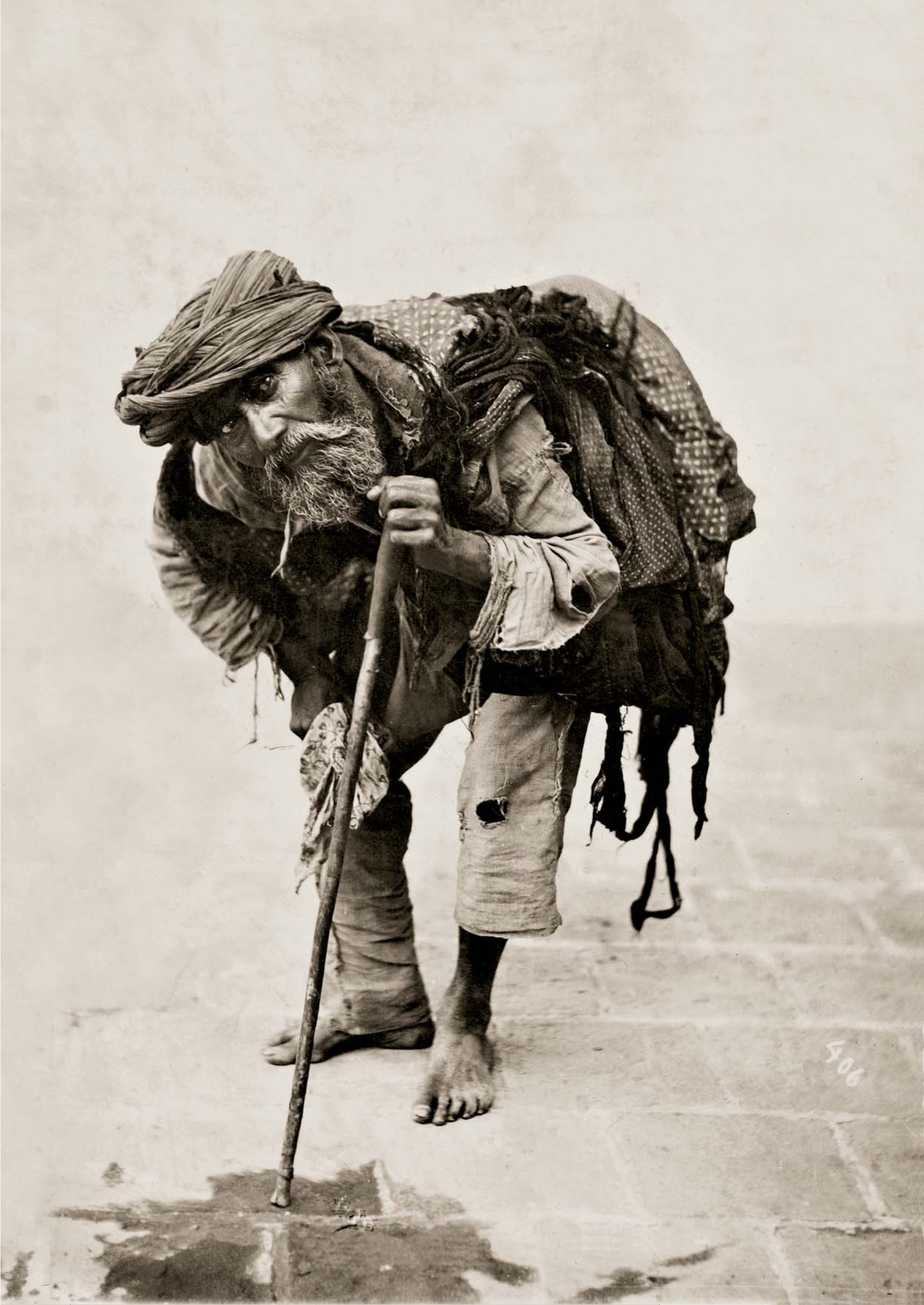
A beggar in Tehran

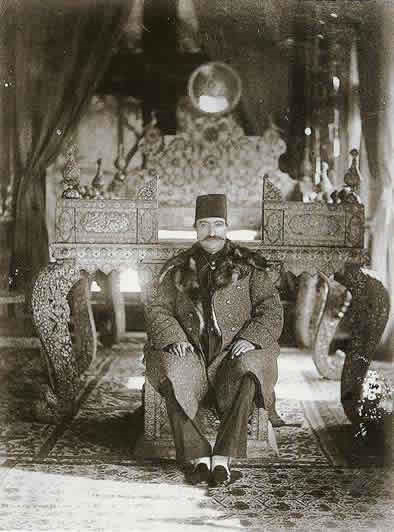
Naser al-Din Shah Qajar on the steps of the Sun Throne

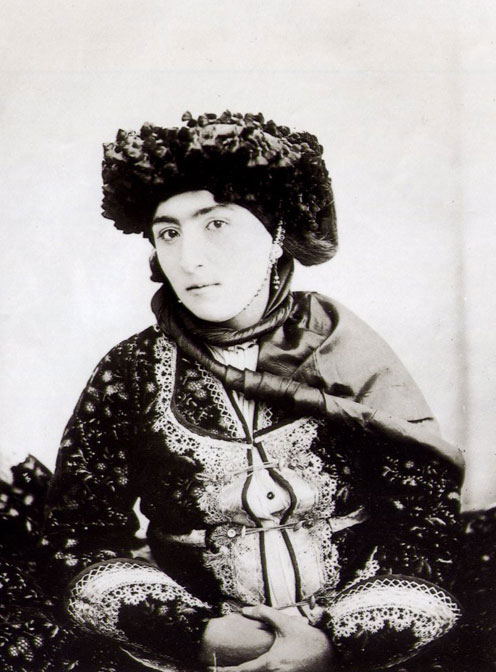
Kurdish woman, National Museum of Ethnology in Leiden, Netherlands

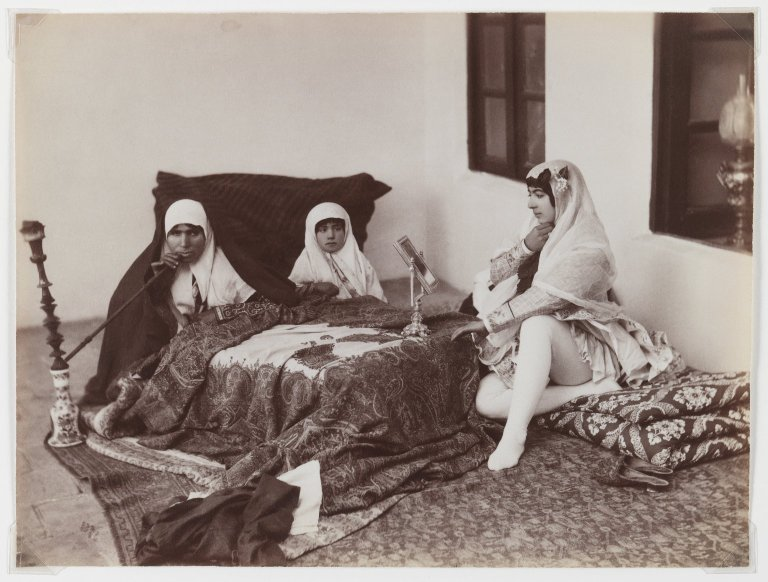
Two Ladies and a Child Reposing in the Harem, Brooklyn Museum

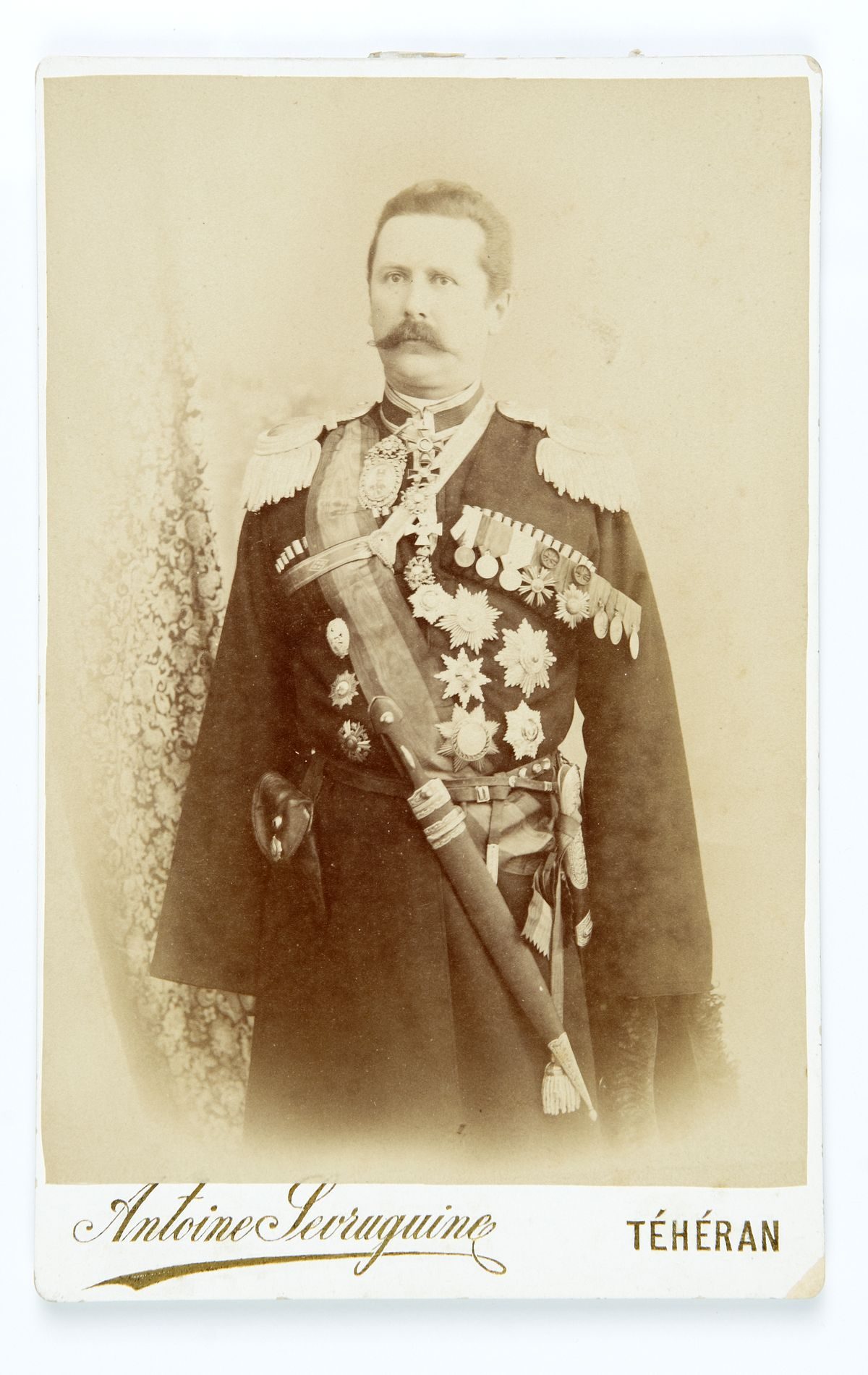
Vladimir Kossogovsky, commander of the Persian Cossack Brigade. Pictured in 1900, Tehran.

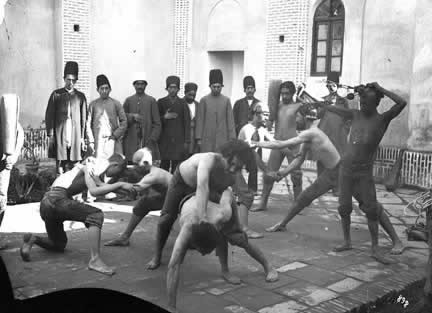
Pahlevani and zoorkhaneh rituals

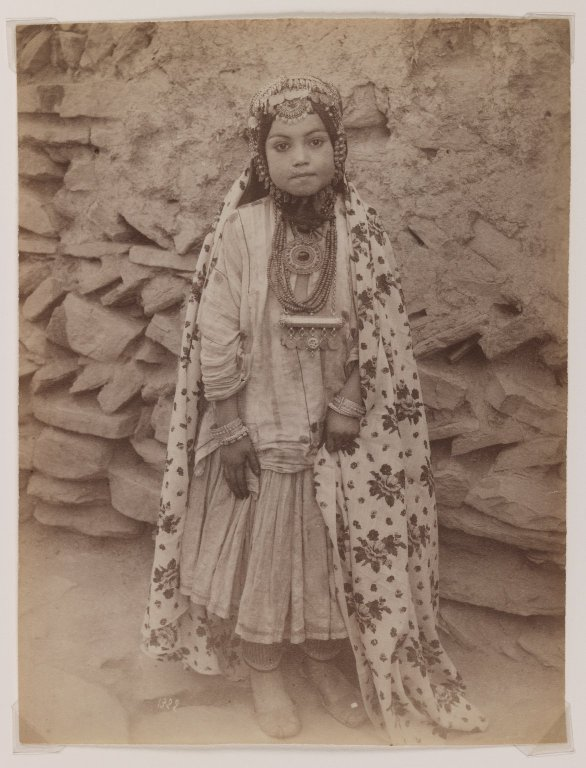
Girl Adorned in Silver Jewelry

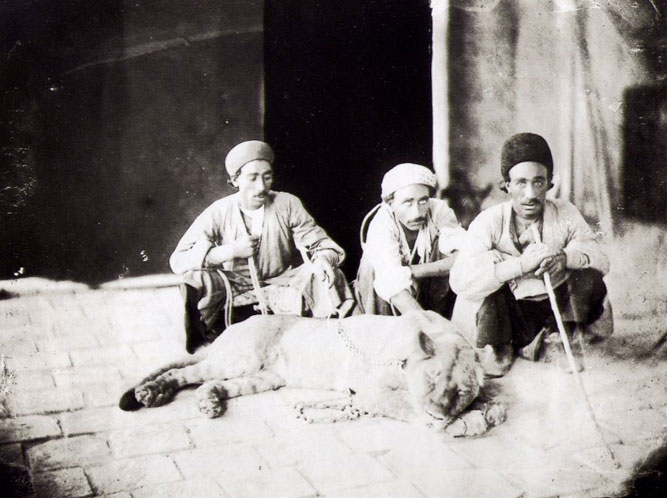
Men with a live lion in Iran.

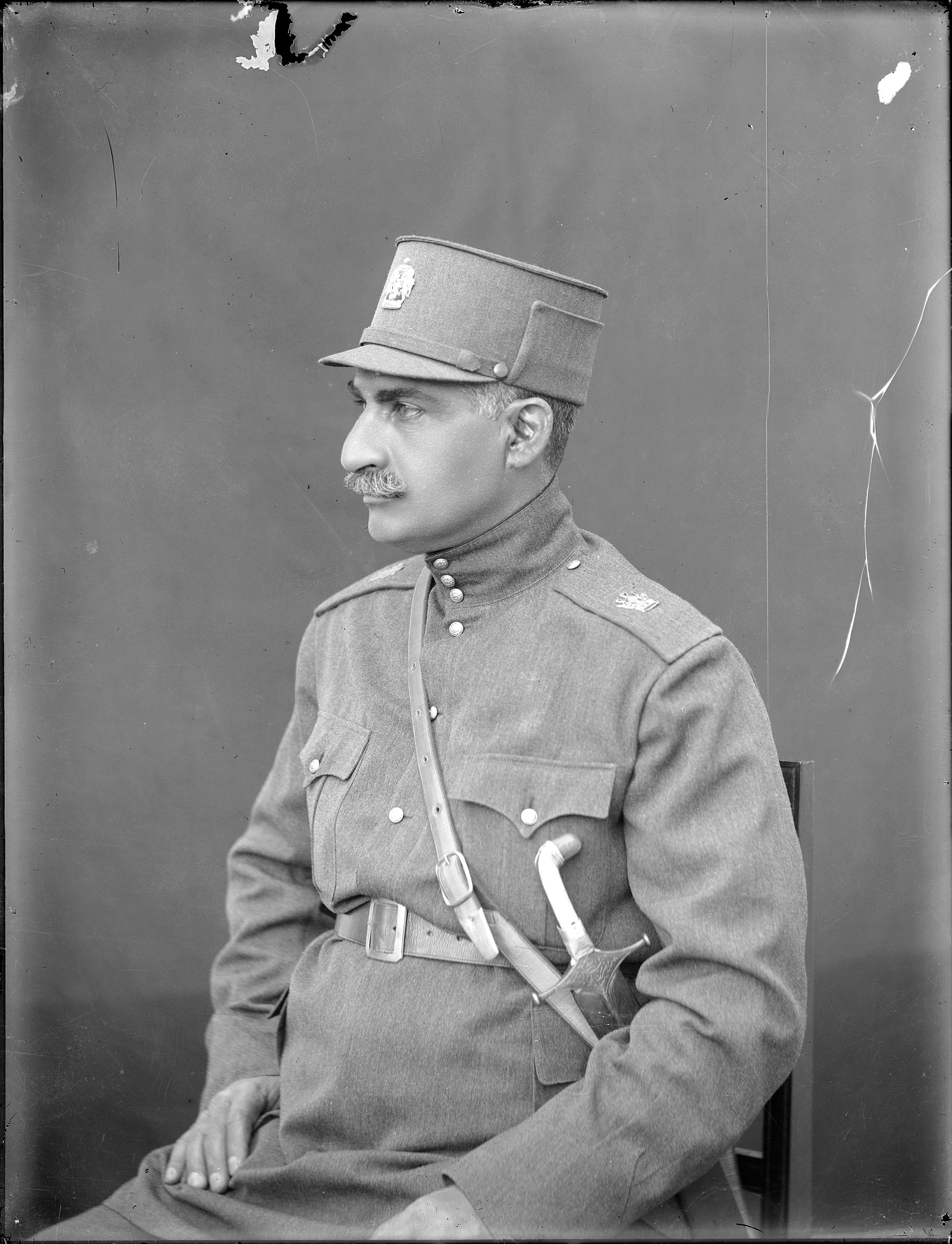
Reza Khan (later Reza Shah) as Qajar Iran's War Minister

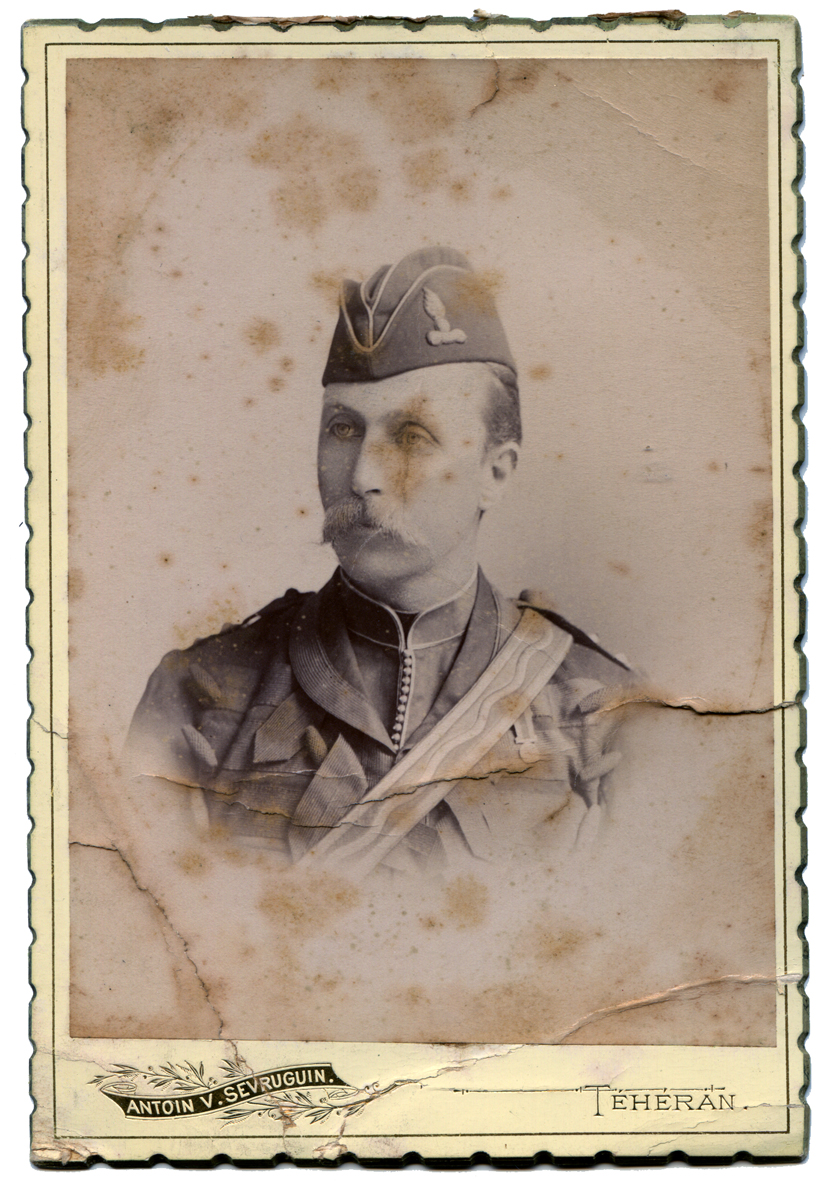
Arthur Churchill Bailward

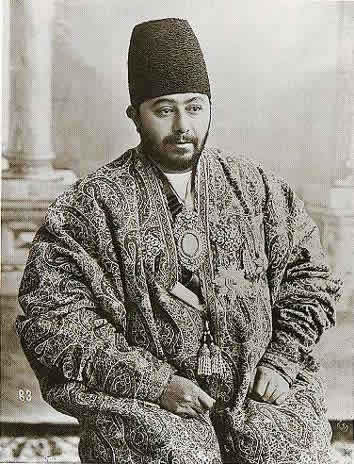
Niẓām al-Mulk

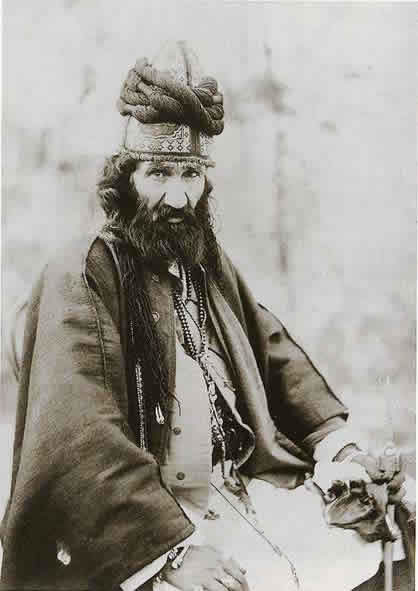
Dervish

== Sources ==
- L.A. Ferydoun Barjesteh van Waalwijk van Doorn, Gillian M. Vogelsang-Eastwood (eds.), Sevruguin's Iran / Iran az negah Sevruguin, Late nineteenth century photographs of Iran from the National Museum of Ethnology in Leiden, Netherlands, Teheran/Rotterdam 1378/1999.
- Bohrer, Frederick N., ED. Sevruguin and the Persian Image. London: University of Washington Press, 1999.
- Iraj Afshar, ‘Some remarks on the early history of photography in Iran’ in Qajar Iran; political, social and cultural change, 1800-1925, E.Bosworth, C. Hillenbrand (eds.), Edinburgh 1983, pp. 262–2.
- Iraj Afshar, Ganjine-ye aks-haye Iran. hamrah-e tarikhche-ye vorud-e akkasi be Iran, A treasury of early Iranian Photographs together with a concise account of how photography was first introduced in Iran, Teheran 1371/1992.
- Exhibition of Antoin Sevruguin's Photographs (Archived 2009-10-25) at geocities.com
- Myron Bement Smith Collection, Subseries 2.12: Antoin Sevruguin Photographs
- Stephen Arpee Collection of Sevruguin Photographs
