= Aleksey Domantovich =

Cossack commander active in Persia (1846–1908)

- Born: March 10, 1846
- Died: 1908 (aged 61–62)
- Military career
- Allegiance: Russian Empire
- Branch: Imperial Russian Army
- Rank: General
- Unit: 38th Infantry Division (Russian Empire)
- Commands: Persian Cossack Brigade; 1st Brigade, 1st Caucasus Cossack Division; 1st Caucasus Cossack Division (Russian Empire); 2nd Combined Cossack Division (Russian Empire)

Aleksey Domantovich (March 10, 1846 – 1908) was a Russian general and the commander of the Persian Cossack Brigade.

== Biography ==
Domontovich was born on March 10, 1846, in a family of Kuban Cossacks, who came from an old Zaporozhye family; He was educated in the 2nd Moscow Cadet Corps (1863) and in the Alexander Military and Mikhailovsky Artillery Schools.

In 1864, the corps of the Kuban Cossack army was released from the Aleksanrovsky School of the Coroon into the equestrian artillery No. 11. In 1872, Domontovich entered the Nikolayev Academy of the General Staff, after which in 1875 he was promoted to captain, transferred to the General Staff, and appointed senior adjutant to the headquarters of the 38th Infantry Division (Russian Empire).

At the end of 1876, Domontovich was sent to the disposal of the chief of the Erivan detachment, Lieutenant General Tergukasov, with whom he took part in the occupation of Bayazet, Diadin, Surp-Oganez and Big Karakilisa, in the battles on the Drum-Dagh Heights and at Dayar and in the movement of Erivan squad to the rescue of the Bayazet garrison surrounded by the enemy, as well as in the battles of Igdir and Deva Boynu. For military distinctions, Domontovich was awarded the Order of St. Vladimir 4th degree with swords and bow (for Dram-Dag), the rank of lieutenant colonel (for Dayar), Order of Saint Stanislaus (House of Romanov) 2nd degree with swords (for Virgo Boyna) and Order of St. George 4th degree (December 23, 1878). “In retribution for the difference made in the case with the Turks on September 15, 1877, where, correcting the position of the Chief of Staff of the troops (right flank of the Erivan detachment) located near the villages of Khosh-Khabar and Charukhchi, seeing the enemy’s intention to cover both flanks of our detachment, he gave very useful advice, as a result of which the enemy, himself unexpectedly attacked from the flanks, began to retreat in disarray and suffered huge losses. "

Appointed at the end of the war as the chief officer for special assignments at the headquarters of the Caucasian military district, Domontovich was sent to Persia in November 1878, where, at the request of the Persian government, he examined the local troops and made proposals for improving the armed forces of Persia. On February 7, 1879, Domontovich signed a contract with the Persian government on the terms of the invitation on a permanent basis of the Russian military mission and on the organization of the Persian Cossack brigade. Domontovich himself was appointed head of the mission and commander of this brigade. In 1880, he was promoted to colonel and was in Persia until 1882. Based on the results of his work in Persia, Domontovich left interesting notes, in “Memoirs of the First Russian Military Mission in Persia,” published in the journal Russian Antiquity (No. 1-4, 1908).

In 1885, Domontovich was appointed chief of staff of the Caucasus Cavalry Division (Russian Empire), and in 1886 - commander of the 1st Gorsko-Mozdok equestrian regiment of the Tersky Cossack army.

In 1893, Domontovich was promoted to major general and appointed commander of the 1st Brigade of the 1st Caucasus Cossack Division (Russian Empire) with enrollment in the Terek Cossack Army. In 1894 he was appointed commander of the 2nd Brigade of the 2nd Combined Cossack Division (Russian Empire) and in 1898 - commander of the 1st Caucasus Cossack Division (Russian Empire). In 1899 he was enlisted in the lists of the General Staff and received the command of the 2nd Combined Cossack Division (Russian Empire). In 1900 he was promoted to lieutenant general, in 1904 appointed to the position of the Minister of War, and in 1906 promoted to general from the cavalry, with dismissal due to illness from service. He died in 1908.

Military offices
Preceded by unit established	Commander of the Persian Cossack Brigade; 1879-1882	Succeeded by
Preceded by	Commander of the 1st Brigade, 1st Caucasus Cossack Division; 1893-1894	Succeeded by
Preceded by	Commander of the 1st Caucasus Cossack Division; 1898-1899	Succeeded by
Preceded by	Commander of the 2nd Combined Cossack Division; 1899-1904	Succeeded by

== Sources ==
- Military Encyclopedia / Ed. V.F. Novitsky et al. - St. Petersburg: production of I.V. Sytin, 1911-1915.
- Volkov S.V. Generality of the Russian Empire. Encyclopedic dictionary of generals and admirals from Peter I to Nicholas II. Volume I. AK. M., 2009
- Glinotsky N.P. Historical outline of the Nikolaev Academy of the General Staff. SPb., 1882
- Krasnyak O. A. Formation of the Iranian regular army in 1879-1921. Based on materials from the archives of the Russian military mission. M., 2007
- List to seniority generals. Done on September 1, 1905. - St. Petersburg: Military printing house (in the building of the General Staff Building), 1905. - P. 366.
