= André Sevruguin =

Iranian-Armenian painter (1896–1996)

- آندره سوریوگین
- Born: Անդրե Սևրուկյան; 2 May 1896; Tehran, Sublime State of Iran
- Died: 18 December 1996 (aged 100); Stuttgart, Germany
- Other name: André Sevruguin
- Occupation: Visual Artist
- Title: Darvish
- Parents: Antoin Sevruguin (father); Louise Gourgenian (mother)

André Sevruguin (2 May 1896, Tehran – 18 December 1996, Stuttgart; Persian: آندره سوریوگین; Armenian: Անդրե Սևրուկյան ), known as Darvish (Persian: درویش; Armenian: Դարվիշ), was a prominent Iranian-Armenian miniature painter of a Georgian descent, and one of the well-known figures in Iranian painting, particularly known for his coffeehouse paintings.

== Biography ==
Sevruguin, known as Darvish, was the son of Antoin Sevruguin, a prominent Iranian photographer, and Louise Gourgenian.

He completed his education in Tehran, at St. Louis School and later worked as an educator at the same institution. After a period of teaching, he devoted his life to painting.

Following years of work in Iran, Sevruguin moved to Vienna and eventually settled in Germany.

Sevruguin spent nine years in seclusion, deeply immersed in the works of Ferdowsi, creating 416 paintings inspired by Ferdowsi's Shahnameh, aligning with the anniversary of the poet's death. When Ferdowsi's millennium was first celebrated in India, Sevruguin's miniatures, published as a nine-volume collection in Iran, were sent to India for an exhibition. Unfortunately, some of these works never returned.

His first exhibition brought him fame and caught the attention of several writers and artists of the time. In the 1940s, he had close friendships with many Iranian intellectuals and artists, such as Sadegh Hedayat.

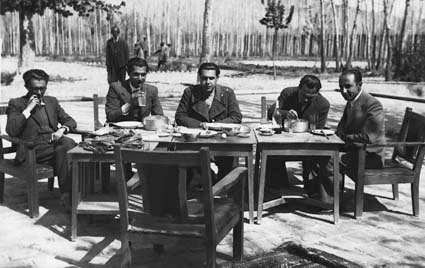
Andre Sevruguin, Mojtaba Minovi, Gholamhosein MInbashian, Masoud Farzad, and Sadegh Hedayat, Suburbs of Tehran, circa 1930

Sevruguin's style and approach to depicting subjects were distinct from any traditional or contemporary styles of Shahnameh illustrations. He fused the Persian miniature techniques of Safavid-era masters, like Kamal-ud-Din Behzad and Reza Abbasi, with modern painting techniques, producing highly valuable works.

A year after his first exhibition in Tehran, Sevruguin traveled to India and organized an exhibition of his works in Calcutta. His works were so well received by the ruler of Hyderabad that he purchased several of them. Buoyed by this material and spiritual encouragement, Sevruguin returned to Tehran and created additional paintings based on the Rubaiyat of Omar Khayyam and Hafez Shirazi.

He held numerous exhibitions in cities such as Vienna, Berlin, Brussels, Paris, and London, achieving success as an Iranian miniaturist and gaining international fame. His works are now housed in various museums worldwide including Tehran Museum of Contemporary art, Museum der Weltkulturen, Armenian Museum in America and National Museum of Armenia.

Sevruguin died in 1996, aged 100, in Stuttgart, Germany.

== See also ==
- Iranian Georgians
