= 2nd Combined Cossack Division =

- Active: 1889–1918
- Allegiance: Russian Empire
- Branch: Imperial Russian Army
- Garrison/HQ: Kamenets-Podolsk
- Engagements: World War I

The 2nd Combined Cossack Division (Russian: 2-я Сводная казачья дивизия) was a Cossack division in the Russian Imperial Army formed from Don, Kuban, and Terek Cossacks. Before the war it was part of the 12th Army Corps in the Kiev Military District. The division saw action in World War I and was demobilized in 1918.

== Order of battle in 1914 ==
The division consisted of the following units:

- 1st Brigade (HQ Mogilev-Podolsk)
  - 16th Don Cossack Regiment
  - 17th Don Cossack Regiment
- 2nd Brigade (HQ Kamenets-Podolsk)
  - 1st Kuban Cossack Line Regiment
  - 1st Terek Cossack Volgsky Regiment
- 1st Orenburg Cossack Horse Artillery Division (HQ Kamenets-Podolsk)
  - 1st Orenburg Cossack Horse Artillery Battery
  - 3rd Orenburg Cossack Horse Artillery Battery

== Commanders ==
The following is the list of the division commanders.

- 28.07.1899 – 14.09.1904 – Major General (later Lieutenant General) Alexei Domontovich
- 14.10.1906 – xx.11.1907 – Major General (later Lieutenant General) Mikhail Stoyanov
- 19.11.1907 – 14.09.1911 – Lieutenant General Nikolai Avdeyev
- 14.09.1911 – 31.12.1913 – Lieutenant General Alexei Rodionov
- 31.12.1913 – 24.09.1914 – Lieutenant General Leonid Zhigalin
- 24.09.1914 – 10.09.1915 – Lieutenant General Alexander Pavlov
- 16.09.1915 – 10.06.1917 – Major General Pyotr Krasnov
- 26.09.1917 – ? – Major General Alexander Cheryachukin

== Chiefs of Staff ==
The following is a list of the division chiefs of staff.

- 15.09.1889-02.08.1891 — Colonel Dmitry Voronets
- 15.11.1894-30.12.1899 — Colonel Pavel Parchevsky
- 22.02.1900-25.05.1900 — Colonel Ivan Tolmachev
- 25.07.1900-09.02.1902 — Colonel Vladimir Khitrovo
- 16.02.1902-06.03.1905 — Lieutenant Colonel (later Colonel) Mikhail Shishkevich
- 25.03.1905-09.07.1908 — Colonel Ivan Bolotov
- 25.08.1908-02.09.1910 — Colonel Anatoly Kalishevsky
- 12.09.1910-30.12.1914 — Colonel Andrei Snesarev
- ?-26.07.1915 — Colonel Vladimir Agapeyev
- 16.08.1915-21.03.1917 — Lieutenant Colonel (later Colonel) Svyatoslav Denisov
- 16.05.1917-? — Nikolai Rot
