= Vladimir Shokorov =

Russian soldier (1868–1940)

Vladimir Nikolaevich Shokorov
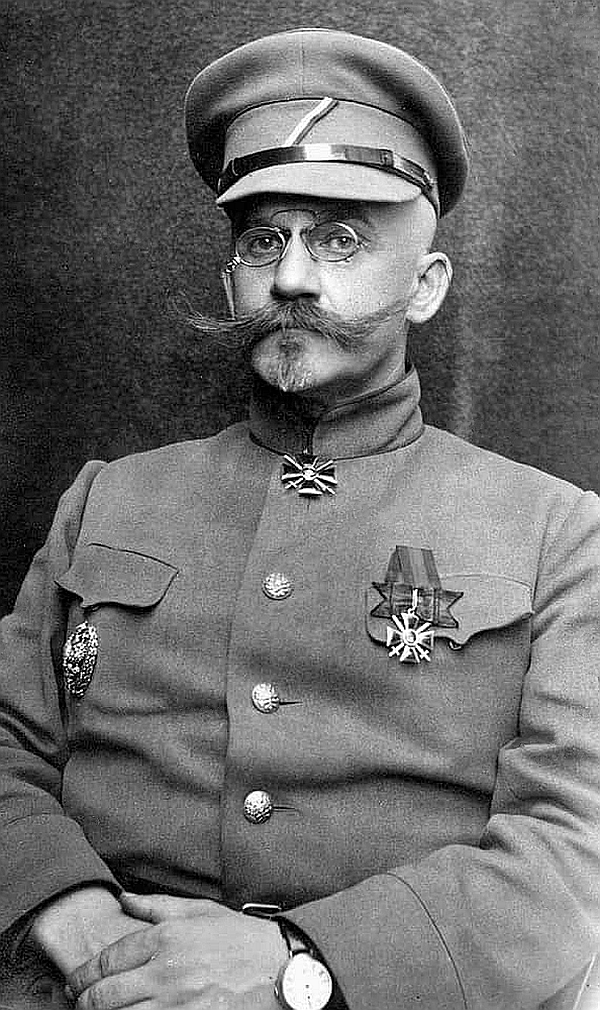
- Born: 1868
- Died: 1940 (aged 71–72)
- Allegiance: Russia

Vladimir Nikolaevich Shokorov (1868–1940) was a Russian soldier active in the First World War and the Russian Civil War.

On 26 September 1917 General Nikolay Dukhonin appointed him commander of the Czechoslovak corps.

Military offices
Preceded by Dmitry Prikhodkin	Chief of Staff of the 12th Infantry Division; 1916–1917	Succeeded by Andrei Snesarev
