= 2nd Caucasian Cavalry Corps =

- Country: Russian Empire
- Allegiance: Imperial Russian Army
- Engagements: First World War

The 2nd Caucasian Cavalry Corps (Russian: 2-й Кавказский кавалерийский корпус) was a military formation of the Russian Empire during the First World War, from 1 August 1916 to 1 February 1917, and was part of the Russian Caucasian Army.

== Part of ==
- Russian Caucasian Army: 1 August 1916 – 1 February 1917

== Commanders ==
- Lieutenant General Fyodor Chernozubov: 1916 – 1917
- Lieutenant General A. A. Pavlov: 1917
- Lieutenant General Nikolai Baratov: 1917
