= Alexander Cheryachukin =

Alexander Vasilevich Cheryachukin
- Born: 1872
- Died: May 12, 1944 (aged 71–72) Nice, France
- Allegiance: Russian Empire; White movement (Don Republic)
- Branch: Imperial Russian Army; Don Army
- Commands: 2nd Combined Cossack Division (Russian Empire)
- Conflicts: World War I Russian Civil War

Alexander Vasilevich Cheryachukin (1872 - May 12, 1944) was a Russian general, St. George cavalier, and member of the White movement. During the years of the Russian Civil War, he represented the interests of the Great Don Army in the face of the German armed forces.

== Biography ==
=== Origin, education, pre-war service ===
He was born on March 18, 1873, in the village of Bogoyavlenskaya in the Pirozhskovsky farm. From the noblemen of the Don Army, he was the son of an official.

After graduating from the Don Cadet Corps on September 5, 1890, he entered the Mikhailovsky Artillery School. He was released in the 6th Life Guards Don Cossack Battery. On August 7, 1893, he was promoted to ensign; on August 7, 1897, he was promoted to sotnik.

In 1899 he graduated from the Nikolaev Academy of the General Staff in the 1st category. For his success in science, on June 6, 1899, he was promoted to captain with renaming as captain of the General Staff. Appointed to be at the headquarters of the Kiev military district.

From November 11, 1901, to November 11, 1902, the squadron qualified command passed in the 28th Novgorod Dragoon Regiment. November 21, 1902, he was appointed chief officer for special assignments at the headquarters of the 12th Army Corps. From March 17, 1904, he held the post of chief of the combat unit headquarters of the Kronstadt fortress. March 28, 1904, promoted to lieutenant colonel, December 6, 1908 - colonel.

On March 1, 1910, he was appointed chief of staff of the 10th Cavalry Division. December 11, 1913, received the command of the 11th Don Cossack Regiment.

=== World War I ===
He went to the front at the head of the 11th Don Cossack Regiment. At the beginning of 1915 he was appointed commander of the 2nd Zaamursky border cavalry brigade, with which on May 25, 1915, he stopped the Austro-German troops, threatening the encirclement of the 2nd cavalry corps with a horse attack in the area of Zaleshchikov (Galicia). For this case, by the Highest Order of December 30, 1915, he was awarded the Order of St. George 4th degree.

On June 16, 1915, he was appointed chief of staff of the 4th Cavalry Corps (Russian Empire), in this position he was until the fall of 1917. December 6, 1915, was promoted to major general. Highest Order of June 20, 1916, awarded the St. George's Arms

On September 25, 1917, he headed the 2nd Combined Cossack Division (Russian Empire), which he brought to the Don at the end of the year.

=== Civil War ===
On the Don, General Kaledin was appointed commander of the Western Front. After the death of Kaledin and the occupation by the Reds of the entire Don Cossack Region, he hid in the vicinity of the village of Grushevskaya.

In the spring of 1918 he took part in the general anti-Bolshevik uprising on the Don. In May 1918 he was sent by General Krasnov to Kiev as a permanent plenipotentiary representative of the Don Cossack army under Hetman Skoropadsky.

With the direct efforts of Cheryachukin, considerable stocks of weapons and ammunition were sent from Ukraine to the Don, some of which were transferred to the Volunteer Army.

In July-September 1918 Cheryachukin accompanied the Duke of Leuchtenberg to the Emperor Wilhelm II. Thanks to A. V. Cheryachukin, several hundred Russian officers captured by the Petliurists in Kiev were evacuated to Germany.

September 30, 1918, promoted to lieutenant general. Since December 1918 he was the ambassador of the Great Don Army in Poland.

In March 1920 he was appointed head of the Don Cadet Corps. Evacuated the corps to Egypt.

=== Exile ===
In 1922 he was with the cadet corps in Bulgaria. After the disbandment of the corps in 1923, he left for France. Lived in Paris, worked at the Panard automobile plant as a draftsman.

A. V. Cheryachukin played a prominent role in the social activities of the Russian emigration. Until 1930, he was chairman of the Union of Don Artillerymen in Paris. Voluntarily abandoned this honorable post and was relieved of it by order of General E.K. Miller in September 1930. He was the deputy of the Don Ataman, General A.P. Bogaevsky, and after his death he was one of the candidates for this post and headed the commission to perpetuate memory. He was chairman of the editorial board of the journal "Ataman Herald" (Paris, 1935-1939).

During the Second World War he left for Nice, where he died on May 12, 1944. Buried in the Russian cemetery Kokad.

== Awards ==
- Order of St. Stanislav 3rd degree (1901)
- Order of St. Anna, 3rd degree (1904)
- Order of St. Stanislav 2nd degree (1906)
- Order of Saint Anna, 2nd degree (1911)
- Order of Saint George 4th degree (December 30, 1915)
- St. George's Arms (June 20, 1916)

Military offices
Preceded by	Commander of the 2nd Combined Cossack Division; 1917	Succeeded by
