= Fyodor Chernozubov =

Russian general (1863–1919)

Fyodor Grigoryevich Chernozubov
- Born: September 15, 1863
- Died: November 14, 1919 (aged 56)
- Military career
- Allegiance: Russian Empire
- Branch: Imperial Russian Army
- Rank: lieutenant general
- Unit: 1st Caucasus Cossack Division (Russian Empire)
- Commands: Persian Cossack Brigade
- Conflicts: World War I; Persian Campaign

Fyodor Grigoryevich Chernozubov (14 September 1863 – 14 November 1919; sometimes seen as Theodore G. Chernozubov) was an Imperial Russian Army officer who became lieutenant general on 20 February 1915. His father was Grigori Chernozubov. He was trained at the Page Corps and later the Imperial General Staff Academy in 1889.

He became Chief of Staff of the 1st Caucasus Cossack Division from 17 April 1901 to 10 December 1902 at the Russian Caucasus Army. He was assigned Chief troops Caucasia on 10 December 1902. Between 30 July 1902 to 1 June 1906, he was the head of the cavalry training of Persian Cossack Brigade. He was appointed Chief of Staff of the Terek Cossacks on 26 November 1908.

From 4 July 1916, he commanded the 2nd Caucasian Cavalry Corps, and showed himself as a talented commander. After the February Revolution, he was removed from office during the cleansing of top military staff.

He published several articles on military intelligence.
