= Andrei Snesarev =

Russian and Soviet military personnel (1865–1937)

Andrei Evgenyevich Snesarev
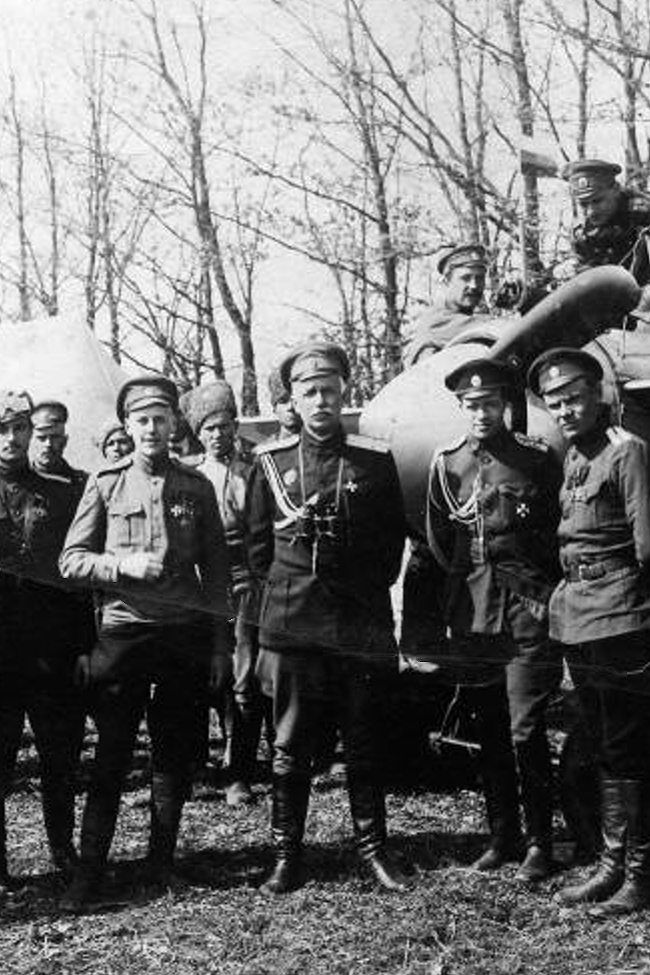
- Andrei Snesarev, inspecting the 7th fighter squadron on the eastern front, approximately March 1917, during the First World War. Ivan Orlov on the right
- Born: 13 December 1865; Staraya Kalitva, Russian Empire
- Died: 4 December 1937 (aged 71); Moscow, Soviet Union
- Military career
- Allegiance: Russian Empire (1888–1917); (Russian Socialist Federative Soviet Republic) Soviet Russia (1918–22); (Soviet Union) Soviet Union (1922–1928)
- Branch: Imperial Russian Army; Red Army
- Rank: Lieutenant General
- Unit: 2nd Combined Cossack Division
- Commands: 9th Army Corps (Russian Empire)
- Conflicts: World War I Russian Civil War

Andrei Evgenyevich Snesarev (Russian: Андрей Евгеньевич Снесарев; 13 December 1865 – 4 December 1937) was a Russian linguist, orientalist and military leader.

Andrei was the son of a Russian Orthodox priest. After attending gymnasium school in Novocherkassk in 1888, he began studying mathematics at Moscow University. As part of his obligatory military service, he received a commission in the infantry after a period at the Alekseyevsky Junkers Infantry Academy. He soon decided on a military career and attended the Nicholas General Staff Academy. He was then sent to India and also studied at the British Museum, London.

An English translation of his book Afghanistan, published in 1921, was released in England in 1924. The book consists of a written version of the lectures he delivered to the Oriental Section of the Military Academy of the Red Army between autumn 1919 and spring 1920.

In 1910, he became Chief of Staff of the 2nd Combined Cossack Division.

== Final Years and Death ==
In 1930, Snesarev was arrested and charged with participating in counter-revolutionary activities. He was imprisoned in Butyrka Prison then Lubyanka Prison. He was tried, found guilty, and sentenced to death. However, Stalin intervened and had his sentenced reduced to ten years imprisonment in the Gulag camp system, first at Svir, then at Solovki prison camp.

He suffered a severe stroke in 1933 which left him partially paralyzed. He was later taken to Leningrad by his family to receive better medical care and released on parole in September, 1934. He suffered two more strokes and died at a Moscow hospital in December 1937.

He was re-habilitated in 1958.

Military offices
Preceded by	Chief of Staff of the 2nd Combined Cossack Division; 1910–1914	Succeeded by
Preceded by Vladimir Shokorov	Chief of Staff of the 12th Infantry Division; 1916–1917	Succeeded by
Preceded by	Commander of the 9th Army Corps; September – November 1917	Succeeded by
Preceded by	Head of the Frunze Military Academy; 1919–1921	Succeeded by
