= Vladimir Kossogovsky =

Vladimir Andreyvich Kossogovsky Владимир Андреевич Косоговский
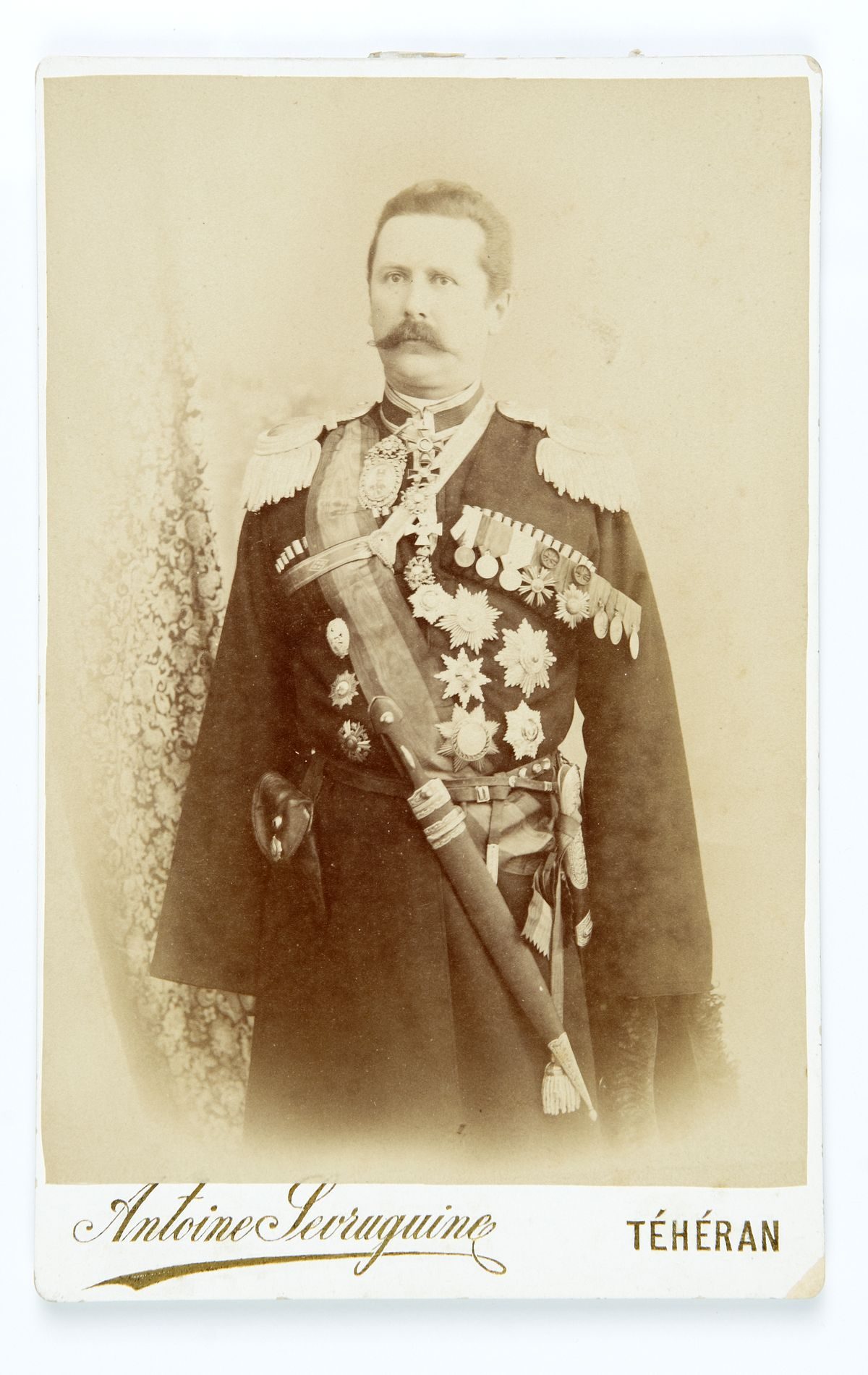
- Kossogovski in 1900, Teheran. Pictured by Antoin Sevruguin.
- Born: 14 January 1857; Lakeside Valdai area of the Novgorod Governorate, Russian Empire
- Died: 12 September 1918 (age 61)
- Military career
- Allegiance: Russian Empire
- Branch: Caucasian line Imperial Russia
- Rank: General Staff; Lieutenant General
- Commands: Persian Cossack Brigade; Siberian Cossack Division; Priamurskaya Cossack Brigade
- Conflicts: Russo-Turkish War; Russo-Japanese War

Vladimir Andreyvich Kossogovsky (14 January 1857 – 12 September 1918) was a Russian Lieutenant-General, commander of the Persian Cossack Brigade, and a member of the General Staff of the Imperial Russian Army.

== Biography ==
Kossogovsky was educated at the first Moscow military school, the St. Nicholas Cavalry. After attending, he enlisted in the 12th Hussars Regiment Akhtyrsky (1876). According to the General Staff service record, he later became a senior of the al-T Staff 2nd Caucasus Cossack division. In May 1884, he became the new commander of the Persian Cossack Brigade. He also served in the Russo-Turkish War (1877–78) and the Russo-Japanese War.

In 1908, he retired to his estate, Pogostiha, in Novgorod Governorate. Kossogovsky was shot by the Bolsheviks there on 12 September 1918.

== Name ==
His surname can be written as Kosogovsky, Kosagovsky, Kosagovsky, Kosogovsky.

== Selected bibliography ==
Published works;

- From the diary as a Colonel Tehran VA Kosogovskogo. Moscow, 1960 (fragments)
- Persia in the late XIX century // New East. 1923. № 3 (fragment)
- Essay on the development of the Persian Cossack Brigade // New East. 1923. № 4

Unpublished works;

- The armed forces of Persia // RGVIA, f. 76, op. 1, d. 378 (503 pp.)
- History of the Persian Cossack Brigade // RGVIA, f. 76, op. 1, d. 217 (315 pp.)
- Articles about Persia // RGVIA, f. 76, op. 1, d. 371 (130 pp.)
- Memories // RGVIA, f. 76, op. 1, d. 591 (128 pp.)
- Blog // Archive of orientalists of the Institute of Oriental Manuscripts, p. 30 VA Kosagovsky

== Sources ==
- Послужной список генерал-майора Косаговского В. А., РГВИА, ф. 409, оп. 1, д. 317-686 (1906 г.) (in Russian)
- Личный фонд Косаговского В. А. РГВИА, ф. 76, 591 ед. хр., 1820—1921 гг., оп. 1. (in Russian)
- Личный фонд Косаговского В. А. Архив востоковедов ИВР РАН, ф. 30. (in Russian)
- Список генералам по старшинству на 1903 год. СПб., 1903. (in Russian)
- Шитов Г. В. Персия под властью последних Каджаров. Л., 1933. (in Russian)
- Петров Г. М. Из архива Косаговского [Сведения об убийстве в Тегеране Российского Императорского чрезвычайного посланника и полномочного министра при дворе персидском Грибоедова]. — Ученые записки Института востоковедения. Т. VIII. М., изд. АН СССР, 1953, с. 156—162. (in Russian)
- Петров Г. М. Предисловие // Из тегеранского дневника полковника В. А. Косоговского. М., 1960. (in Russian)
- Басханов М. К. Русские военные востоковеды до 1917 года. Биобиблиографический словарь. М., Восточная литература, 2005, с. 126—127.
- Красняк О. А. Становление иранской регулярной армии в 1879—1921 гг. М., 2007. (in Russian)
