= 1st Caucasus Cossack Division =

- 1-я Кавказская казачья дивизия
- Active: 1878–1918
- Country: Russian Empire
- Branch: Imperial Russian Army
- Type: Cavalry

The 1st Caucasus Cossack Division was a cavalry unit within the Imperial Russian Army. They were headquartered at Kars.

== Commanders ==
- 1879: S. A. Sheremetev
- 1898–1899: Alexei Domontovich
- 1912–1915: Nikolai Baratov
- 1916–1918: Ernest-Avgust Ferd. Raddatz

== Chiefs of Staff ==
- 1879–1880: Yakov Dmitriyevich Malama
- 1896: A. A. Zegelov
- 1901–1902: Fyodor Chernozubov

== Commanders of the 1st Brigade ==
- 1893–1894: Alexei Domontovich

== Commanders of the 2nd Brigade ==
- 1878–1879: Kelbali Khan Nakhchivanski
- 1907–1912: Dmitry Abatsiyev
