= Alexei Rodionov (general) =

Russian Cossack general (1853–1919)

Alexei Viktorovich Rodionov
- Born: July 14, 1853
- Died: September 4, 1919 (aged 66) Novocherkassk
- Allegiance: Russian Empire
- Branch: Imperial Russian Army
- Service years: 1871–1917
- Rank: General of Cavalry
- Commands: 2nd Combined Cossack Division (Russian Empire)
- Conflicts: Russo-Turkish War
- Awards: Order of Saint Vladimir, 2nd Class Order of Saint Anna, 1st Class Order of Saint Stanislaus, 1st Class Officer's Cross of the Legion of Honour (France)
- Spouse: Baroness Emilia Borisovna Heiningen-Güne

Alexei Viktorovich Rodionov (July 14, 1853 – September 4, 1919) was a participant in the Russo-Turkish War (1877-78), commander of the Life Guards of the Cossack Regiment, head of the 2nd Combined Cossack Division (Russian Empire), honorary guardian, and cavalry general.

== Biography ==
Rodionov was born on July 14, 1853, came from noblemen of the Don Army Region and was the son of Lieutenant General Viktor Alekseevich Rodionov (1821–1906). He entered the service on September 1, 1871. At the end of the Page Corps, he was released from the pages by a cornet in the Life Guards Cossack Regiment (August 10, 1873). Having received the rank of lieutenant on April 13, 1875, Rodionov took part in the Russian-Turkish war of 1877–1878 and for the difference was awarded the Order of St. Anna of the 3rd degree with swords and a bow and St. Vladimir of the 4th degree with swords and a bow. Continuing service at the regiment at the end of the war, he was promoted to staff captains (January 6, 1879), captains (March 24, 1885) and colonels (February 28, 1893), holding the posts of squadron commander of His Majesty (from November 4, 1885 to October 1, 1891) and assistant commander of the Life Guards Cossack Regiment (from April 21, 1893 to June 9, 1899).

From June 25, 1899, Rodionov commanded the 8th Don Cossack Regiment. On December 11, 1902, he was promoted to major general with the appointment of general for special assignments under the military ataman of the Donskoy Army. On June 30, 1904, he became commander of the Life Guards of the Cossack Regiment and the following year he was enrolled in the retinue of His Imperial Majesty.

From February 10, 1907 to September 14, 1911, Rodionov commanded the 3rd brigade of the 1st Guards Cavalry Division (Russian Empire), and on September 14, 1911, he was promoted to lieutenant general and appointed head of the 2nd Combined Cossack Division (Russian Empire). On December 31, 1913, he was dismissed from the age qualification service with the award of the rank of general from the cavalry, with a uniform and pension. Rodionov stayed in retirement for a little more than two months and on March 6, 1914, he was again accepted by the former rank of lieutenant general (with seniority from November 19, 1911), with enrollment in the Guards Cavalry and the Donskoy Army and in the lists of the Life Guards of the Cossack Regiment and appointment as honorary guardian of St. Petersburg (after the outbreak of World War I - Petrograd) the presence of the Board of Trustees of the institutions of the Empress Maria. As an honorary guardian, he was a member of the council on the economic part of the Imperial Educational Society of Noble Maidens (Smolny Institute) and the Alexander Institute.

After the February Revolution of 1917, the Provisional Government set about liquidating the Departments of Institutions of Empress Mary, and Rodionov, like other honorary guardians, was left to the state. Shortly before the October Revolution, Rodionov was dismissed from the petition service with the production of generals from the cavalry, with his uniform and pension (October 3, 1917), thus receiving the rank of full general for the second time. During the Civil War, the general from the cavalry Rodionov left for the south of Russia and joined the Don army. On September 4, 1919, at the age of 66, he died of an illness in Novocherkassk.

Rodionov was married to Baroness Emilia Borisovna von Hoyningen-Huene, a member of a Baltic German noble family.

== Awards ==
Rodionov was awarded many orders for his service, including:

- Order of Saint Stanislaus (House of Romanov), 3rd degree (1876)
- Order of St. Anna, 3rd degree with swords and bow (1877)
- Order of St. Vladimir, 4th degree with swords and bow (1878)
- Order of St. Stanislav 2nd degree (1881)
- Order of St. Anna, 2nd degree (1884)
- Order of St. Vladimir, 3rd degree (1897)
- Order of St. Stanislav 1st degree (1905)
- Order of St. Anna, 1st steppe (1909)
- Order of St. Vladimir, 2nd degree (December 6, 1913)

=== Foreign orders ===
- Order of the Star of Romania, 5th degree (1877)
- Romanian Iron Cross (1879)
- Persian Order of Leo and Sun 3rd degree (1889)
- French Legion of Honor Officer Cross (1894)
- Abyssinian Order of the Ethiopian Star, 2nd degree (1901)

Military offices
Preceded by	Commander of the 2nd Combined Cossack Division; 1911-1913	Succeeded by

== Sources ==
- Volkov S.V., Generals of the Russian Empire. Encyclopedic dictionary of generals and admirals from Peter I to Nicholas II. T. 2. L - Ya. - M., 2009 .-- S. 407–408. - ISBN 978-5-9524-4167-5
- Tales for 184 (1711-1895). Biographies of former pages with portraits / Collected and published by O.R. von Freiman. Vol. 8. - Friedrichshamn, 1896 .-- S. 663.
- List to seniority generals. Done on July 1, 1906. - SPb., 1906. - S. 889.
- List to seniority generals. Done on April 15, 1914. - SPb., 1914 .-- S. 324.
- All Petrograd for 1916. - PG., 1916.
