= Persian Cossack Brigade =

Elite cavalry unit in Qajar Iran (1879–1921)

Cossack Brigade
- Persian: تیپ قزاق
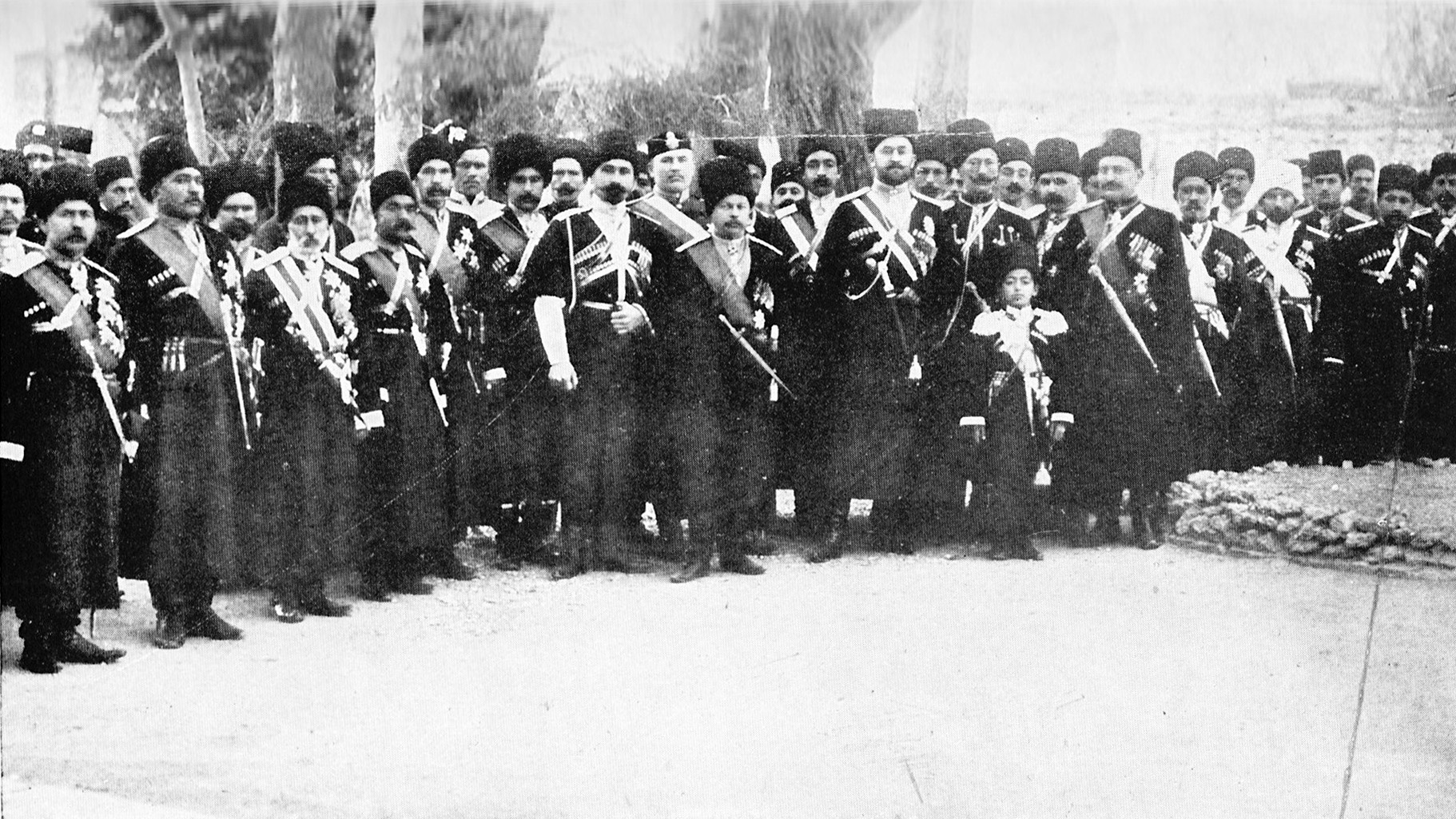
- Persian Cossack Brigade in Tabriz in 1909
- Active: 1879–1921
- Disbanded: 6 December 1921
- Country: Qajar Iran
- Allegiance: Russian Empire (1879–1917); White movement (1917–1920); British Empire (1921)
- Branch: Persian Army
- Type: Cavalry
- Role: Special operations
- Garrison/HQ: Tehran, Tabriz, Isfahan, Mashhad, Ardabil, Hamadan, Urmia, Mazandaran and Gilan
- Engagements: Persian Constitutional Revolution; 1908 bombardment of the Majlis; World War I; Persian campaign; Mohammad Khiabani's uprising; 1921 Persian coup d'état; Suppression of Pessian's revolt; Campaign on the Jungle Movement

Commanders
- Notable commanders: Col. Vladimir Liakhov; Brigadier General (and future Shah) Reza Khan; Brigadier general Martiros Khan Davidkhanian; Brigadier general Alexander Khan Setkhanian

The Persian Cossack Brigade, also known as the Iranian Cossack Brigade (Persian: بریگاد قزاق, romanized: Berīgād-e qazzāq), was a Cossack-style cavalry unit formed in 1879 in Iran. It was modelled after the Caucasian Cossack regiments of the Imperial Russian Army. Until 1920, it was commanded by Russian officers, while its rank and file were composed of ethnic Caucasians and later on Iranians as well. During much of the brigade's history it was the most functional and effective military unit of the Qajar dynasty. Acting on occasion as kingmakers, this force played a pivotal role in modern Iranian history during the Persian Constitutional Revolution, the rise of Reza Shah, and the foundation of the Pahlavi dynasty.

== Origin, purpose and makeup ==
The Cossack Brigade was formed by Naser al-Din Shah in 1879, using as a model the Caucasian Cossack regiments of the Imperial Russian Army which had impressed him when travelling through southern Russia in 1878. During his trip to Europe in 1878–1879, the Shah had stayed in Yerevan, where a party of Cossacks had escorted him and the rest of the Iranian court across Russian Armenia. Naser al-Din expressed much admiration for the colorful uniforms of the Cossacks along with their skilled horsemanship and their talents with their guns and shashkas (the type of sword favored by the Cossacks). In Tiflis (Capital of Russian Caucasus Viceroyalty), Naser al-Din asked the Governor-General Grand Duke Mikhail for Russian assistance in settling up a Cossack unit in Iran. In turn, the Duke passed along the request to Emperor Alexander II in St. Petersburg, where it was approved. Together with a Swedish-trained and officered gendarmerie, the Cossack Brigade came to comprise the most effective military force available to the Iranian crown in the years prior to World War I.

In spite of its name the brigade was not a typical Cossack force as employed in the neighbouring Russian Empire. The Cossack regiments of the Imperial Russian Army were based on a feudal-style system under which military service was given in return for long-term grants of land. By contrast the Persian Cossack Brigade was recruited on a conventional basis, from a mix of volunteers and conscripts. Neither did it have the status of a guards unit. However, it closely resembled a true Cossack-style cavalry unit. Late 19th century photographs (see example below) show Russian style uniforms, in contrast to the indigenous dress of other Iranian forces at the time.

Russian attitudes towards Iran in the 19th century were a mixture of patronising contempt for an "Oriental" country along with a genuine respect for Qajar Shahs as fellow monarchs who were the rightful rulers of Iran. In spite of the religious divide between Orthodox Russia and Muslim Iran, there was a sense of monarchial solidarity held by elites in both nations that regarded all monarchs regardless of their religion to be entitled to respect and obedience from their subjects. Though Russian-Iranian relations in the 19th century not very harmonious, the Qajar Shahs (most notably Naser al-Din, who ruled as an absolute monarch) had an instinctive preference for Russia, whose autocratic political system was close to their own. The so-called "Great Game" as competition for influence in Asia between the British and Russian empires had the effect of preserving Iranian independence at a time when Iran was becoming dangerously close to becoming to use a modern term a "failed state". Neither the British nor the Russians would tolerate Iran being annexed to the other rival empire, so both powers acted to preserve Iran as a state. There was a gradual breakdown in the authority of the Iranian state during the later Qajar era as corruption was so rampant to the point of pushing Iran to the brink of bankruptcy. Corruption was epidemic during the reign of Naser al-Din. The Shah held semi-annual auctions where all the offices of the Iranian state were sold to the highest bidder and in turn were allowed to plunder whatever office they had purchased. Only loans from Russia and Britain prevented Iran from actually going bankrupt, and in return both Britain and Russia received special rights in Iran. Naser al-Din's brother famously compared Iran to "a lump of sugar in a glass of water" that was slowly melting away as corruption hallowed out the Qajar state. Based on the way that the Iranian state was dissolving in the later Qajar era to the rampant corruption, Iran would have almost certainly been annexed to either to the British or the Russian empires, and only the fact that neither empire considered it acceptable to see Iran annexed to the other rival empire prevented Iran from being annexed. Russian policy in Iran was to preserve Iran, but at the same time to keep Iran so weak that it would never be capable of challenging Russia.

The rank and file of the brigade were always Caucasian Muhajir and later Iranians as well, but until 1920 its commanders were Russian officers who were also employed in the Russian army, such as Vladimir Liakhov. Such secondments were encouraged by the Imperial Russian Government who saw the Cossack Brigade as a means of extending Russian influence in a key area of international rivalry. After the October Revolution in 1917, many of these Russian officers left the country to join the "White" forces. The command of the Persian Cossack Division was subsequently transferred to Iranian officers. Most notable among these officers was General Reza Khan, who started his military career as a private soldier in the Cossack Brigade and rose through its ranks to become a Brigadier General.

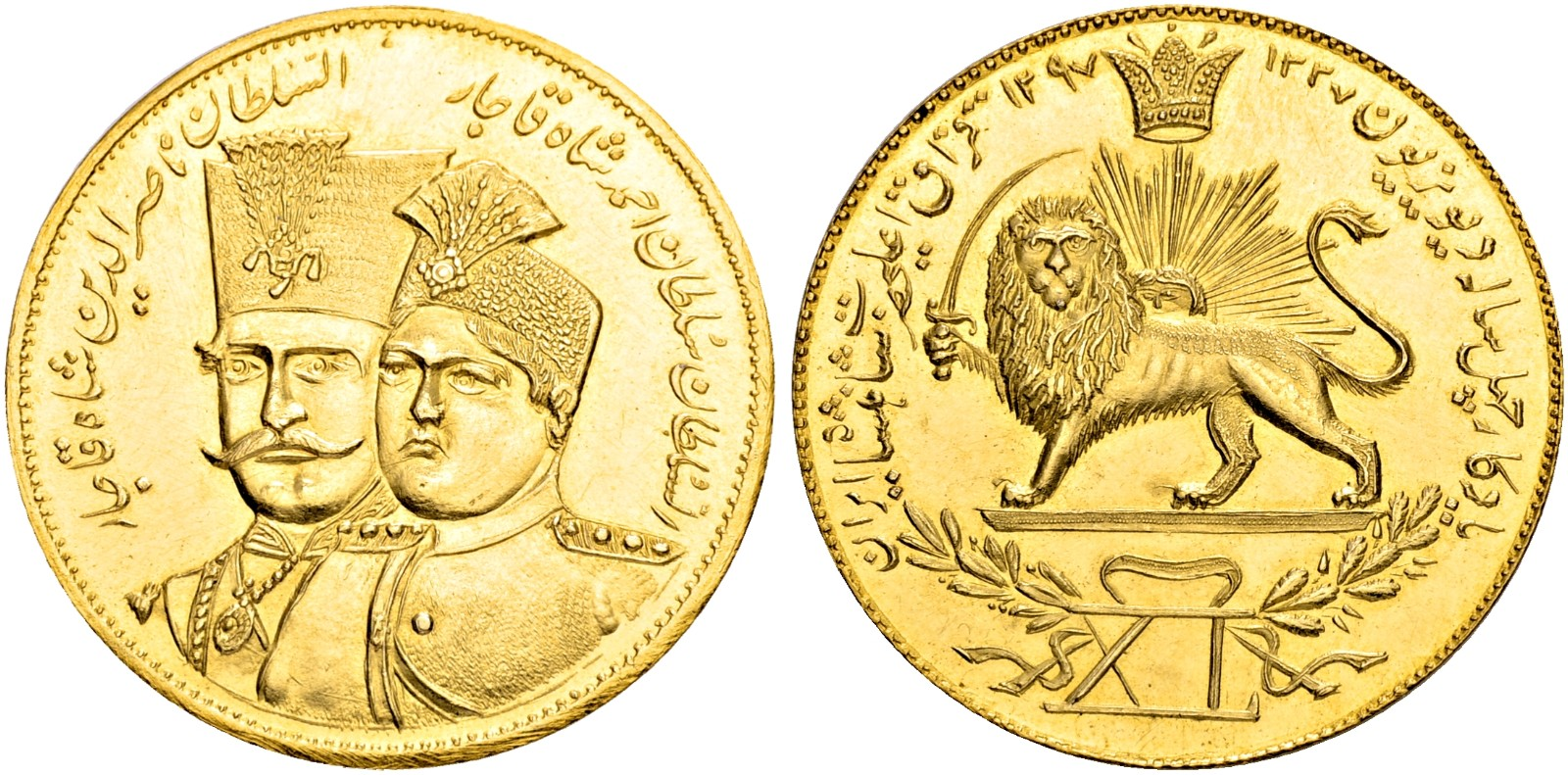
Commemorative gold medal for 40th anniversary of Cossack Brigade foundation; 1919

== Detailed history ==
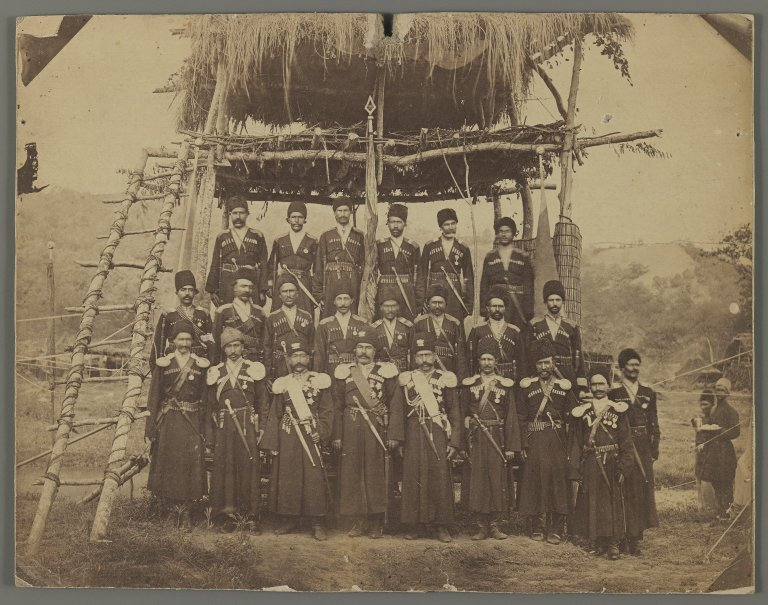
Persian Cossacks, One of 274 Vintage Photographs. Brooklyn Museum.

At the time of the Persian Cossack Brigade's formation the Shah's royal cavalry was described as having no training or discipline. The Qajar state at this point was very weak, lacking any professional military force. In wars against the British, the royal cavalry had been defeated; and had even had much difficulty fighting against Turcoman nomads. Tsar Alexander II approved Russian military advisors traveling to Iran to fulfill the Shah's request for assistance. The brigade was then formed in 1879 by Lieutenant-Colonel Aleksey Domantovich, a Russian officer.

=== Early development of the Cossack Brigade ===
Russian interests and lack of funding slowed the initial development of the brigade into a professional fighting force. The initial strength of the brigade was 400 men drawn from immigrants known as Caucasian muhajirs, who were descendants of Circassians and Transcaucasian Muslims who had migrated to Iran to avoid Russian rule. They possessed special privileges as a hereditary military caste. Domantovich made rapid progress with their training and the Shah ordered the strength of the new brigade to be increased to 600 men drawn from the regular army. The rapid progress of the Cossack Brigade caused concern in Russia due to the fear that it might become a true fighting force rather than a tool of the Russian government. Domantovich complained that the Imperial Iranian Army had no quartermasters, which forced him to buy supplies and uniforms from Tehran merchants for the Cossack Brigade out of his own salary. The fact that Domantovich served as the brigade's quartermaster as he purchased all supplies allowed him to dominate the brigade, but it seemed that this situation came about more of necessity as the Shah was too cheap to establish a quartermaster corps in his army as opposed to a plan to establish Russian influence. Domantovich was an honest officer who dismissed several of his Persian officers for "taking liberties" with the brigade's finances as he phrased it, which greatly contributed to the professionalism of the brigade, which was the only unit in the Iranian Army that was paid on time and in full. The Iranian historian Kaveh Farrokh wrote about the Cossack brigade: "Domanovich introduced a number of positive practices including strict discipline, prompt pay, and promotion through military merit rather than family/political connections".

Domantovich was dismissed as commander in 1881 and replaced by the less effective Colonel Charkovsij, over the protests of the Shah. Domantovich had come into conflict with the Russian minister-plenipotentiary in Tehran, I.A. Zinoviev, who saw him as a rival as Domantovich reported directly to Naser al-Din. In his reports to St. Petersburg, Zinoviev accused Domantovich of damaging Russia's interests in Iran by ironically establishing an effective military unit which might one day be used against Russia. Zinoviev argued that the Cossack Brigade should be used as a tool for extending Russian influence in Iran, but not to the point of giving the Shah militarily effective unit.

Charkovsij added four artillery pieces to the arsenal of the brigade in 1883 but made no other improvements. A major problem with the Iranian Army in the Qajar era was that officers' commissions were sold by the Shah, which ensured that it was the most wealthy and not necessarily the most competent served as officers. As the prestige of the Cossack Brigade rose, it became the most desirable unit to serve in and hence the most profitable for the Shah to sell commissions in. In 1886 Colonel Karavaev became commander. During his time, the brigade was faced with budget cuts and thus had its numbers diminished. In 1890 Colonel Shneur took over and was unable to pay the men. After many desertions, combined with a cholera epidemic, the strength was reduced to 450 men, and eventually cut down to 200. Shneur left in 1893, leaving command to a junior officer. By this time the brigade was rapidly disintegrating and the Shah was under pressure to disband it and give control over army training to German military advisors. It was further cut to just 150 men with one Russian officer. At this point it seemed that the brigade would end as a failed experiment and become nothing more than a footnote in Iranian history.

=== Turning point ===
The Persian Cossack Brigade was saved by the arrival of Colonel Kosagoskij who was to become the most effective commanding officer in its history. The immediate problem that he faced was the Muhajir aristocracy in the brigade, who considered themselves as an entitled elite. This privileged group often refused to work and reacted poorly to attempts at discipline. The Muhajir faction mutinied in 1895, dividing the brigade and seizing a large portion of its funds, encouraged by the Shah's son who was Minister of War. Under pressure from Russia the Cossack Brigade was reunified under Kosagoskij's command and the muhajirs were treated like other regular soldiers. The result was a great improvement in efficiency, resulting in a well-organized, well-trained, and obedient force.

=== Assassination of Naser-ed-Din Shah ===
The first major event involving the brigade arose from the assassination of their founder, Naser-ed-Din Shah on May 1, 1896. Chaos broke loose as different factions sought to take power, and mobs rampaged in the streets. The police were unable to control them and the regular army could not be relied upon to do so. Kosagovskij was given free rein by the Prime Minister Amin os-Soltan to "Act in accordance with your own understanding and wisdom." Kosagovskij quickly mobilized the brigade and had them occupy the whole of Tehran to keep order in the city. The brigade also became involved in intrigues between different factions of the Iranian government. Nayeb os-Saltenah, the local commander of the forces in Tehran was likely to seize power from the legitimate heir, Mozaffar ad-Din Shah, who was in Tabriz. Kosagovski, backed by the brigade, the Russians and British, warned Saltenah that only Mozaffar ad-Din Shah would be recognized as the legitimate heir. On June 7, 1896, Mozaffar ad-Din Shah entered Tehran escorted by the Cossacks. The brigade on this date established themselves as kingmakers and in the future would serve as important tools for both the Russians and the Shah in maintaining control of Iran. Russian influence inside Iran expanded tremendously as the brigade was able to exert massive control in internal Iranian politics and intrigues.

As the brigade was numerically enlarging and drastically growing in military strength, eventually civilian volunteers were also accepted into its ranks, including members of ethnic and religious minorities. For example, from the mid-1890s until 1903, the highest-ranking Iranian officer in the brigade was the chief of staff, Martiros Khan Davidkhanian, an Armenian from New Julfa, near Isfahan, who had been educated at the Lazarevskiĭ Institute, a secondary school for Armenians founded in Moscow by an Armenian merchant.

By 1903 the brigade was reported to have grown to 1,500 men, with 200 Russian officers. This proportion of officers to other ranks was far higher than the one to thirty ratio that was usual in armies of that period and was regarded with concern by contemporary British commentators, who noted that the brigade was effectively under the direct control of the Imperial Russian Legation in Tehran. The brigade itself now included cavalry, infantry and artillery elements. It was independent of the regular Iranian Army and under the command of a colonel of the Russian General Staff with the local rank of Field Marshal. The Iranian rank and file were paid regularly on a monthly basis, at a cost amounting to 40,000 roubles.

=== Role during the Revolution of 1905–1911 ===
The second major event the Cossack Brigade played a role in was the 1906 Constitutional Revolution, as a result of intense political pressure and rebellion. Mozaffar ad-Din Shah gave in to the rebels, and died shortly after signing the Constitution. It was the Persian Cossack Brigade that helped keeping his son Muhammad Ali Shah on the throne. As a consequence however, he was considered to be a Russian puppet. He later attempted to overthrow the government established by the Constitution using the Persian Cossack Brigade in January 1907. It surrounded the Majles (parliament) and shelled the building with heavy artillery. He was briefly successful and with the help of Colonel Liakhov, the brigade commander, he governed Tehran for a year acting as a military dictator. Liakhov was appointed military governor of Tehran. In the ensuing civil strife forces from Azerbaijan led by Sattar Khan and Yeprem Khan retook Tehran from the Cossack Brigade, it forced the Shah to abdicate. Here the brigade failed in ensuring the power of the Shah. Nonetheless, the brigade retained a great deal of importance as a tool for both the Russians and the Shah. Furthermore, Russian influence greatly expanded during this time period with Russian forces occupying several parts of Iran (mostly the north), and the country became divided into spheres of influence between the Russians and the British as agreed in the Anglo-Russian Agreement signed in August 1907.

=== Role in World War I ===
World War I spilled over into Iranian territory as Ottoman, Russian, and British forces entered Iran. The Russian Command in 1916 expanded the Cossack Brigade to full divisional strength of roughly 8,000 men. The brigade engaged in combat against Ottoman troops and helped to secure Russian interests in northern Iran. The British-created South Persia Rifles performed the same function in southern Iran for the British.

In 1917, the new revolutionary government led by Vladimir Lenin had renounced all of the special rights held by Russia in Iran and ordered the withdrawal of the Russian officers from the Cossack Brigade. Following the Russian Revolution of 1917, the British took over the Cossack Brigade and removed Russian officers, replacing them with British and Iranian ones. Besides for replacing the officers, Britain paid the wages of the Cossack Brigade from December 1917 onward. The majority of the 50, 000 Russian troops in Iran started to leave that December and through the Cossack officers were almost uniformly White rather than Red in their politics, almost all of them wanted to return to Russia to fight against the Bolsheviks. This was an important transition point in the history of the brigade as it now came under complete British and Iranian control and was effectively purged of Russian influence. Following the war, Iran found itself devastated and divided as various regions of the country had broken away. In the 1920s, to re-exert central control, the Shah deployed the Cossack Brigade to crush the Azadistan movement in Tabriz. It was successful here but less effective in putting down another rebellion movement in the North, called the Jangali movement.

=== Role in the rise of Reza Shah ===
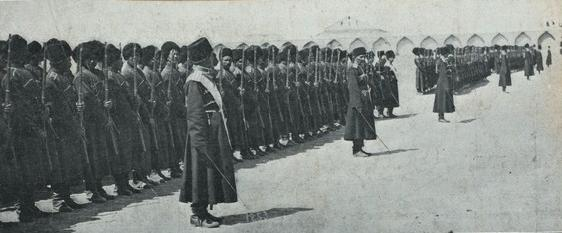
The Persian Cossack Brigade c. 1920

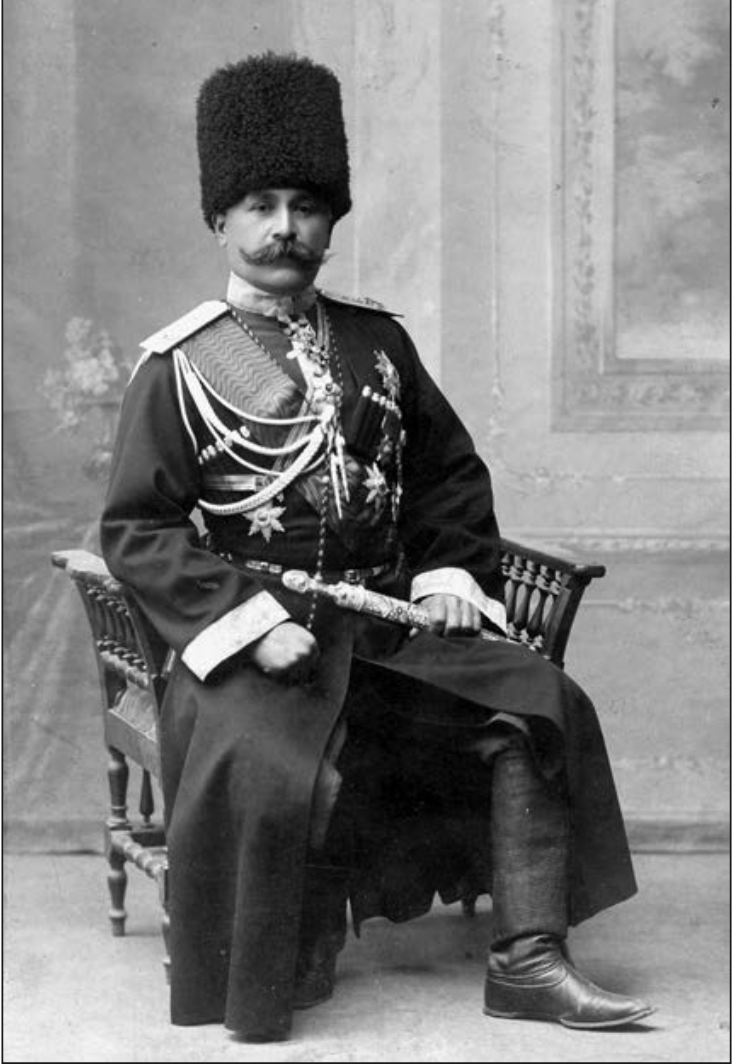
Portrait of Alexander Khan Setkhanian, 1908

By 1919, Iran had finally descended into a "failed state" with the provinces ruled by warlords whom the shah in Tehran had no control over. With Iran in chaos and facing fragmentation there was a political vacuum in Tehran, which had no functioning government. It is in this context of fragmentation and disorder that Reza Khan, an officer from the Cossack Brigade, rose to power as Iran's "man on horseback" who would save the country from chaos. At same time, there was an ideological face-off between the new Bolshevik government in Russia vs. the British empire. Much like the leaders of the French Revolution, Lenin saw it as his mission to spread his revolution around the world. The Bolsheviks were supporting a Persian Socialist Soviet Republic in northern Iran as a way to promote revolution in the Middle East, which led to fears in London that Soviet Russia would export its revolution into Iran. The British had first considered the idea of partitioning Iran with the oil-rich province of Khuzestan to be turned into a protectorate, but then decided it would be better to have a "strongman" leader in Tehran who would place all of Iran in the British sphere of influence to counter Soviet Russia. The Anglo-Persian Oil Company (now British Petroleum) owned the oil concessions in Khuzestan, and from the British viewpoint it was considered essential for reasons of national security to have a source of oil that was under British ownership. In 1912, the First Lord of the Admiralty, Winston Churchill, had decided to convert the warships of the Royal Navy from coal to oil, and in 1914 arranged to have the Crown buy the shares of the Anglo-Persian Oil Company as a way to ensure that Britain would always own a major oil concession. Churchill's decision to buy the shares of Anglo-Persian Oil Company was largely taken for political reasons, namely to defend himself from the accusation that he was weakening British national security by converting the Royal Navy's warships from coal to oil at a time when there were no major oil concessions entirely under British reason. The Royal Dutch Shell Oil Company-which owned extensive oil concessions in Russia, the West Indies, Venezuela, and Mexico-was only partly British owned with the other shareholders being Dutch. Once the decision had been taken to buy Anglo-Persian, the British government found itself committed to defending the oil concession in Khuzestan from any possible threat.

Reza Khan had joined the brigade when he was sixteen years old and became the first Persian to be appointed as Brigadier-General of the brigade. Like most Iranians at the time, Reza Khan had no surname and only adopted the surname Pahlavi in 1925 when he became Shah. He had risen rapidly through the ranks of the brigade following the British purge though he had learned much from the previous Russian officers. On 14 January 1921, the British General Ironside chose to promote Reza Khan, who had been leading the Tabriz battalion, to lead the entire brigade. After General Ironside promoted Reza Khan, members of the brigade approached Alexander Khan Setkhanian, the Chief of Staff of the brigade, to consider opposing Reza's rise. As Setkhanian had been fond of Reza when Reza had served under his command, Setkhanian chose not to oppose the takeover. About a month later, under British direction, Reza Khan led his 3,000–4,000 strong detachment of the Cossack Brigade based in Qazvin and Hamadan to Tehran in 1921 and seized the capital. With this coup Reza Khan established himself as the most powerful person in Iran. Although the coup was largely bloodless and faced little resistance, Setkhanian remained one of the last generals to pledge his loyalty to the new Shah. Seeking his assent, Reza visited Setkhanian at the Davidkhanian mansion on Sepah Street. While circumnavigating the pond, Setkhanian pledged his loyalty, and subsequently sat for a portrait in full regalia for the new regime.

Reza Khan's later modernization and enlargement of the army would use the Cossack Brigade as its core. Prior to World War I the Cossack Brigade constituted, together with the Swedish-trained gendarmerie, the only truly professional military forces in Iran. With his expanded forces and the Cossack Brigade, Reza Khan launched military actions to eliminate separatist and dissident movements in Tabriz, Mashhad, and the Jangalis in Gilan, Simko and the Kurds. The brigade, with a strength of 7,000–8,000 men at the time, was merged with the gendarmerie and other forces to form the new Iranian Army of 40,000 which would be led by Iranian officers, many of them friends and cronies of Reza Khan from his days as an officer in the Cossack Brigade. These officers from the Cossack brigade received appointments and patronage in key positions in the new government and military. Using the Cossack Brigade as a springboard, Reza Khan found himself able to place himself in a position of power, centralizing the country, removing the Shah and crowning himself as new Shah, thus establishing the Pahlavi dynasty. He was then called Reza Shah.

The histography of the Cossack Brigade has been colored by ideological considerations. During the early years of the Bolshevik regime in Russia, virtually everything that existed in Russia prior to the October Revolution of 1917 was painted in the blackest of colors and the Cossack Brigade was portrayed by Soviet historians as simply a murderous tool of Russian imperialism in Iran, a line that Soviet historians maintained until 1945. Besides for Lenin's opposition to Russian imperialism in Iran, Cossacks tended to fare very badly in Soviet historiography. In The Russian Civil War, the Cossacks fought on the White side and later on in the Second World War a number of Cossacks collaborated with Nazi Germany. Because of their roles in the Russian Civil War and the Second World War, Cossacks were invariably portrayed in a hostile light by Soviet historians as traitors and war criminals. The Israeli historians Uzi Rabi and Nugzar Ter-Oganov wrote that this focus in Soviet historiography on vilifying the Persian Cossack Brigade led to a neglect of a number of historical questions such as how the brigade actually functioned, who served in the brigade and why.

After the Second World War, the Soviet Union initially refused to leave its occupation zone in Iran and sponsored a separatist government in Iranian Azerbaijan and Iranian Kurdistan. When Western historians started to portray Soviet foreign policy in Iran as merely a continuation of Imperial Russia's foreign policy in Iran, the Cossack Brigade was promptly "forgotten" by Soviet historians and was never mentioned again. In Iran during both the Pahlavi era and in the Islamic Republic, Qajar Iran was portrayed in a very unfavorable light. The fact that Reza Khan, the founder of the Pahlavi dynasty, had been able to become Shah because he started his career in a Russian-trained unit was regarded with some embarrassment by historians in Pahlavi era Iran. In present-day Islamic Republic of Iran, the Cossack Brigade is portrayed as another example of the "stupidity" of Naser al-Din who allowed Russia to exercise influence in Iran via the Cossack brigade as well providing the power base for Reza Khan to seize power in 1921.

== Commanders ==
| Commander | Period |
|---|---|
| (Russian Empire) Lieutenant-Colonel Aleksey Domantovich | April 1879 – 1882 |
| (Russian Empire) Colonel Pyotr Charkovsky | 1883–1885 |
| (Russian Empire) Colonel Aleksandr Kuzmin-Karavayev | 1885–1891 |
| (Russian Empire) Colonel Aleksandr Shnyeur | 1891–1894 |
| (Russian Empire) Colonel Vladimir Kossogovsky | May 1894 – 1903 |
| (Russian Empire) Colonel Fyodor Chernozoubov | 1903–1906 |
| (Russian Empire) Colonel Vladimir Liakhov | 1906 – November 1909 |
| (Russian Empire) Colonel Nikolay Vadbolsky | Nov 1909 – 1914 |
| (Russian Empire) Colonel Nikolay Prozorkievitch | 1914 – August 1915 |
| (Russian Empire) General Vladimir von Maydell | August 1915 – February 1917 |
| (Russian Empire) Colonel Georgy Klerzhe | February 1917 – early 1918 |
| (Russian Empire) Colonel Vsevolod Starosselsky | early 1918 – October 1920 |
| (Qajar Iran) Major-General Ghassem Khan Vali | 1920–1921 |
| (Qajar Iran) Brigadier-General Reza Khan | December 1921 |

== Notable senior officers ==
- General Martiros Khan Davidkhanian
- General Eskandar Khan Davidkhanian
- General Alexander Khan Setkhanian
- General Teymūr Khan Ayromlou
- General Mohammad-Hosayn Ayrom
- Amir Abdollah Tahmasebi
- Sar Karim Buzarjomehri
- Amanullah Jahanbani
- Mahmud Mir-Djalali
- Sepahbod Ahmad Amir-Ahmadi
- Hassan Alavikia
- Fazlollah Zahedi
- Colonel Assadollah Hosseinpoor

== Stations ==
Major

- Tabriz, Rasht, Mashhad, Tehran, Esfahan, Qazvin

Minor

- Hamedan, Bandar Anzali, Kermanshah

== Military ranks and non-military titles ==
- Commandant
- Second-in-Command
- Chief of Staff
- Intendant
- Atriyad Commander
- General (regimental commander)
- Major (battalion commander)
- Captain (company commander)
- Lieutenant
- Second Lieutenant
- Sergeant-major
- Platoon Sergeant
- Section Sergeant
- Corporal
- Drummer, Trumpeter, Cossack
- Medical Officer, Accountant, Assistant Accountant, Clerk, Armourer

== See also ==
- Cossacks
- Austro-Hungarian military mission in Persia
- Persian Gendarmerie
- Ethnic cleansing of Circassians
