= Mesopotamian campaign =

World War I military campaign

- Part of the Middle Eastern theatre of World War I
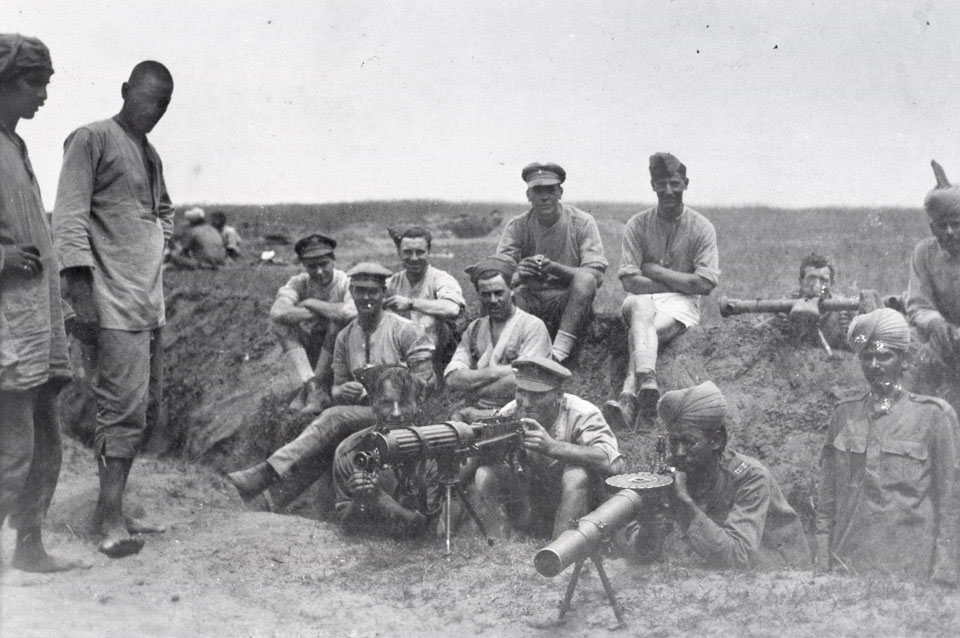
- British and Indian machine gunners, Mesopotamia, 1917.
Date	6 November 1914 – 14 November 1918 (4 years, 1 week and 1 day)
Location	Ottoman Iraq
Result	Allied victory
Territorial changes	Partitioning of the Ottoman Empire: End of the Al-Muntafiq Emirate

Belligerents
British Empire; India; Australia; New Zealand; Kuwait (1914); Russian Empire (1916) (Note: Battle of Khanaqin)	Ottoman Empire; Al-Muntafiq; Turcoman tribes; German Empire; Jam'iya al-Nahda al-Islamiya (1918) (Note: Note: Jamiya al-Nahda al-Islamiya was both anti-Ottoman and anti-British)

Commanders and leaders
(British Empire) John Nixon; (British Empire) Percy Lake; (British Empire) Stanley Maude #; (British Empire) Charles Townshend (POW); (British Empire) George Younghusband; Nikolai Baratov; (Kuwait) Mubarak Al-Sabah	(Ottoman Empire) Kâzım Karabekir; (German Empire) Colmar von der Goltz †; (Ottoman Empire) Nureddin Pasha; (Ottoman Empire) Halil Pasha; (Ottoman Empire) Jevad Pasha; (Ottoman Empire) Sulaiman al-Askeri ‡‡; (Ottoman Empire) Ali İhsan Pasha (POW); Ajmi al-Sa'dun (WIA)

Strength
889,702 (total): 447,531 (peak)	c. 450,000

Casualties and losses
~85,200 battle casualties: 11,008 killed; 5,281 died of wounds; 2,341 missing; 12,879 captured; 53,697 wounded; 16,712 died of disease 154,343 evacuated sick Total: 256,000 casualties	~89,500 battle casualties: 13,069 killed; 56,000 wounded or died of wounds; 22,404 captured; ~235,000 deserted, sick or died of disease; Total: 325,000 casualties

The Mesopotamian campaign or Mesopotamian front (Turkish: Irak Cephesi) was a campaign in the Middle Eastern theatre of World War I fought between the British Empire, with troops from Britain, Australia and the vast majority from the British Raj, and the Central Powers, primarily the Ottoman Empire, over control of Ottoman Iraq. It started after the British Fao Landing in 1914, which sought to protect Anglo-Persian Oil Company oil fields in Khuzestan province and the Shatt al-Arab waterway. The front later evolved into a larger campaign that sought to capture the city of Baghdad and divert Ottoman forces from other fronts. It ended with the Armistice of Mudros in 1918, leading to the cession of Iraq and further partition of the Ottoman Empire.

The British advanced from Al-Faw to the city of Basra to secure British oil fields in nearby Iran. Following the landings, British forces won a string of victories along the Tigris and Euphrates rivers, including the repulse of an Ottoman attempt to retake Basra at the Battle of Shaiba. The advance stalled when the British reached the town of Kut, south of the city of Baghdad in December 1915. The Siege of Kut led to the defeat of the British force, later called "the worst defeat of the Allies in World War I". The British re-organised and began a new campaign to take Baghdad. Despite fierce Ottoman resistance, Baghdad was captured in March 1917 and the Ottomans suffered more defeats until the Armistice at Mudros.

The campaign ended with a British mandate over Mesopotamia being established and a change of the balance of power following the Ottoman expulsion from the region. In Turkey, elements of the Misak-ı Millî, the last Ottoman parliament, still claimed parts of modern Iraq such as Mosul as being Turkish, leading to Allied occupation of Constantinople. The British mandate over Mesopotamia later failed as an Iraqi revolt in 1920, caused by discontent with the British administration, led to the Cairo Conference in 1921. It was decided a Hashemite kingdom under British influence would be established in the region with Faisal as its first monarch.

== Background ==
Prior to Ottoman entry into World War I, the British had gained exclusive rights to oil fields in south-western Persia (modern Iran), many in Arabistan, under the jurisdiction of the Anglo-Persian Oil Company. Persia had previously been divided by the British and Russian Empires into spheres of influence in 1907, with these oil fields under British influence. The oil pipeline to transport the Persian petroleum ran alongside the Karun River into the Shatt al-Arab waterway, with refineries based on Abadan Island in the area. Much of the Shatt al-Arab also flowed through Ottoman-owned Mesopotamia, making this pipeline vulnerable to invasion.

The petroleum in this region was vital for Britain's new oil-fired, turbine based dreadnoughts as well as toluol for the production of explosives. Britain wanted to retain its dominance of the Persian Gulf, show support for local Arabs, and demonstrate power to the Ottomans, with Sir Edmund Barrow, military secretary to the Indian Office, stating, "ostensibly to protect the oil installation but in reality to notify the Turks that we mean business and to the Arabs that we are ready to support them". Growing German influence in the region caused by the creation of the Berlin–Baghdad railway was of concern to London. As for the Turks, they were unable fully to control Iraq and constantly engaged in border disputes with neighbouring Persia. Local policy was largely decided by local Arab tribes.

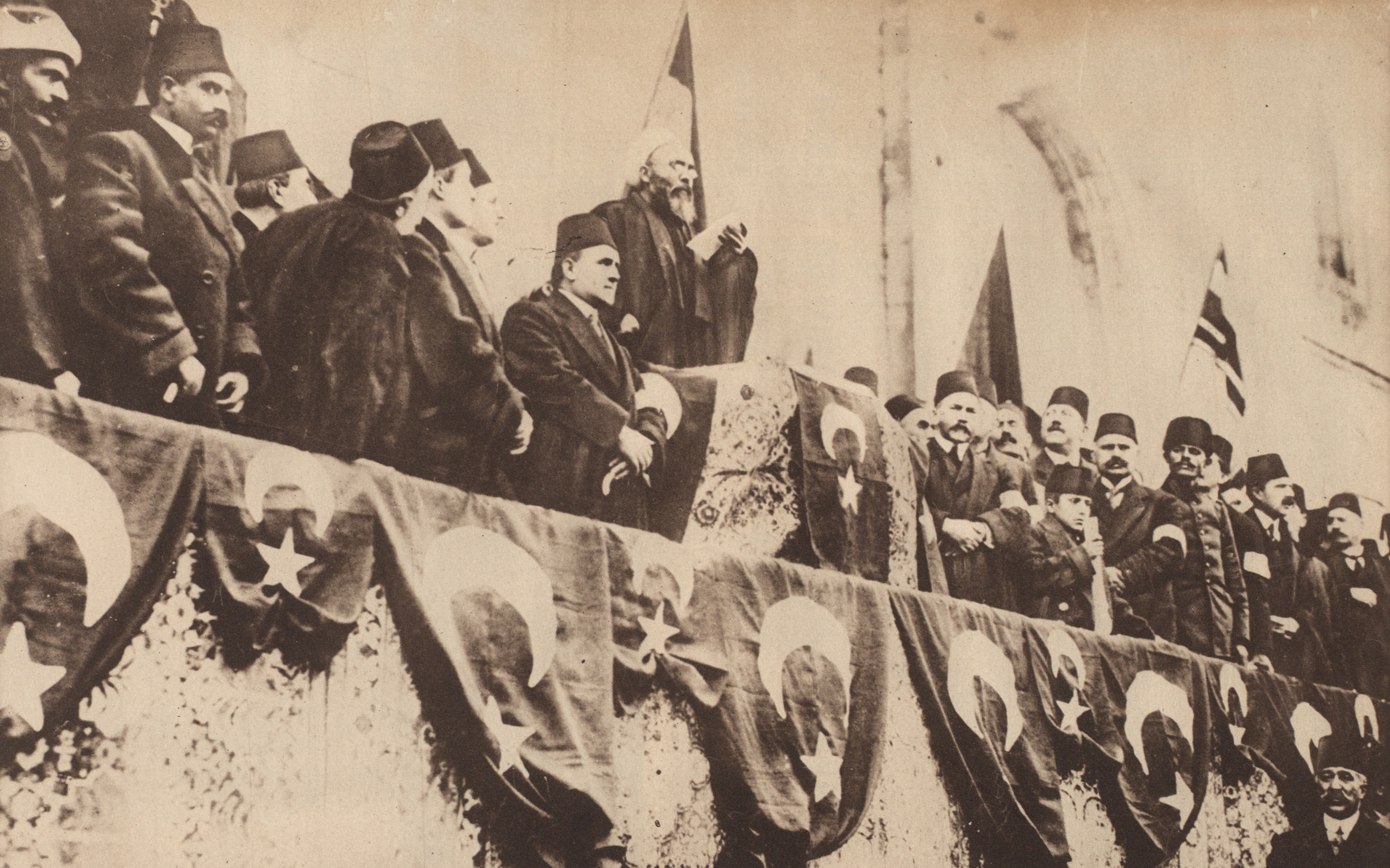
Fetva emini Ali Haydar Efendi declaring a jihad ("struggle") against enemies of Islam (the Allies).

Later on 14 November 1914, the Ottoman government declared a holy war, dubbed the jihad ("struggle"), against enemies of Islam with the exception of the Central Powers, which swayed some Ottoman Arabs to stay loyal to the empire and fight the Allied Powers. This notably included some Shia Muslims, a previously oppressed group within the empire. A 1912 agreement between the Indian and British military offices stated that in the event of war in the Persian Gulf or Mesopotamia, it would be the responsibility of the Indian military to mount a campaign in the region. However, the Gulf was not a priority to London as the Suez Canal and Western Front were seen as more important, whereas Delhi planned an offensive campaign to take Baghdad. On 29 October 1914, Ottoman warships commanded by the German admiral Wilhelm Souchon, bombarded several Russian Black Sea ports, prompting a Russian declaration of war on 2 November 1914, with Britain and France following suit on 5 November.

With the Ottoman Empire now at war with the principal allied powers, its priorities included the Caucasus Campaign against Russia, with the Ottoman war minister, Enver Pasha sending the 37th Division and XIII Corps Headquarters to this theatre in support of the Third Army. The entire XII Corps was deployed to the Sinai and Palestine Campaign. Fourth Army Headquarters was sent to Syria, to replace the Second Army Headquarters, which was sent to Istanbul. In place of the Fourth Army was the "Iraq Area Command" with only the 38th Division under its command. This division was led by Lt.Col. Süleyman Askeri Bey. British operational planning included landing troops in the Shatt-al-Arab and mount a largely defensive campaign. The reinforced 6th (Poona) Division of the British Indian Army was assigned the task, designated as Indian Expeditionary Force D (IEFD) and stationed in Bahrain in anticipation of invasion. The Allies originally planned to seize Persian-controlled Abadan Island, but fear of provoking a war with Persia led to planned landings at Fao instead.

== Operations ==
=== 1914 ===
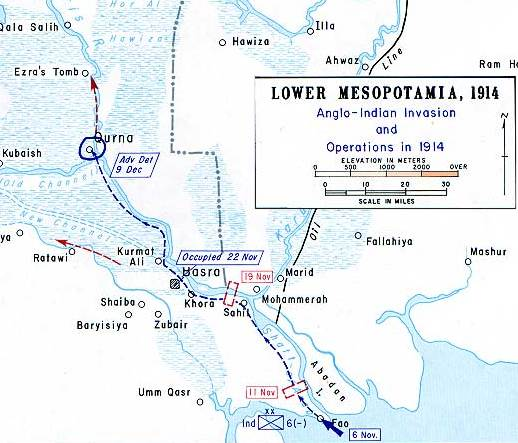
1914, Initial British offensive

On 6 November 1914, British offensive action began with the naval bombardment of the old fort at Fao, located at the point where the Shatt-al-Arab meets the Persian Gulf. At the Fao Landing, the British Indian Expeditionary Force D (IEF D), comprising the 6th (Poona) Division led by Lieutenant General Arthur Barrett with Sir Percy Cox as Political Officer, was opposed by 350 Ottoman troops and 4 guns. After a short engagement, the fort was overrun, killing many enemy troops. By mid-November the Poona Division was fully ashore and began moving towards the city of Basra.

The same month, the ruler of Kuwait, Sheikh Mubarak Al-Sabah, contributed to the Allied war effort by sending forces to attack Ottoman troops at Umm Qasr, Safwan, Bubiyan, and Basra. In exchange the British government recognised Kuwait as an "independent government under British protection." There is no report on the exact size and nature of Mubarak's attack, though Ottoman forces did retreat from those positions weeks later. Mubarak soon removed the Ottoman symbol from the Kuwaiti flag and replaced it with "Kuwait" written in Arabic script. Mubarak's participation and previous exploits in obstructing the completion of the Baghdad railway helped the British safeguard the Persian Gulf by preventing Ottoman and German reinforcement.

On 22 November, the British occupied the city of Basra after a short fight with soldiers of the Iraq Area Command under Suphi Bey, the Governor of Basra. The Ottoman troops abandoned Basra and retreated up the river. After establishing order in the town the English forces continued their advance, and at the Battle of Qurna they succeeded in capturing Subhi Bey and 1,000 troops. This put the British in a very strong position, ensuring that Basra and the oilfields would be protected from any Ottoman advance. The main Ottoman army, under the command of Khalil Pasha, was 275 mi (443 km) to the north-west around Baghdad that made only weak efforts to dislodge the British.

=== 1915 ===
Operations of 1915

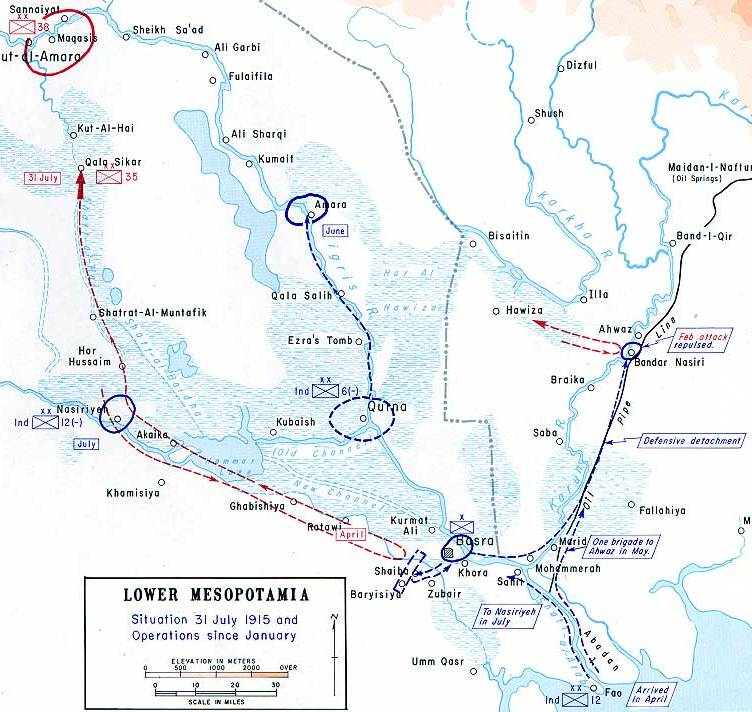
July, British offensive

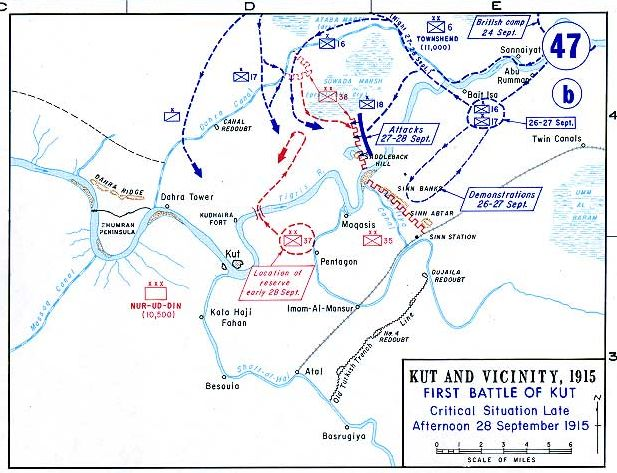
September, British offensive

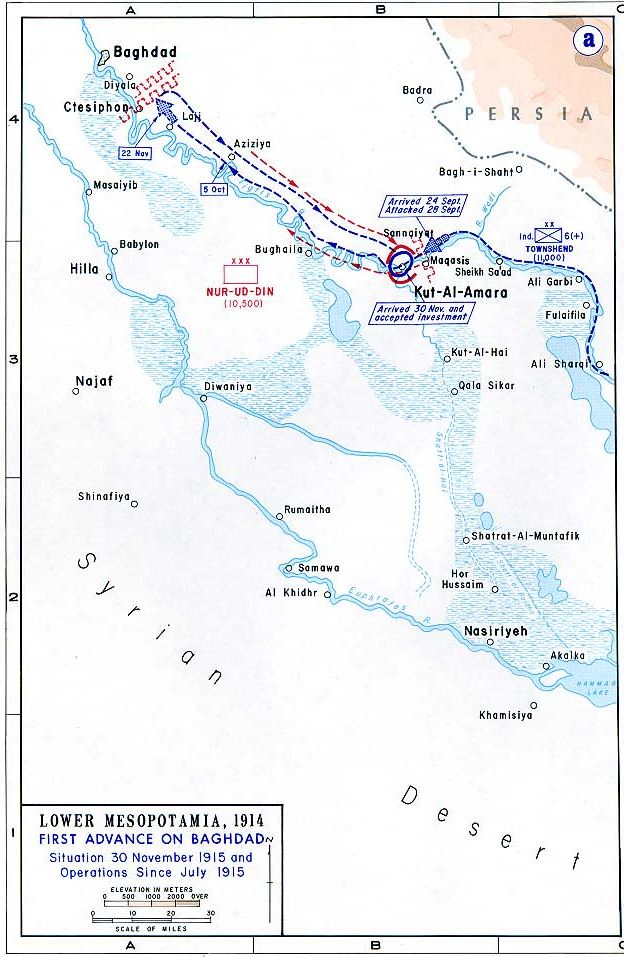
November, British offensive

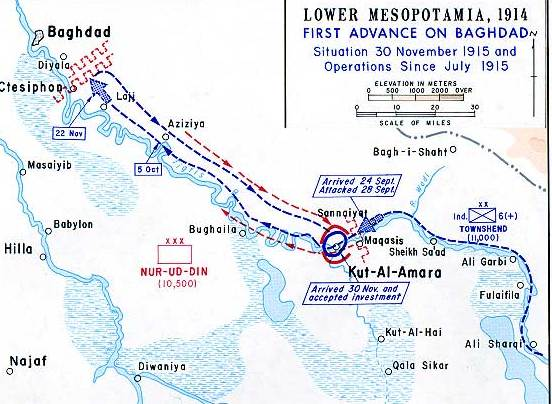
November, British offensive (detail)

On 2 January, Süleyman Askerî Bey took over as head of the Iraq Area Command. With Gallipoli, the Caucasus, and Palestine taking priority, the Ottoman Army had few resources to move to Mesopotamia. Süleyman Askerî Bey sent letters to Arab sheiks in an attempt to organise them to fight against the British. He wanted to retake the Shatt-al-Arab region at any cost.

Early on the morning of 12 April, Süleyman Askerî attacked the British camp at Shaiba in what became known as the Battle of Shaiba. He had about 4,000 regular troops and about 14,000 Arab irregulars provided by Arab sheiks. Although the irregulars proved ineffective, the Ottoman infantry launched a series of relentless attacks on the fortified British camp and later attempted by bypass it. When the British cavalry and infantry counterattacked the defensive forces Suleyman Askari pulled his troops back. The next day the British attacked his defensive positions. It was a hard-fought infantry battle in which the British infantry overcame tough Ottoman opposition. Ottoman losses numbered 2400 men killed, wounded, or taken prisoner, as well as two artillery field pieces. The retreat ended 75 miles (120 kilometres) up the river at Hamisiye. Süleyman Askerî had been wounded at Shaiba. Disappointed and depressed, he shot himself at the hospital in Baghdad. In his place Colonel Nureddin was appointed commander of the Iraq Area Command on 20 April 1915. Nureddin was one of the few officers to reach high command without the benefit of a staff college education. He did, however, have extensive combat experience.

Due to the unexpected success British command reconsidered their plan and General Sir John Nixon was sent in April 1915 to take command. He ordered Charles Vere Ferrers Townshend to advance to Kut or even to Baghdad if possible. Townshend and his small army advanced up the Tigris river. They defeated several Ottoman forces sent to halt him. In July 1915, a force led by G. F. Gorringe captured the city of Nasiriyah, capturing the Turks' largest supply depot in southern Mesopotamia. Although his advance was very difficult to sustain logistically, it was maintained.

In late September 1915, amidst the recent defeat of Serbia and entry of Bulgaria into the war and concerns about German attempts to incite jihad in Persia and Afghanistan, Grey (Foreign Secretary) and other politicians encouraged a further 100-mile (160-kilometre) push to Baghdad. The CIGS Murray thought this logistically unwise, but Kitchener advised the Dardanelles Committee (21 October) that Baghdad be seized for the sake of prestige, then abandoned.

Enver Pasha worried about the possible fall of Baghdad. He realised the mistake of underestimating the importance of the Mesopotamian campaign. He ordered the 35th Division and Mehmet Fazıl Pasha to return to Mosul, their old location. The 38th Division was reconstituted. The Sixth Army was created on 5 October 1915, and its commander was a 72-year-old German general, Colmar von der Goltz. Von der Goltz was a famous military historian who had written several classic books on military operations. He had also spent many years working as a military adviser in the Ottoman Empire. However, he was in Thrace commanding the Ottoman First Army and would not reach the theatre for some time. Colonel Nureddin the former commander of the Iraq Area Command was still in charge on the ground.

On 22 November, Townshend and Nureddin fought a battle at Ctesiphon, a town 25 miles (40 kilometres) south of Baghdad. The conflict lasted five days. The battle was a stalemate as both the Ottomans and the British ended up retreating from the battlefield. Townshend concluded that a full scale retreat was necessary. However, Nureddin realised the British were retreating and cancelled his retreat, then followed the British. Townshend withdrew his division in good order back to Kut-al-Amara. He halted and fortified the position. Nureddin pursued with his forces. He tried to encircle the British with his XVIII Corps composed of the 45th Division, 51st Division and 2nd Tribal Cavalry Brigade. The exhausted and depleted British force was urged back to the defences of Kut-al-Amara. The retreat finalised on 3 December. Nureddin encircled the British at Kut-al-Amara, and sent other forces down river to prevent the British from marching to the relief of the garrison.

The Mesopotamian Half Flight from Australia was formed in 1915 to give air support. On 7 December, the siege of Kut began. From the Ottoman perspective the siege prevented the Sixth Army from performing other operations. From the British perspective defending Kut, as opposed to retreating back to Basra, was a mistake since Kut was isolated. It could be defended, but it could not be resupplied. Von der Goltz helped the Ottoman forces build defensive positions around Kut. The Sixth Army was reorganised into two corps, the XIII and the XVIII. Nureddin Pasha gave command to Von der Goltz. With the reorganisation, the Sixth Army laid siege to the British. New fortified positions established down river fended off any attempt to rescue Townshend. Townshend suggested an attempt to break out, but this was initially rejected by Sir John Nixon; however he relented. Nixon established a relief force under the command of General Fenton Aylmer. Aylmer made three major attempts to break the siege, but each effort was unsuccessful.

=== 1916 ===
On 20 January, Enver Pasha replaced Nureddin Pasha with Colonel Halil Kut (Khalil Pasha). Nureddin Pasha did not want to work with a German general. He sent a telegram to the War Ministry "The Iraq Army has already proven that it does not need the military knowledge of Goltz Pasha ..." After the first failure, General Nixon was replaced by General Lake. British forces received small quantities of supplies from the air. These drops were not enough to feed the garrison, though. Halil Kut forced the British to choose between starving and surrendering, though in the meantime they would try to lift the siege.

Between January and March 1916, Townshend and Aylmer launched several attacks to lift the siege. The attacks took place at the Battle of Sheikh Sa'ad, the Battle of the Wadi, the Battle of Hanna, and the Battle of Dujaila Redoubt. These series of British attempts to break through the encirclement did not succeed and their costs were heavy. Both sides suffered high casualties. In February, XIII Corps received 2nd Infantry Division as a reinforcement. Food and hopes were running out for Townshend in Kut-al-Amara. Disease was spreading rapidly and could not be cured.

On 19 April Field Marshal Von der Goltz died of cholera. On 24 April, an attempt by the steamer Julnar to supply the town by river failed. With that there was no way the British could supply Kut. Rather than wait for reinforcements, Townshend surrendered on 29 April 1916. The remaining force in Kut-al-Amara of 13,164 soldiers became captives of the Ottomans.

The British viewed the loss of Kut as a humiliating defeat. It had been many years since such a large body of British soldiers had surrendered. Also this loss followed only four months after the British defeat at the Battle of Gallipoli. Nearly all the British commanders involved in the failure to rescue Townshend were removed from command. The Ottomans proved they were good at holding defensive positions against superior forces.

The British refused to let the defeat at Kut stand. Further attempts to advance in Mesopotamia were ordered by the politicians on the War Committee (18 September), including Curzon and Chamberlain, who argued that there would be no net savings in troops if a passive policy in the Middle East encouraged Muslim unrest in India, Persia and Afghanistan, and despite the opposition of Robertson.

A major problem for the British was the lack of logistical infrastructure. When ships arrived at Basra, they had to be unloaded by small boats which then unloaded their cargo which was then stored in warehouses, which there were not enough of in Basra. Ships often sat for days waiting to be unloaded. Then supplies had to be sent north along the river in shallow draft river steamers because there were almost no roads north. Usually the amount of supplies being sent north was barely adequate to supply the forces in place. A plan to build a railway was rejected by the Indian Government in 1915, but after Kut it was approved. After the defeat at Kut, the British made a major effort to improve the ability to move men and equipment into theatre, and keep them supplied. The port at Basra was greatly improved so that ships could be quickly unloaded. Good roads were built around Basra. Rest camps and supply dumps were created to receive men and material from the port. More and better river steamers were put into service moving supplies up river. New hospitals were also set up to better care for the sick and wounded. As a result, the British were able to bring more troops and equipment to the front lines and keep them properly supplied for a new offensive.

The new commander, General Stanley Maude, with secret orders from Robertson not to attempt to take Baghdad, was given additional reinforcements and equipment. For the next six months he trained and organised his army. At the same time, the Ottoman Sixth Army was growing weaker. Khalil Pasha received very few replacements, and ended up disbanding the weak 38th Division and used its soldiers as replacements for his other divisions, the 46th, 51st, 35th, and 52nd. Robertson changed his mind when it seemed that the Russians might advance to Mosul, removing any Turkish threat to Mesopotamia, and authorised Maude to attack in December 1916.

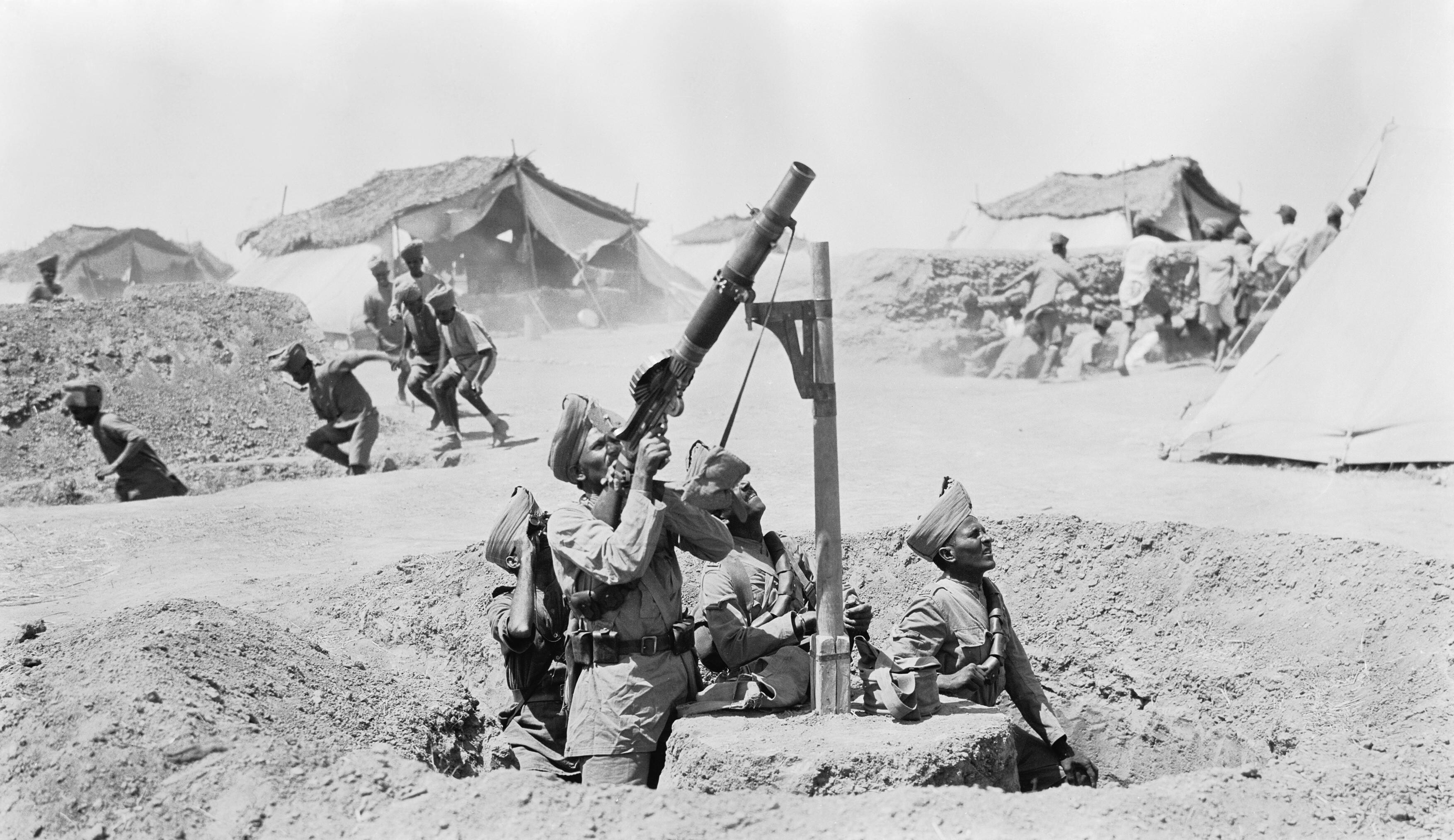
Indian anti-aircraft machine gunners in action during the Battle of Sheikh Sa'ad

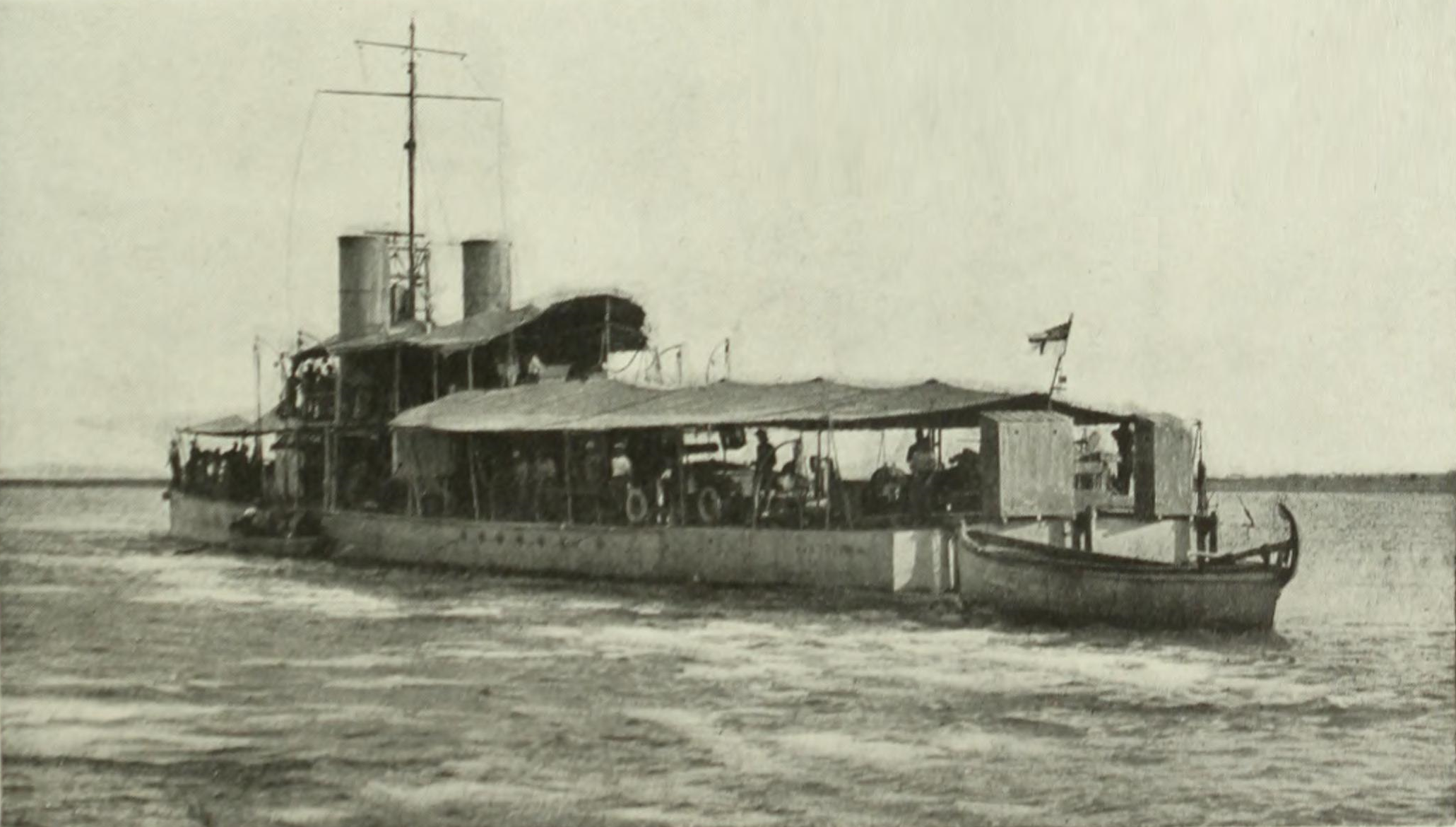
British gun boat on the Tigris

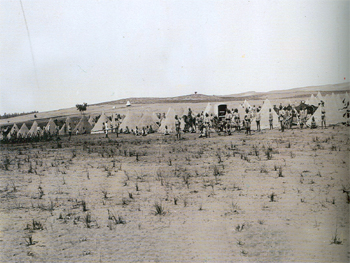
Ottoman Sixth Army field HQ

=== 1917 ===
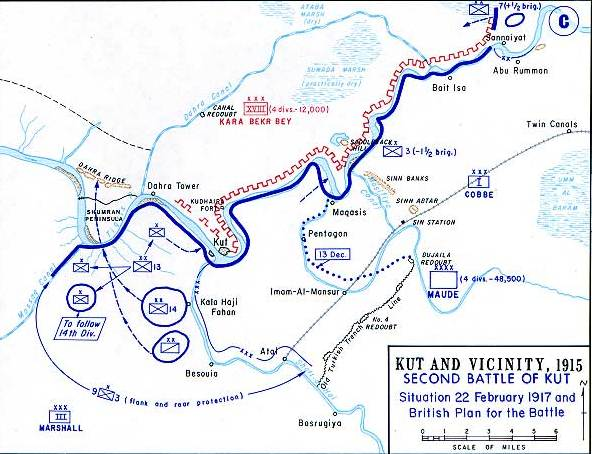
1917, General Maude's Army captures Kut

Maude's offensive was launched on 13 December 1916. The British advanced up both sides of the Tigris river, forcing the Ottoman army out of a number of fortified positions along the way. General Maude's offensive was methodical, organised, and successful. Khalil Pasha was able to concentrate most of his forces against Maude near Kut. Maude switched his advance to the other bank of the Tigris, bypassing most of the Ottoman forces. The Ottoman XVIII Corps escaped destruction only by fighting some desperate rear guard actions. It did lose quite a bit of equipment and supplies. The British occupied Kut and continued to advance up the Tigris.

By early March, the British were at the outskirts of Baghdad, and the Baghdad garrison, under the command of the Governor of Baghdad province Halil Kut (Khalil Pasha), tried to stop them on the Diyala river. Maude outmanoeuvred the Ottoman forces, destroyed an Ottoman regiment and captured the Ottoman defensive positions. Khalil Pasha retreated in disarray out of the city. On 11 March 1917, the British entered Baghdad and immediately restored order, putting a stop to rioting and looting by local Arabs and Kurds. The British Indian Army played a significant role in the capture of Baghdad. Amidst the confusion of the retreat a large part of the Ottoman army (some 15,000 soldiers) were captured. A week after the city fell, Maude issued the oft-quoted Proclamation of Baghdad, which contained the famous line "our armies do not come into your cities and lands as conquerors or enemies, but as liberators".

Khalil Pasha withdrew his battered Sixth Army up river and established his headquarters in Mosul. He had about 30,000 troops left with which to oppose Maude. In April, he received the 2nd Infantry Division, but overall the Ottoman strategic position was bad in the spring of 1917. After the capture of Baghdad, Maude stopped his advance. He felt his supply lines were too long, conditions in the summer made campaigning difficult and he had been denied reinforcements he felt he needed. Maude died of cholera on 18 November. He was replaced by General William Marshall who halted operations for the winter.

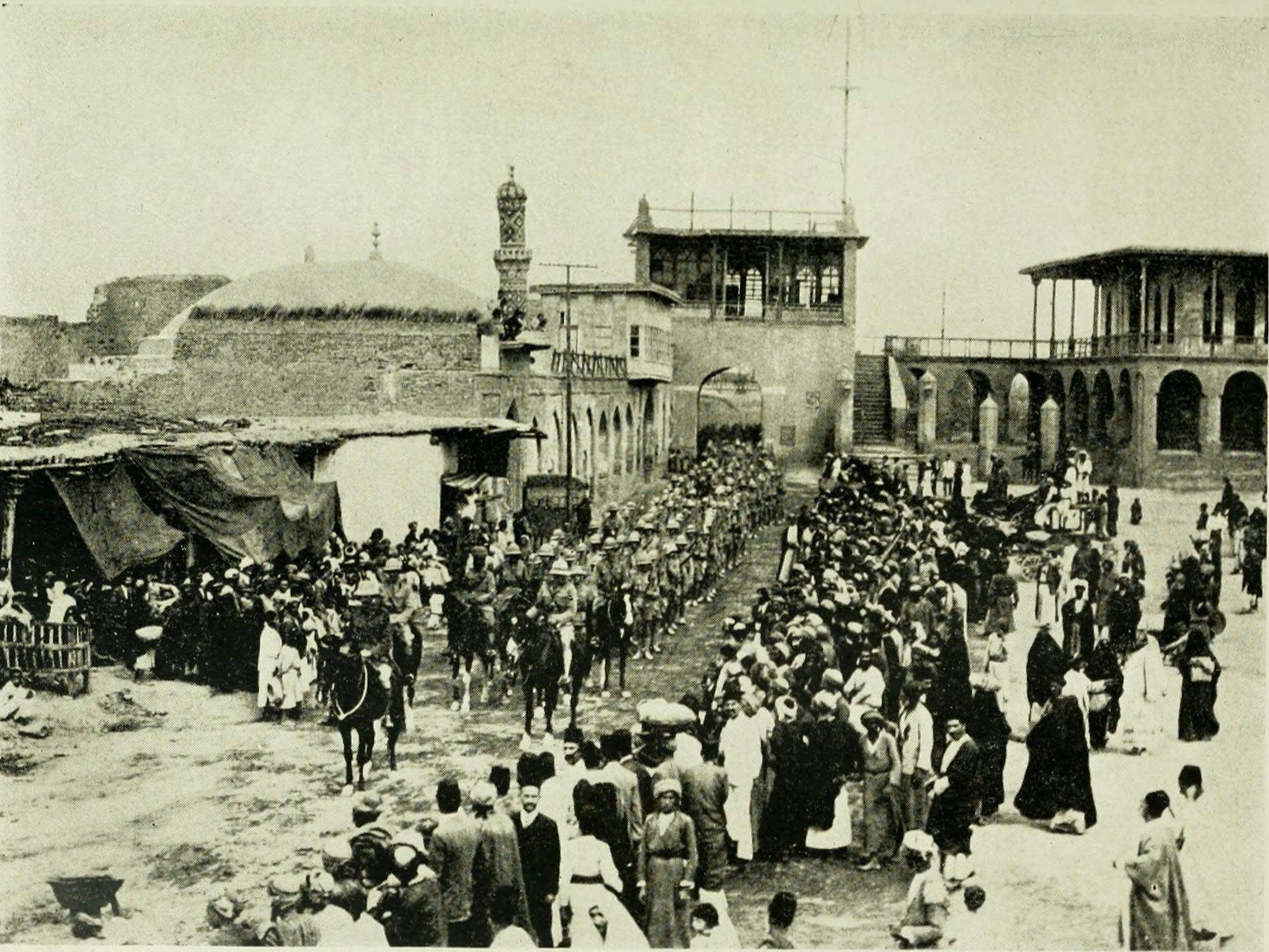
British troops entering Baghdad, March 1917.

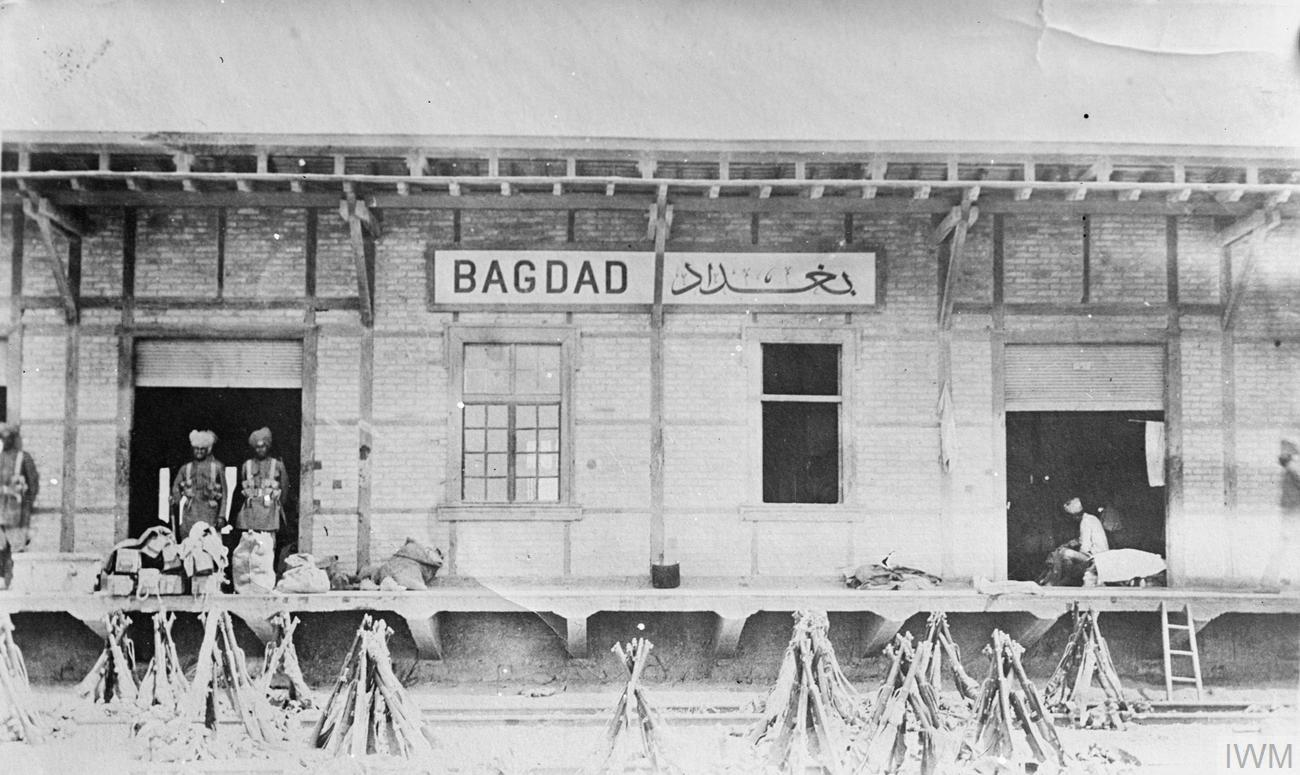
Indian troops guarding Baghdad railway station.

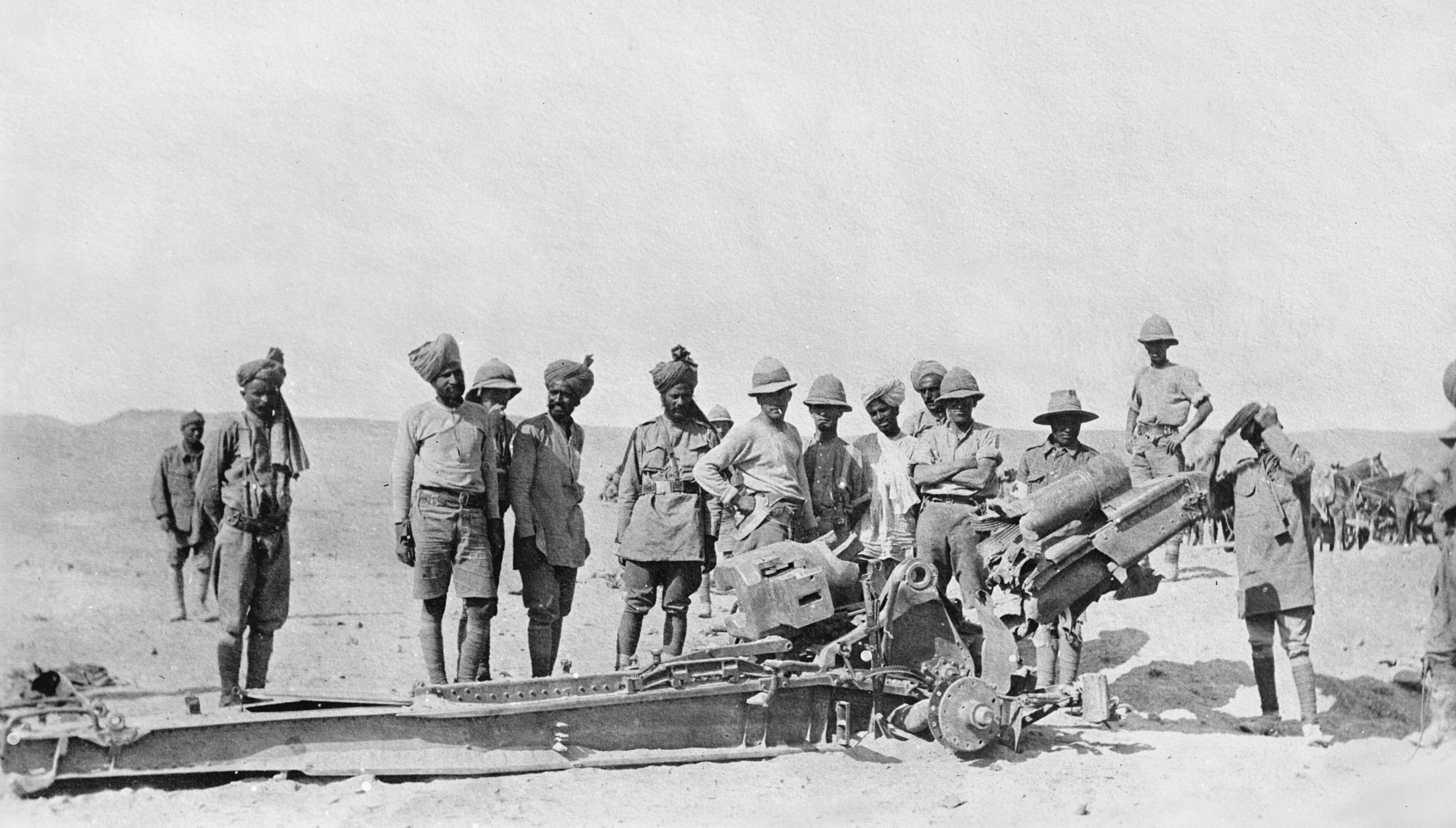
British and Indian troops examining a wrecked Turkish artillery gun.

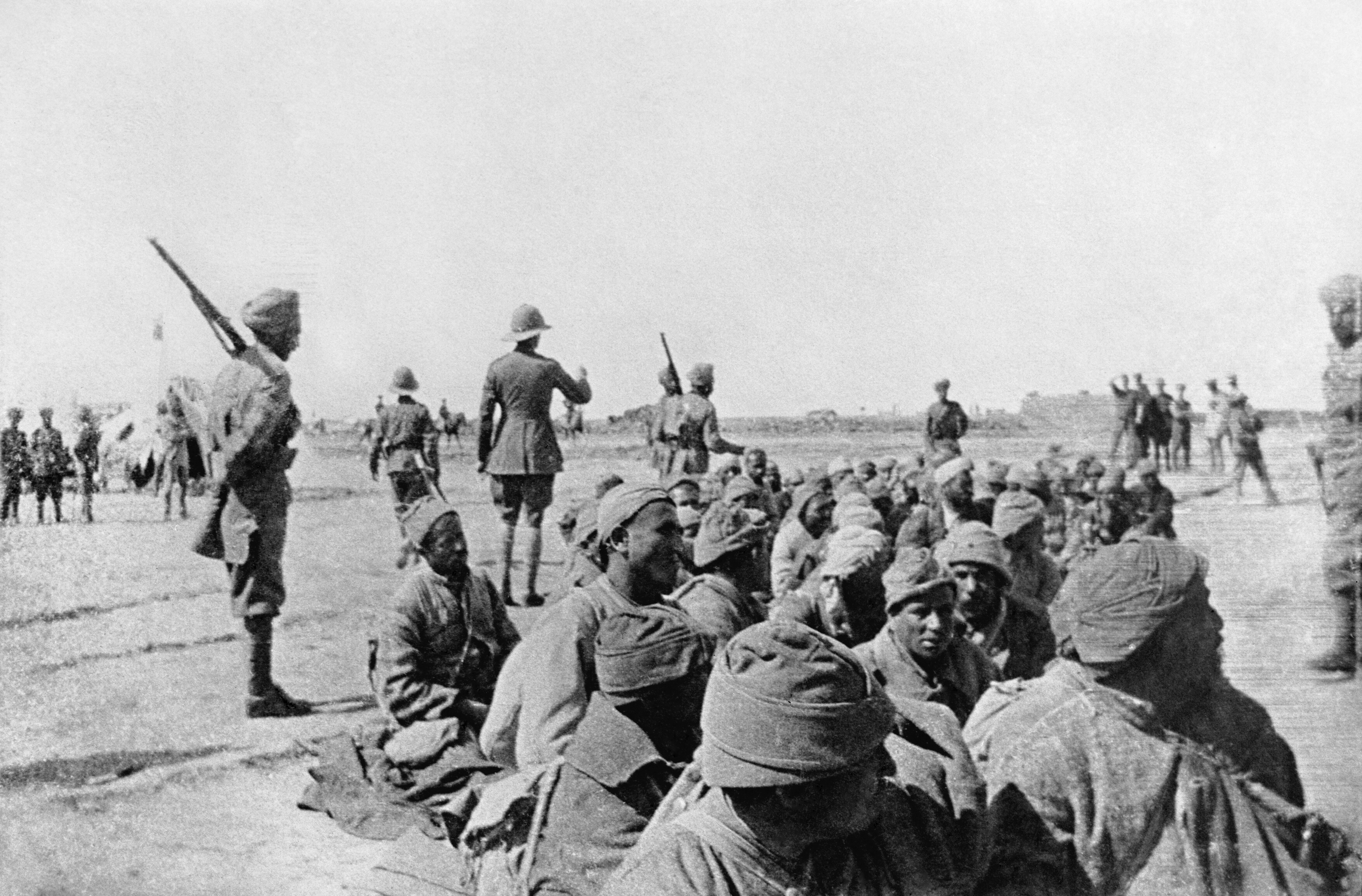
Indian troops guarding Turkish prisoners captured at Sannaiyat, 24 February 1917.

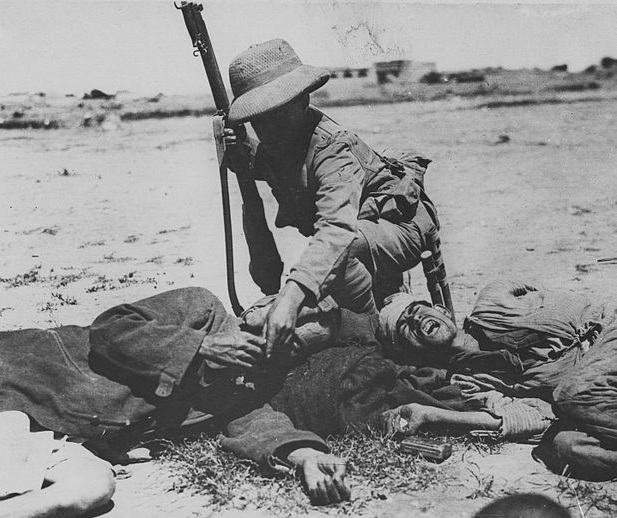
British soldier feeding a starving Turkish soldier.

=== 1918 ===
The British resumed their offensive in late February 1918 capturing Hīt and Khan al Baghdadi in March, and Kifri in April. In March 1918, Britain faced an uprising by a rebel organisation called Jam'iya al-Nahda al-Islamiya in Najaf, and laid siege to the city until May, when the rebels surrendered. For the rest of the 1918, the British had to move troops to the Sinai and Palestine Campaign in support of the Battle of Megiddo. General Marshall moved some of the forces east in support of Dunsterforce (General Lionel Dunsterville) in Persia during the summer of 1918. His very powerful army was "astonishingly inactive, not only in the hot season but through most of the cold". The fight in Mesopotamia was not wanted any more.

Negotiation of armistice conditions between the Allies and the Ottoman Empire began with the turn of October. General Marshall, following instructions from the War Office that "every effort was to be made to score as heavily as possible on the Tigris before the whistle blew", went on the offensive for the last time. General Alexander Cobbe commanded a British force from Baghdad on 23 October 1918. Within two days it covered 120 kilometres, reaching the Little Zab River, where it met and engaged Ismail Hakki Bey's Sixth Army, most of which was captured in the resulting Battle of Sharqat.

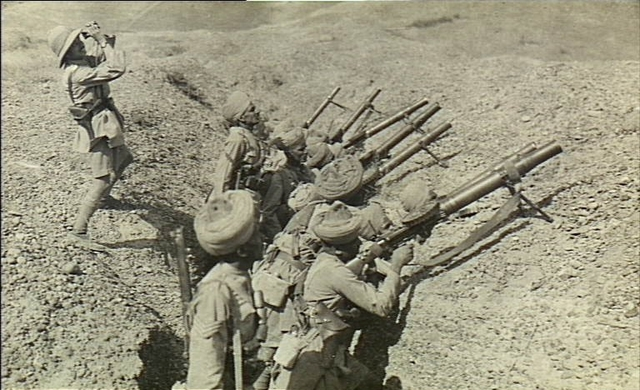
Indian troops prepare to fire against enemy aircraft with Lewis guns.

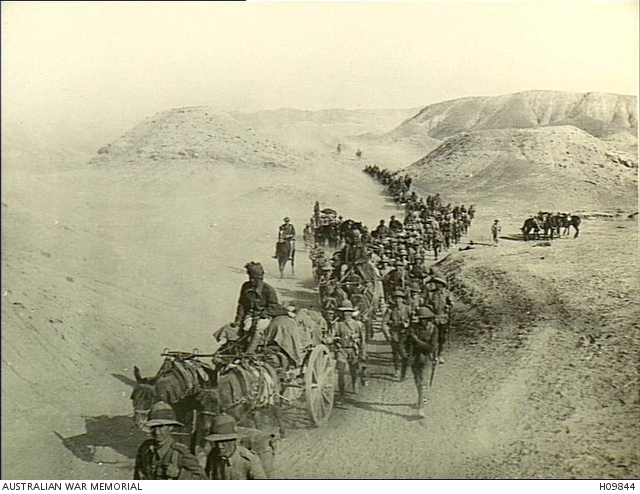
British and Indian troops cross through the Jebel Hamarin pass.

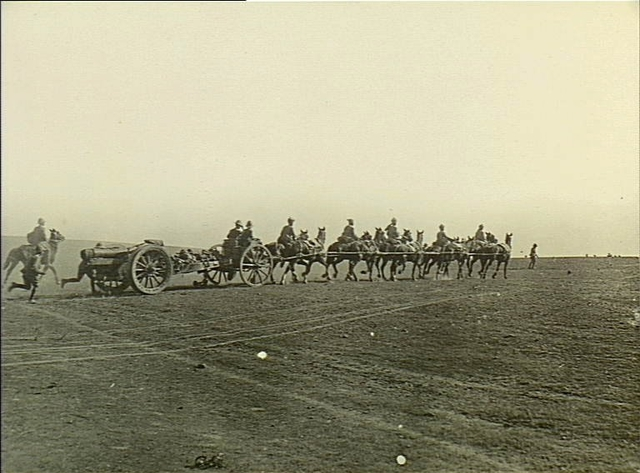
Reaching Little Zab River, 120 kilometres in two days.

== Armistice of Mudros, October ==
On 30 October 1918, the Armistice of Mudros was signed and both parties remained in position. General Marshall accepted the surrender of Khalil Pasha and the Ottoman 6th Army on the same day but Cobbe did not stand fast as the armistice required and continued to advance on Mosul in the face of Turkish protests. British troops marched unopposed into the city on the 14 November 1918. The ownership of Mosul Province and its rich oil fields became an international issue. The war in Mesopotamia ended on 14 November 1918, fifteen days after the Armistice of Mudros, a day after the occupation of Constantinople, and three days after the armistice of 11 November 1918.

Commanders

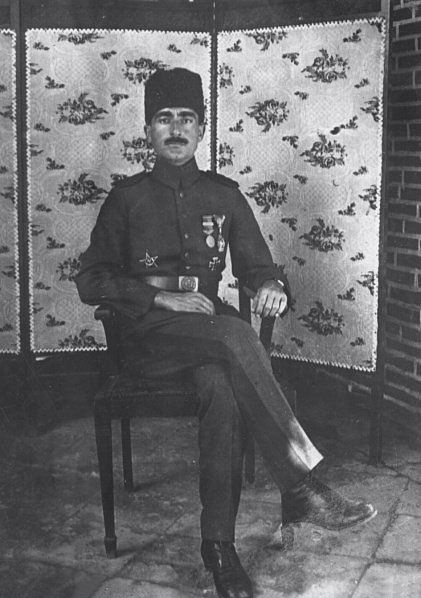
Mirliva Khalil Pasha

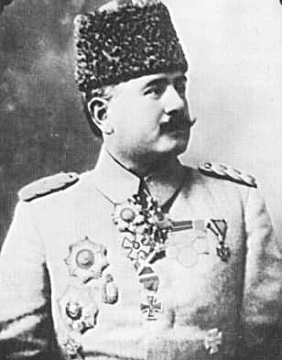
Miralay Kâzım Bey

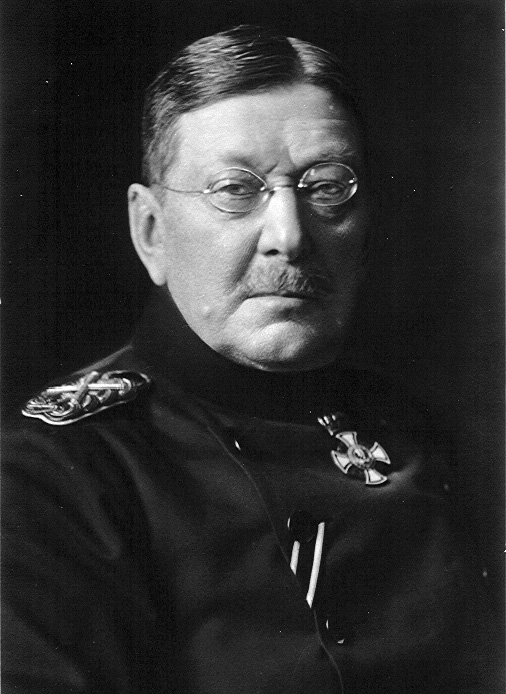
Müşir Goltz Pasha

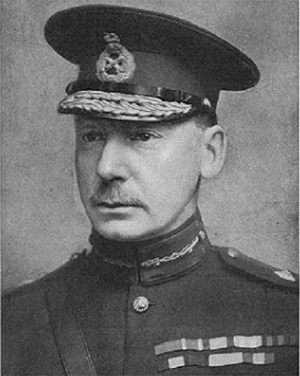
Major General Townshend

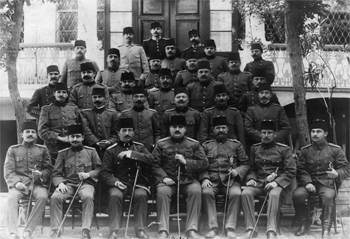
Sixth Army Staff

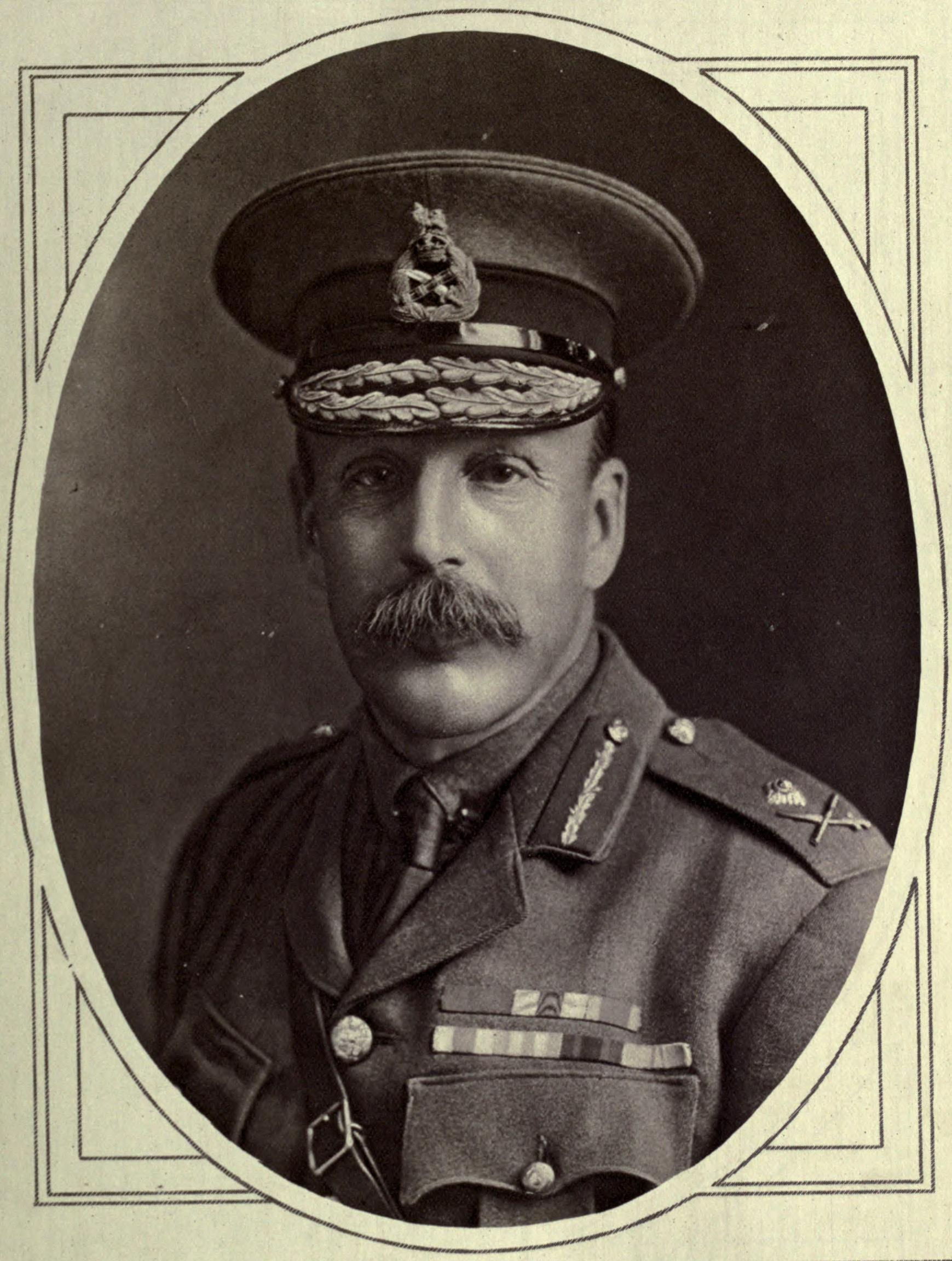
Sir Frederick Stanley Maude

== Aftermath ==
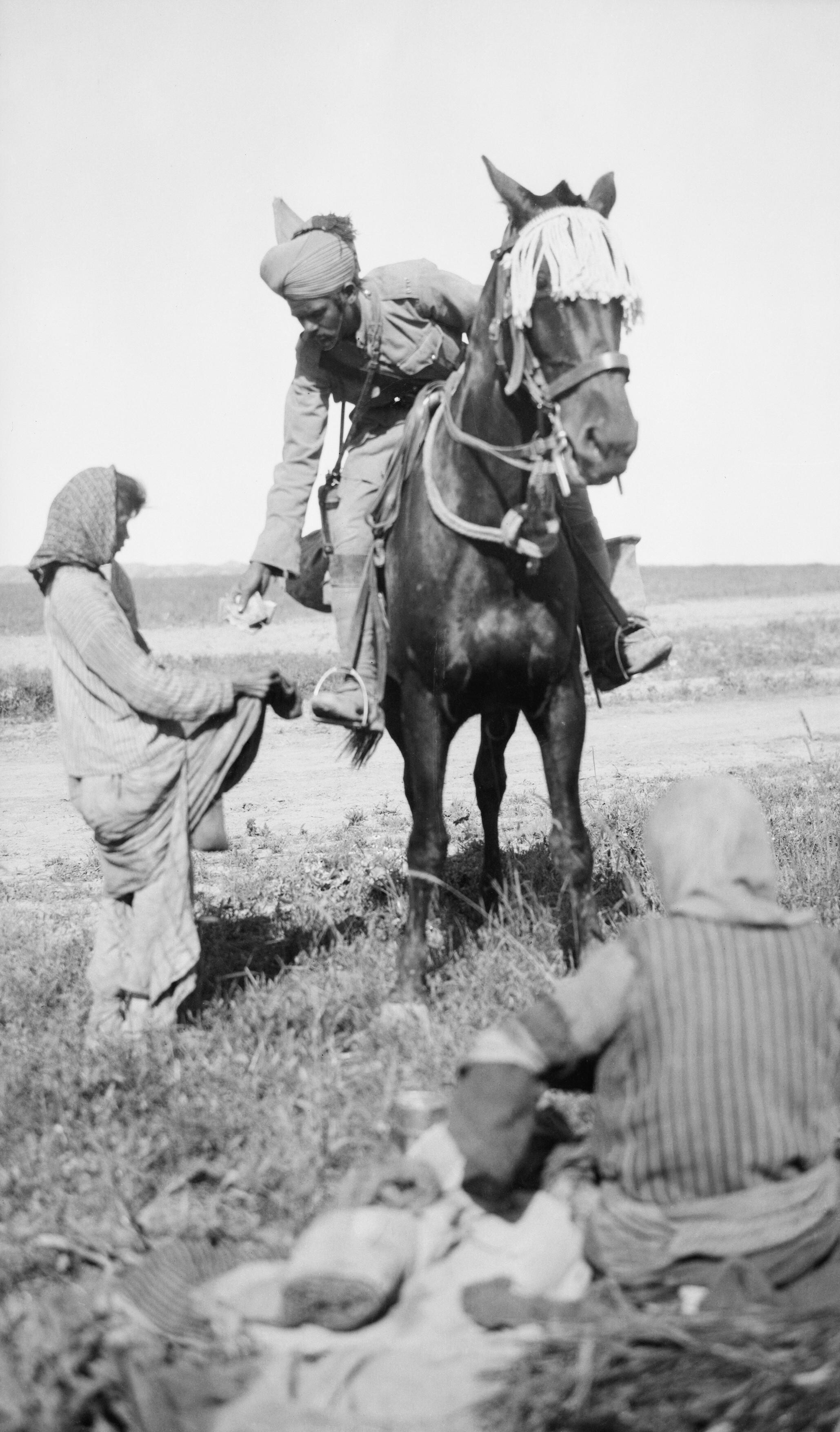
Indian Cavalryman shares his rations with starving Christian girls

With British Indian forces already on the ground, the British imported civil servants from India who had previous knowledge and experience of running a colonial government. The expulsion of the Ottomans from the region shook the centuries-old power balance. Arabs who believed that the Ottoman expulsion would lead to greater independence, and fought against the Ottoman forces along the Allies, faced another dilemma. They were disappointed with the arrangements regarding the establishment of British Mandate of Mesopotamia.

Three important anticolonial secret societies had been formed in the region during 1918 and 1919. At Najaf, Jamiyat an Nahda al Islamiya (The League of the Islamic Awakening) was organised. Al Jamiya al Wataniya al Islamiya (The Muslim National League) was formed with the object of organising and mobilising the population for major resistance. In February 1919, in Baghdad, a coalition of Shia merchants, Sunni teachers and civil servants, Sunni and Shia ulama, and Iraqi officers formed the Haras al Istiqlal (the Guardians of Independence). The Istiqlal had member groups in Karbala, Najaf, Kut and Hillah. The British were in a precarious situation with the Issue of Mosul. They were adopting almost desperate measures to protect their interests. The Iraqi revolt against the British developed just after they declared their authority. It was put down by the RAF Iraq Command during the summer of 1920.

The Ottoman parliament mostly accepted the cession of the region, but they had a different view on the issue of Mosul. They declared the Misak-ı Milli. Misak-ı Milli stated that the Mosul Province was a part of their heartland, based on a common past, history, concept of morals and laws. Presumably, from a British perspective, if Mustafa Kemal Atatürk succeeded in securing the stability in his efforts to establish Republic of Turkey, he would have turned his attention to recovering Mosul and penetrate into Mesopotamia, where the native population would probably join him. The British Foreign Secretary attempted to disclaim any existence of oil in the Mosul area. On 23 January 1923, Lord Curzon argued that the existence of oil was no more than hypothetical. According to Armstrong, "England wanted oil. Mosul and Kurds were the key".

== Casualties ==
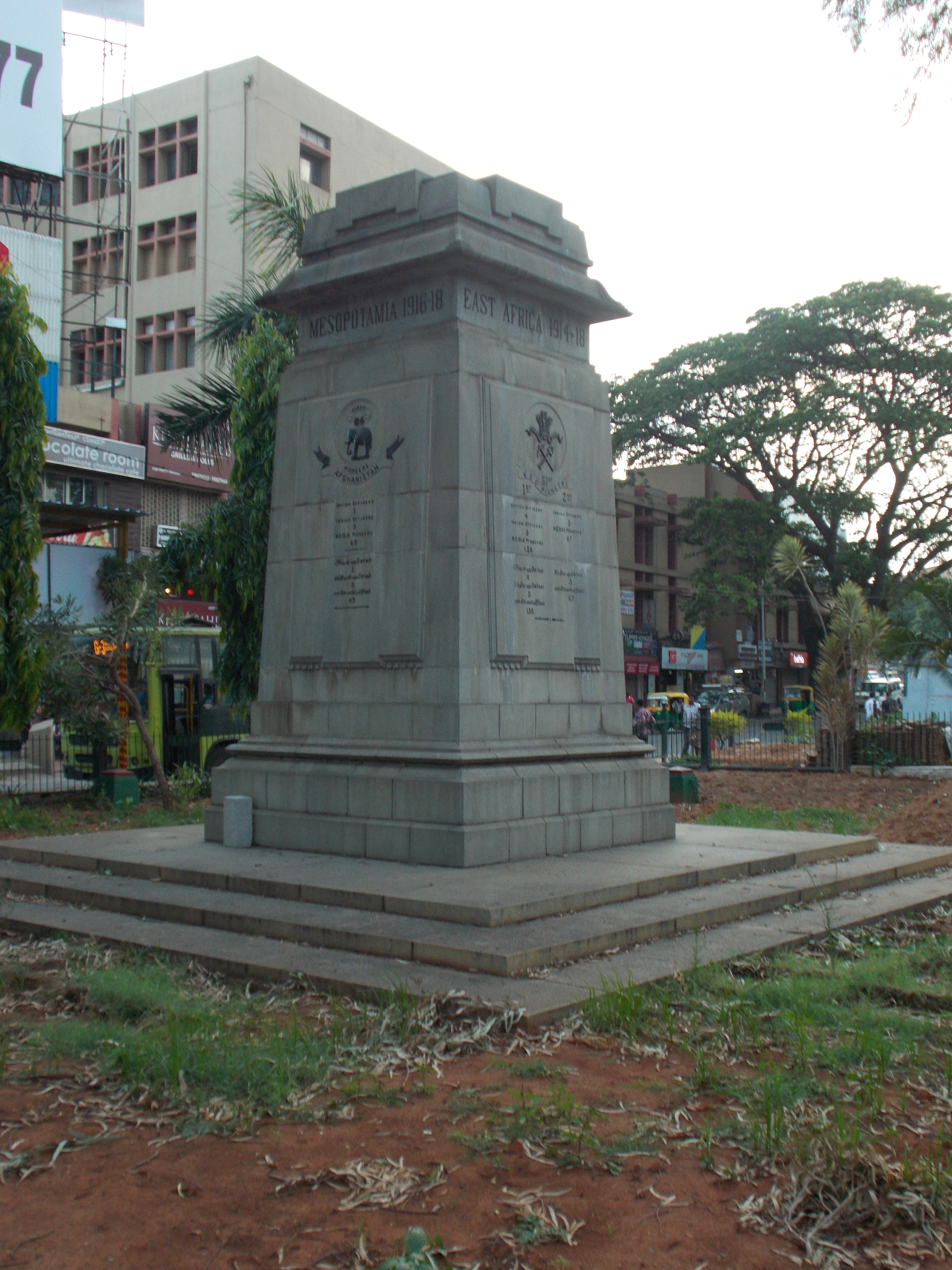
Madras Regiment War Memorial, Bangalore, mentions lives lost in Mesopotamia by the Madras Sappers.

British Empire forces suffered 85,197 battle casualties in Mesopotamia. There were also 820,418 hospitalisations for non-battle causes, mostly sickness. Of those, 16,712 died, 634,889 were treated and returned to duty and 154,343 were permanently evacuated from the theatre. Those evacuated accounted for some 18.8 per cent of total non-battle casualties, while those who died were 2 per cent. By comparison, 49 per cent of those wounded in battle (26,814 men) were evacuated, and 8.9 per cent (5,281) died. Thousands more died outside Mesopotamia from injuries and sickness incurred here or died in Ottoman captivity.

Many Indian and British prisoners of war were subjected to brutal treatment while being moved 700 mi (1,100 km) to prison camps in Anatolia within Turkey proper, eg the Afion Kara Hisar Camp. Many died en route and the worst part of the transfer was the 250 mi (400 km) forced march from Mosul to Ras-el-Ain for which they were allowed 0.24 imp gal (1.1 L) of water, and many were clubbed to death by guards. There they were locked into railway trucks for three days and nights for the trip to Turkey proper.

Total British military deaths in the Mesopotamian Campaign, including from the latter causes, were 38,842 (1,434 officers and 37,408 men), including 28,578 from sickness and other non-battle causes (including prisoners). The unusually high ratio of non-battle to battle casualties in Mesopotamia, and the unusually high incidence of permanent losses among non-battle casualties had much to do with the geography of the area of operations. It was unhygienic, extremely hot in the summer, extremely cold in the winter, composed primarily of either sandy deserts or marshes, and was underdeveloped, meaning men had to be transported long distances for medical attention.

The Ottomans suffered 325,000 casualties on the Mesopotamian Campaign. Deaths from disease were double the Ottoman deaths in battle in the First World War and greater than this in Mesopotamia. Ottoman irrecoverable battle casualties totalled 55,858 (13,069 KIA, 22,385 WIA, 20,404 POW). They were divided up as follows:

- Basra 1914: 1,400 (100 KIA, 200 WIA, 1,200 POW)
- Qurna 1914: 1,495 (150 KIA, 300 WIA, 1,045 POW)
- Shaiba 1915: 6,700 (2,000 KIA, 4,000 WIA, 700 POW)
- 1st Kut 1915: 5,200 (1,600 KIA, 2,400 WIA, 1,200 POW)
- Ctesiphon 1915: 14,700 (4,500 KIA, 9,000 WIA, 1,200 POW)
- Siege of Kut 1915/1916: 4,000 (1,600 KIA, 2,400 WIA)
- Relief of Kut 1916: 3,541 (619 KIA, 1,585 WIA, 1,337 POW)
- 2nd Kut/Baghdad 1917: 6,000 (2,000 KIA, 4,000 WIA)
- Mesopotamia 1918 total: 12,822 (500 KIA, 1,000 WIA, 11,322 POW)

The WIA figures only include irrecoverable losses (crippled or died of wounds). Going by Erickson's estimates, the total of wounded outnumbered seriously wounded by 2.5:1 for the war. Applying that same ratio to the Mesopotamia Campaign produces a total battle casualty count of about 89,500 (13,069 KIA, 56,000 WIA, 20,404 POW). By the end of 1918 the British had deployed 350,000–410,000 men in the theatre, 112,000 of them front-line troops. The vast majority of the British empire forces in this campaign were members of the British Indian Army.

=== Public impact of the war ===
In 1915 Baghdad, at the time under Ottoman administration, 300 people died daily of cholera. By comparison, Basra under British administration fared far better. Mosul was even worse:

Conditions in the city of Mosul, especially after the fall of Baghdad, were even worse than in Baghdad, partly because of Turkish maladministration and partly because of the ever-increasing food shortage and flow of refugees from the neighbouring areas. By 1918 the city of Mosul was in a state of famine. An Arab official, who was in Mosul at the time, gives an account of absolutely deplorable conditions, with the Municipal officials accompanied by porters touring the city every day to collect dead bodies thrown into the streets. Dogs and cats were used for food, and a speedy British occupation was looked forward to as the only way out of the disaster.

== Battles of the campaign ==
- Fao Landing
- Fall of Basra
- Battle of Qurna
- Battle of Shaiba
- Battle of Es Sinn
- Battle of Ctesiphon
- Siege of Kut
  Attempts to Relieve Kut:
  - Battle of Sheikh Sa'ad
  - Battle of the Wadi
  - Battle of Hanna
  - Battle of Dujaila Redoubt
  - First Battle of Kut
- Battle of Khanaqin
- Second Battle of Kut
- Fall of Baghdad
- Samarra offensive
- Battle of Jebel Hamlin
- Battle of Istabulat
- Battle of Ramadi
- Action of Khan Baghdadi
- Battle of Sharqat

== See also ==
- Mesopotamian Half Flight
- Ottoman Empire
- Dissolution of the Ottoman Empire
- Tanzimat
- Second Constitutional Era of the Ottoman Empire
- Young Turks
