= Battle of Khanaqin =

Battle in Iraq in WWI

- Part of World War I and the Mesopotamian Campaign
Date	4 June 1916 (Note: The date of this battle is disputed, some sources say 4 June 1916, while others say 3 June 1916. What we know is that it took place on either one of these dates, but most likely 4 June 1916. There may have been some small skirmishes on 3 June, but the actual battle likely began on 4 June.)
Location	Khanaqin, Ottoman Empire
Result	Ottoman victory

Belligerents
Russia	Ottoman Empire

Commanders and leaders
Nikolai Baratov	(Ottoman Empire) Ali İhsan Bey

Units involved
5th Caucasus Army Corps	XIII Corps

Strength
15,000 infantry 7,500 cavalry	25,000

Casualties and losses
>500 killed Many wounded	~400 killed

The Battle of Khanaqin was fought during World War I which took place in modern-day Iraq. This battle was the only Russian engagement fought by the Russian Army on the Mesopotamian Front of World War I. The battle likely took place on 4 June 1916, however, some sources state that it took place on 3 June 1916. Baghdad commander Khalil Pasha dispatched Ali İhsan Bey's XIII Corps to meet and drive the Russian force back from Khanaqin to prepare for a proposed invasion of Persia en route to attacking British rear positions. Before this battle, General Baratov previously attempted to capture Khanaqin on 7 May 1916. Although the Ottomans won the Battle of Khanaqin, the United Kingdom used the advantage of the distracted Ottoman forces to conquest Baghdad. After Ali İhsan Bey was called away from Khanaqin to return to Baghdad in February 1917 in an unsuccessful attempt to combat the invading British forces, the Russians occupied the city of Khanaqin.
