= List of military engagements of World War I =

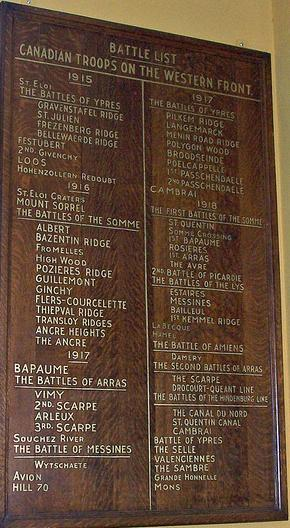
List of Canadian battles during the First World War on the Western Front plaque in Currie Hall, Royal Military College of Canada

This list of military engagements of World War I covers terrestrial, maritime, and aerial conflicts, including campaigns, operations, defensive positions, and sieges. Campaigns generally refer to broader strategic operations conducted over a large bit of territory and over a long period of time. Battles generally refer to short periods of intense combat localized to a specific area and over a specific period of time. However, use of the terms in naming such events is not consistent. For example, the First Battle of the Atlantic was more or less an entire theatre of war, and the so-called battle lasted for the duration of the entire war.

== European theatre (1914–1918) ==
=== Western Front (1914–1918) ===
1914

- German invasion of Luxembourg
- Skirmish at Joncherey
- Battle of Liège
- Battle of the Frontiers
  - Battle of Mulhouse
  - Battle of Lorraine
    - Battle of Sarrebourg
    - Battle of Morhange
  - Battle of the Ardennes
    - Siege of Longwy
    - Battle of Rossignol
    - Battle of Neufchâteau
- Battle of Charleroi
- Battle of Mons
- Great Retreat
  - Siege of Maubeuge
  - Battle of Le Cateau
  - Battle of St. Quentin, also called the Battle of Guise
- First Battle of the Marne
  - Battle of Saint-Gond Marshes
  - Battle of Ourcq, also called the Battle of Multien
  - Battle of the Two Morins
  - Battle of Revigny
  - Battle of Vitry
- First Battle of the Aisne
- Race to the Sea
  - First Battle of Picardy
  - First Battle of Albert
  - Battle of La Bassée
  - Battle of Messines
  - Battle of Armentières
  - Battle of the Yser
  - First Battle of Ypres
    - Battle of Langemarck
    - Battle of Gheluvelt
    - Battle of Nonne Bosschen
- Siege of Antwerp
  - Battle of Buggenhout
- First Battle of Arras
- Battle of Messines (1914)
- Battle of Armentières
- First Battle of Champagne

1915

- Winter operations 1914–1915
- Battle of Neuve Chapelle
- Battle of Festubert
- Second Battle of Ypres
- Second Battle of Artois
  - Battle of Aubers
- Battle of Loos
- Actions of the Hohenzollern Redoubt
- Second Battle of Champagne

1916

- Actions of the Bluff, 1916
- Battle of Verdun
  - Battle of Bois des Caures
- Hohenzollern Redoubt action, 2–18 March 1916
- Actions of St Eloi Craters
- Battle of Hulluch
- Battle of Mont Sorrel
- Raid on Hooge Chateau
- Attack on the Boar's Head
- Battle of the Somme
  - Battle of Albert (1916)
    - First day on the Somme
  - Battle of Bazentin Ridge
  - Battle of Thiepval Ridge
  - Battle of Fromelles
  - Battle of Le Transloy
  - Capture of La Boisselle
  - Attacks on High Wood
  - Capture of Le Sars
  - Capture of Lesbœufs
  - Leipzig Salient
  - Capture of Gueudecourt
  - Battle of Guillemont
  - Capture of Eaucourt l'Abbaye
  - Battle of Flers–Courcelette
  - Capture of Fricourt
  - Lochnagar mine
  - Capture of Mametz
  - Capture of Montauban
  - Battle of Morval
  - Fighting for Mouquet Farm
  - Capture of Ovillers
  - Battle of Pozières
  - Capture of Regina Trench
  - Capture of Schwaben Redoubt
  - Capture of Stuff Redoubt
  - Battle of the Ancre Heights
  - Battle of Thiepval Ridge
  - Capture of Trônes Wood
  - Capture of Combles
  - Capture of Contalmaison
  - Battle of Delville Wood
  - Attacks on the Butte de Warlencourt
  - Attack on the Boar's Head
  - Capture of Schwaben Redoubt
  - Capture of Beaumont-Hamel
  - Attack on the Gommecourt Salient
  - Battle of the Ancre
  - Battle of Pozières
  - Battle of Ginchy

1917

- Operations on the Ancre, January–March 1917
- Operation Alberich
- Nivelle Offensive
- Battle of Arras (1917)
  - German attack on Lagnicourt
  - First attack on Bullecourt
  - Battle of Vimy Ridge
  - Second Battle of the Aisne, also called the Third Battle of Champagne
- Battle of Messines
- Operation Hush
- Third Battle of Ypres, also called the Battle of Passchendaele
  - Battle of Pilckem Ridge
  - Capture of Westhoek
  - Battle of Hill 70
    - Gheluvelt Plateau actions
  - Action of the Cockcroft
  - Action of 22 August 1917
  - Battle of Polygon Wood
  - Battle of the Menin Road Ridge
  - Action of 25 September 1917
  - Actions of 30 September – 4 October 1917
  - Battle of Broodseinde
  - Battle of Poelcappelle
  - First Battle of Passchendaele
  - Action of 22 October 1917
  - Second Battle of Passchendaele
  - Night action of 1/2 December 1917
  - Action on the Polderhoek Spur
- Battle of La Malmaison
- Battle of Cambrai (1917)

1918

- German spring offensive
  - Operation Michael
    - Battle of St. Quentin, 21–23 March
    - Battle of Moreuil Wood
    - Battle of the Avre
  - Battle of the Lys, also known as the Fourth Battle of Ypres and the Operation Georgette
    - Battle of Estaires
    - Battle of Messines
    - Battle of Hazebrouck
    - Battle of Bailleul
    - Battle of Merckem
    - First Battle of Kemmel
    - Battle of Béthune
    - Second Battle of Kemmel
    - Battle of the Scherpenberg
  - Battle of Seicheprey
  - Second Battle of Morlancourt
  - Third Battle of the Aisne
  - Belleau Wood Campaign
    - Battle of Cantigny
    - Battle of Belleau Wood
    - Battle of Château-Thierry
  - Second Battle of the Marne
    - Battle of Soissons (1918)
    - Battle of Château-Thierry (1918)
    - Battle of Tardenois
- Hundred Days Offensive
  - Battle of Amiens
  - Second Battle of the Somme, also known as the Battle of St. Quentin
  - Battle of Albert (1918)
  - Battle of the Scarpe (1918)
  - Second Battle of Bapaume
  - Battle of Havrincourt
  - Battle of Saint-Mihiel
  - Battle of Épehy
  - Battle of the Canal du Nord
  - Fifth Battle of Ypres
  - Battle of St Quentin Canal
  - Battle of the Hindenburg Line
  - Meuse-Argonne Offensive, also called the Battle of the Argonne Forest
    - Battle of Chesne
    - Advance to the Meuse
  - Battle of Cambrai (1918)
  - Battle of Courtrai (1918)
  - Battle of the Selle
  - Battle of Valenciennes (1918)
  - Battle of the Sambre (1918), also known as the Second Battle of the Sambre
  - Second Battle of Mons
  - Battle of Vrigne-Meuse

=== Italian Campaign (1915–1918) ===
- Battles of the Isonzo
  - First Battle of the Isonzo
  - Second Battle of the Isonzo
  - Third Battle of the Isonzo
  - Fourth Battle of the Isonzo
  - Fifth Battle of the Isonzo
  - Sixth Battle of the Isonzo or the "Battle of Gorizia"
  - Seventh Battle of the Isonzo
  - Eighth Battle of the Isonzo
  - Ninth Battle of the Isonzo
  - Tenth Battle of the Isonzo
  - Eleventh Battle of the Isonzo
  - Twelfth Battle of the Isonzo or the "Battle of Caporetto"
- Battle of Monte Grappa
- Trentino Offensive or the "Battle of Asiago"
- Battle of mount Ortigara
- Battle of the Piave River
- Battle of San Matteo
- Battle of Vittorio Veneto
- German/Bavarian occupation of South Tyrol and Northern Austria

=== Eastern Front (1914–1918) ===
Campaign of 1914 (Entente victory; Russia captures Galicia, part East Prussia and part of the Carpathian Mountains, And also knocks out the Germans from Poland, disrupting their plans to destroy a group of Russian troops. As well as disrupts the Schlieffen plan, forcing Germany to fight on two fronts)

- East Prussian campaign (German victory)
  - Battle of Stallupönen (Russian victory)
  - Battle of Orlau (Russian victory)
  - Battle of Kaushen (Russian victory)
  - Battle of Gross-Bresau (Russian victory)
  - Battle of Gumbinnen (Russian victory)
  - Battle of Tannenberg (German victory)
- Destruction of Kalisz (City destroyed)
- Battle of Galicia (Decisive Russian victory)
  - Battle of Kraśnik (Austro-Hungarian victory)
  - Battle of Komarów (1914) (Austro-Hungarian victory)
  - Battle of the Zolota Lypa (Russian victory)
  - Battle of Gnila Lipa (Russian victory)
  - Battle of Rawa (Key Russian victory)
  - Battle of Gorodek (1914) (Russian victory)
  - Halich-Lviv offensive (Russian victory)
  - Battle of Jaroslawice (Russian victory)
- Battle of Laski and Anielin (Russian victory)
- Battle of Mołotków (Russian victory)
- First Battle of the Masurian Lakes (German victory)
- Battle of Augustów (1914) (Russian victory)
- Second Russian invasion of East Prussia (1914) (Russian victory)
- Battle of the Vistula River (Decisive Russian victory)
- Battle of Łódź (1914) (Russian tactical victory; German strategic victory)
- Battle of the San river (Russian victory)
- Battle of Limanowa (Central Powers victory)
- Battle of the Four Rivers (Russian victory)
- Battle of the Lupovsky Pass (Russian victory)

Campaign of 1915 (Central Powers victory, however, the Germans are unable to bring Russia out of the war. Russians return a wide strip to Galicia)

- Battle of Pakoslaw (Russian victory)
- Battle of Carpathians (Russian victory)
  - Siege of Przemysl (Russian victory)
  - Kozevo offensive (Russian victory)
  - Battle for Height 958 (Russian victory)
- Battle of Bolimov (Indecisive)
- First Battle of Przasnysz (Russian victory)
- Battle of Łomża (Partial Russian victory)
- Second Battle of the Masurian Lakes (German victory)
- Easter battle at Kalvarija (Indecisive)
- Second Battle of the Vistula River (Russian victory)
- Great Retreat (Russian) (German victory)
  - Gorlice–Tarnów offensive (Central Powers victory)
  - Battle of Syniava (Russian victory)
  - Vistula–Bug offensive (German victory)
  - Bug–Narew Offensive (German victory)
  - Skoropadsky's attack under Kraupishken (Russian victory)
  - Second battle of Przasnysz (German Tactical victory, Russian strategic victory)
  - Attack of the Dead Men (Russian victory)
  - March on Grubeshov (Russian victory)
  - Battle of Dniestr and Zolota Lypa (Partial Russian victory)
  - Riga–Šiauliai offensive (German victory)
  - Siege of Kaunas (German victory)
  - Siege of Novogeorgievsk (German victory)
  - Strypa offensive (Central Powers major victory)
  - Prut operation (Russian victory)
  - Battle of Smorgon (Russian victory)
  - Battle of Zurvno (Russian victory)
  - Vilno-Dvinsk offensive (Key Russian victory)
- Sventiany Offensive (Indecisive)

Campaign of 1916 (Russian victory; recapture Galicia and Bukovina; the Russians are forcing the Germans to stop the attacks on Verdun by their actions)

- Lake Naroch Offensive (Tactical German victory; strategic Entente victory)
- Baranovichi offensive (Central Powers victory)
- Brusilov Offensive (Russian victory)
  - Battle of Lutsk (Russian victory)
  - Battle of Kostiuchnówka (Russian victory)
  - Battle of Kowel (Central Powers victory)

Campaign of 1917 (Central Powers victory)

- Christmas Battles (Russian victory)
- Kerensky Offensive (Central Powers victory)
  - Battle of Zborov (1917) (Entente victory)
  - Battle of Borders (Russian victory; Central Powers retreat on Austria territory)
- Tarnopol offensive (Central Powers victory)
- Riga offensive (1917) (German victory)

=== Central Powers intervention in the Russian Civil War (1918) ===
(Central Powers victory, End of the eastern front and Central Powers occupation of Western Russia)

- Finnish Civil War
  - Battle of Kämärä (Red victory)
  - Battle of Vilppula (White victory)
  - Battle of Oulu (White victory)
  - Battle of Ruovesi (Red victory)
  - Battle of Tornio (1918) (White victory)
  - Battle of Antrea (Red withdrawal)
  - Invasion of Åland (1919 Ålandic status referendum)
  - Battle of Varkaus (White victory)
  - Battle of Rautu (White victory)
  - Battle of Tampere (White victory)
  - Battle of Länkipohja (White victory)
  - Battle of Lempäälä (White victory)
  - Battle of Ahvenkoski (White victory)
  - Battle of Helsinki (Central Powers and White victory)
  - Battle of Hyvinkää (Central Powers victory)
  - Battle of Lahti (White victory)
  - Battle of Hämeenlinna (White victory)
  - Battle of Viipuri (White victory)
  - Battle of Hauho (Red victory)
  - Battle of Syrjäntaka (Red victory)
- Battle of Rarańcza (Polish victory)
- Operation Faustschlag (Decisive Central Powers victory; end of Eastern front)
  - Battle of Pskov (1918)
- Battle of Bakhmach (Allied victory)
- Crimea Operation (1918) (German-Ukrainian victory)
  - Battle of Chongar Bridge (Ukrainian victory)
  - Sivash breakthrough (Ukrainian victory)
  - Battle of the Salt Lake (Ukrainian victory)
  - Battle of Sevastopol (1918) (German-Ukrainian victory)
- Battle of Dibrivka (Insurgent victory)

=== Romanian Campaign (1916–1918) ===
(part of Eastern front)

1916

- Romanian campaign (1916)
  - Battle of Transylvania (Central Powers victory)
    - Northern front of the Battle of Transylvania
    - Battle of Sibiu (1916) (Central Powers victory)
    - Battle of the Olt Valley (Romanian victory)
    - Nagyszeben Offensive (Romanian victory)
    - Battle of Nagyszeben (1916)
    - Battle of Brassó (1916) (Central Powers victory)
    - First Battle of Petrozsény (Central Powers victory)
      - Battle of Sellenberk (1916)
    - Battle of Sălătrucu
    - Petrozsény Offensive
      - First Battle of Petrozsény
      - Second Battle of Petrozsény
      - Third Battle of Petrozsény
    - Pitești–Târgoviște Retreat
    - Battle of Predeal Pass
    - Battle of Prunaru
    - Battle of Cinghinarele Island
    - First Battle of Oituz
    - Battle of Nagybár
    - Mamornița border clash
    - Battle of Mezőlivádia
    - Battle of Mount Csindrel
    - Battle of Herkulesfürdő
    - Battle of Kolun
    - Flămânda Offensive
    - Battle of Báránykút
    - Battle of Bazargic
    - Battle of Brassó (1916)
      - Battle of Vulcan Pass (Central Powers victory)
  - Dobruja Campaign
    - Battle of Turtucaia (Central Powers victory)
    - Battle of Dobrich (Bulgarian victory)
    - First Battle of Cobadin (Romanian-Russian victory)
    - Second Battle of Cobadin (Central Powers victory)
  - Operation for the Defense of the Carpathian Passes (1916)
    - Battle of Bran-Câmpulung Area (Romanian victory)
    - Battle of Prahova Valley (Romanian victory)
    - Battle of the Southern Carpathians (Romanian victory)
      - First Battle of Oituz (Romanian victory)
      - First Battle of the Jiu Valley (Romanian victory)
      - Battle of Dragoslavele (Romanian victory)
      - Battle of Târgu Jiu (Central Powers victory)
    - Battle of the Eastern Carpathians
  - Flămânda Offensive (Central Powers victory)
  - The Romanian Debacle (Central Powers victory)
    - Second Battle of the Jiu Valley (Central Powers victory)
    - Second Battle of Oituz (Romanian victory)
    - Battle of Slatina (Central Powers victory)
      - Battle of Robănești (Central Powers victory)
    - Battle of Bucharest (Central Powers victory)
      - Battle of Prunaru (de facto Romanian victory)
      - Battle of the Argeș (Central Powers victory)
    - Battle of Râmnicu Sărat (Central Powers victory)

1917

- Romanian Campaign (1917) (Russo-Romanian victory)
  - Battle of Mărăști (Romanian-Russian victory)
  - Battle of Mărășești (Romanian-Russian victory)
  - Third Battle of Oituz (Romanian-Russian victory)

1918

- Battle of Galați (Romania victory, defeat of Russia)
- Second Romanian campaign of World War I
- Coup d'état in the Duchy of Bukovina on November 6, 1918

=== Balkans theatre (1914–1918) ===
==== Serbia campaign (1914–1915) ====
- Serbian campaign (1914) (Serbian victory)
  - The first Austro-Hungarian offensive on Serbia (Serbian victory)
    - Battle of Cer (Serbian victory)
    - Srem Offensive (Austro-Hungarian victory)
    - Serbo-Montenegrin offensive in Bosnia (Without significant consequences)
  - The second Austro-Hungarian offensive on Serbia (Serbian victory, offensive stopped)
    - Battle of Drina (Inconclusive)
      - Battle of Gučevo (Serbian victory)
    - Battle of Jagodnja (Pyrrhic victory of Austria-Hungary)
  - The third Austro-Hungarian offensive on Serbia (Decisive Serbian victory, Severe defeat of Austria-Hungary, Ten-month armistice)
    - Battle of Mitrovdan (1914) (Serbian victory)
    - Battle of Kolubara (Decisive Serbian victory)
- Serbian campaign (1915) (Central Powers victory)
  - Fall of Belgrade (1915) (Central Powers victory)
  - Morava Offensive (Bulgarian victory)
    - Battle of Niš (1915) (Decisive Bulgarian victory)
  - Ovče Pole Offensive (Bulgarian victory)
  - Battle of Kosovo (1915) (Central Powers victory)
  - Battle of Čemerno (Austria-Hungary's progress slowed down)
  - Great Retreat (Serbia) (Serbian forces and refugees successfully evacuated)
  - Montenegrin campaign (Austro-Hungarian victory)
    - Battle of Mojkovac (Montenegrin victory)

==== World War I in Albania (1914–1918) ====
- 1914–1915 Muslim revolts in Albania (Co-belligerent conflict)
  - Peasant Revolt
  - Muslim rebellion in Krujë
- Serbian Great Retreat
- Liberation of Serbia, Albania and Montenegro (1918)

==== Partisan campaign in occupied Serbia (1915–1917/1918) ====
- Toplica Uprising (Central Powers victory)

==== Macedonian front (1915–1918) ====
- Battle of Krivolak
- Battle of Kosturino
- 1st Battle of Doiran
- Battle of Florina
- Battle of Struma
- Monastir Offensive
  - Battle of Malka Nidzhe
  - Battle of Kajmakchalan
  - 1st Battle of Cerna Bend
- 2nd Battle of Monastir
- 2nd Battle of Doiran
- 2nd Battle of Cerna Bend
- Battle of Skra-di-Legen
- Vardar Offensive
- Battle of Stepanci
  - Battle of Dobro Pole
  - 3rd Battle of Doiran
- Radomir Rebellion
- Liberation of Serbia, Albania and Montenegro (1918)

==== Greece during World War I ====
- National Schism (1914/1915–1917)
  - Capitulation of Fort Roupel (1916)
  - Italian and French occupation of Northern Epirus (1916)
  - National Defence coup d'état (1916)
  - Surrender and internment of IV Corps (1916)
  - Noemvriana (1916)
  - Battle of Katerini (? (1916 or 1917))
  - French invasiont of Thessaly (1917)
- Struma operation (1916)

=== Dissolution of Austria-Hungary (1914–1918) ===
Note: (Note: Rebellions and other incidents presaging the dissolution of the monarchy.)

- Banditry of the Green Cadres
- Cattaro mutiny
- Judenburg mutiny
- Rumburk rebellion
- Declaration of Czechoslovakia
  - Attempt to declare Czechoslovakia in Dobruška
  - Attempt to declare Czechoslovakia in Písek
  - Czechoslovak coup in Prague
  - November 1918 Czech-Hungarian clashes
- The Prešov Rebellion
- Aster Revolution
- Poland takeover of Galicia
  - Liberation of Kraków
  - Capture of Pińczów
- Allied offensive into Southern Hungary
- November Uprising (Lviv, 1918)
- Revolt in Međimurje
- Occupation of the eastern Adriatic
- Proclamation of the Republic of German Austria
- 1918 occupation of Međimurje

=== German Revolution (1918) (WW1 part) ===
- Wilhelmshaven Mutiny
- Kiel mutiny
  - Takeover of Berlin (1918)
- German Revolution in occupied Belgium
  - Skirmishes in Brussels
- Luxembourg November 1918 rebellions
- November 1918 insurgency in Alsace–Lorraine

=== Establish of independent Polish state ===
- Disarmament of German soldiers in Poland
- Coup d'état in Poland (1918)

== Middle Eastern theatre (1914–1918) ==
=== Caucasus Campaign (1914–1918) ===
1914

- Capture of Bajazet (Russian victory)
- Bergmann Offensive (Inconclusive)
- Battle of Sarikamish (Decisive Russian victory)
  - Battle of Ardahan (Russian victory)
- Battle of Cape Sarych (Russian victory)

1915

- Charpentier's Raid (Russian victory)
- Defense of Van (1915) (Russo-Armenian victory)
- Battle of Manzikert (1915) (Ottoman victory)
- Battle of Kara Killisse (Russian victory)
- Battle of Dilman (Russian victory)
- Battle of Kirpen Island (Russian victory)
- Battle of the Bosporus (Russian victory)

1916

- Erzurum Offensive (Russian victory)
- Battle of Muş (Russian victory)
- Battle of Koprukoy (Russian victory)
- Trebizond Campaign (Russian victory)
  - Lazistan offensive (Russian victory)
    - Landing in Riza (Russian victory)
- Battle of Çapakçur (Ottoman victory)
- Battle of Erzincan (Russian victory)
- Battle of Bitlis (Russian victory)
- Battle of Kop Mount (Russian victory)

1917

- Senenj-Kermanshah offensive (Russian victory)

1918

- Capture of Trabzon (1918) (Ottoman victory)
- Battle of Ushno (Assyrian victory)
- Battle of Mastara (Armenian victory)
- Battle of Abaran (Armenian victory)
- Battle of Sardarabad (Armenian victory)
- Armenian–Azerbaijani war (1918–1920)
  - Battle of Sardarabad (Decisive Armenian victory)
  - Battle of Bash Abaran (Armenian victory)
  - Battle of Karakilisa (Ottoman victory)
  - Battle of Goychay (Ottoman-Azerbaijani victory)
  - Battle of Kurdamir (Ottoman-Azerbaijani victory)
  - Battle of Baku (Ottoman-Azerbaijani victory)
    - Battle of Binagadi (Ottoman-Azerbaijani victory)
- German Caucasus expedition (1918) (Ottoman-German withdrew)
- Battle of Choloki (1918) (Transcaucasian victory)
- Bicheharov offensive in Dagestan (White Russian victory)
  - First siege of Petrovsk (Russian victory)
- Izzet Pasha's offensive in Dagestan (Ottoman victory)
- Dagestan Campaign (1918) (The Biceharists successfully counteract the Turks, but are forced to temporarily leave Dagestan; Ottoman output from Dagestan)
  - Battle of Tarkin heights (Key Russian victory; Ottomans failure to capture Petrovsk)
  - Battle of Mammadkali (Key Russian victory; The Biceharists maintain the unity of the Army, the Turks temporarily retreat)
  - Second siege of Petrovsk (Ottoman victory)

=== Gallipoli Campaign (1915–1916) ===
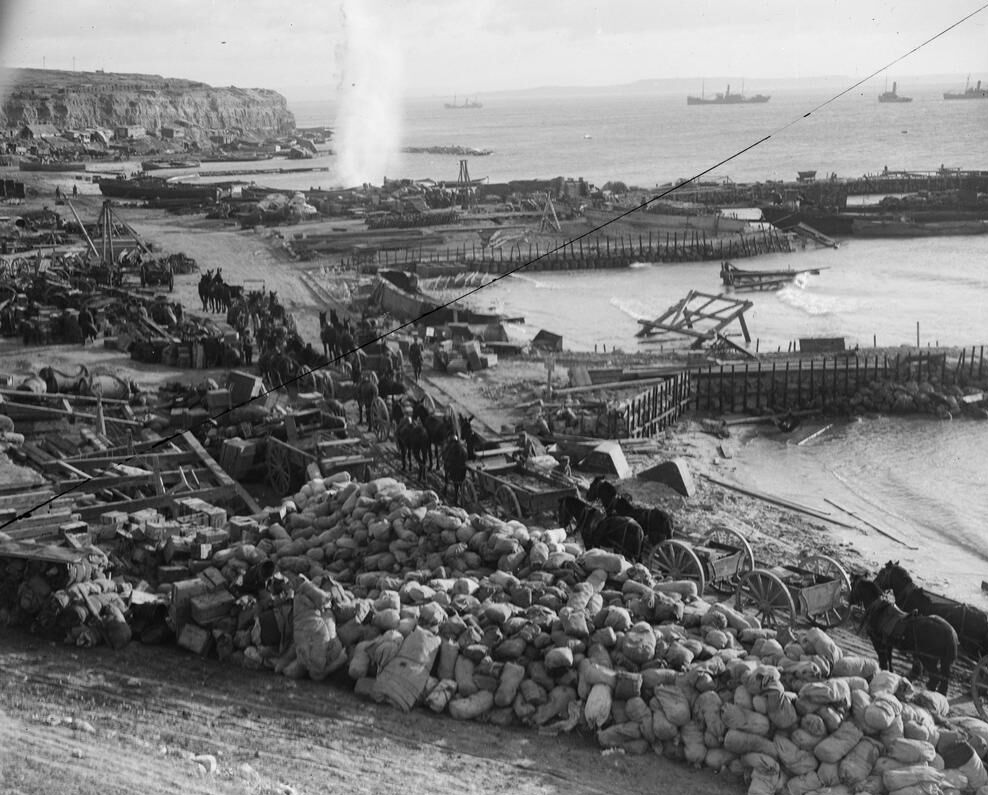
W Beach, Helles, on January 7, 1916, just prior to the final evacuation of British forces during the Gallipoli Campaign.

The Gallipoli Campaign (also called the "Dardanelles Campaign"), was a number of battles fought between 1915 and 1916.

- Naval operations in the Dardanelles Campaign (Central Powers victory)
- Battle of Kumkale (Ottoman victory)
  - Landing at Anzac Cove (Allied victory)
  - Second attack on Anzac Cove (Allied victory)
  - Third attack on Anzac Cove (Allied victory)
  - Landing at Cape Helles (Central Powers victory)
- First Battle of Krithia (Central Powers victory)
- Second Battle of Krithia (Central Powers victory)
- Third Battle of Krithia (Central Powers victory)
- Battle of Gully Ravine (Allied victory)
- Battle for Baby 700 (Ottoman victory)
- Battle of Sari Bair (Central Powers victory)
- Battle for No.3 Post (Ottoman victory)
  - Landing at Suvla Bay (Ottoman victory)
- Battle of Krithia Vineyard (Central Powers victory)
- Battle of Lone Pine (Allied victory)
- Battle of the Nek (Central Powers victory)
- Battle of Chunuk Bair (Central Powers victory)
- Battle of Hill 60 (Gallipoli) (Central Powers victory)
- Battle of Scimitar Hill (Central Powers victory)

=== Sinai and Palestine Campaign (1915–1918) ===
- First Suez Offensive (1915)
- Battle of El Tor (1915)
- Battle of Romani or "The Second Suez Offensive" (1916)
- Battle of Bir el Abd (1916)
- Battle of Magdhaba (1916)
- Battle of Rafa (1917)
- Raid on Bir el Hassana (1917)
- Raid on Nekhl (1917)
- First Battle of Gaza (1917)
- Stalemate in Southern Palestine (1917)
  - Second Battle of Gaza
  - Raid on the Beersheba to Hafir el Auja railway
  - Battle of Beersheba (British Empire victory, the end of the stalemate)
- Battle of Tel el Khuweilfe (1917)
- Third Battle of Gaza (1917)
- Battle of Hareira and Sheria (1917)
- Charge at Sheria (1917)
- Capture of Wadi el Hesi (1917)
- Battle of Mughar Ridge (1917)
- Battle of Ayun Kara (1917)
- Battle of Jerusalem (1917)
- Battle of Nebi Samwil (1917)
- Battle of Jaffa (1917)
- Battle of El Burj (1917)
- British occupation of the Jordan Valley (1918)
- Battle of Tell 'Asur (1918)
- First Battle of the Jordan (1918)
  - Battle of Hijla
  - First Battle of Amman
- Second Battle of the Jordan (1918)
- Action of Arsuf (1918)
- Battle of Abu Tellul (1918)
- Battle of Megiddo (1918)
  - Battle of Sharon
    - Battle of Tulkarm
    - Battle of Tabsor
    - Battle of Arara
    - Battle of Nazareth
    - Capture of Afulah and Beisan
    - Capture of Jenin
    - Battle of Haifa
    - Battle of Samakh
    - Capture of Tiberias
  - Battle of Nablus
- Third Transjordan attack (1918)
  - Capture of Jisr ed Damieh
  - Second Battle of Amman
- Fall of Damascus (1918)
- T. E. Lawrence's attack on the Ottoman army retreating from Tafas (1918)
- Pursuit to Haritan (1918)
- Battle of Aleppo (1918)
- Charge at Haritan (1918)

=== Mesopotamian Campaign (1914–1918) ===
- Fao Landing (British victory)
- Battle of Basra (British victory)
- Battle of Qurna (British victory)
- Battle of Shaiba (British victory)
- Battle of Amara (British victory)
- 1915 uprising in Karbala (Rebel victory)
- Battle of Nasiriyah (British victory)
- Battle of Es Sinn (British victory)
- Capture of Al-Aziziyah (British victory)
- Capture of Zeur (British victory)
- Battle of Ctesiphon (Inconclusive)
- Charge at El Kutunie (British victory)
- Battle of Umm-at-Tubal (British victory)
- Siege of Kut (Ottoman victory)
  - Battle of Sheikh Sa'ad (British victory)
  - Battle of the Wadi (Ottoman victory)
  - Battle of Hanna (Ottoman victory)
  - Battle of Dujaila (Ottoman victory)
- Kerind-Kasreshirin operation (Russian victory)
- Khanaqin-Hamadan operation (Ottoman victory)
  - Battle of Khanaqin (Ottoman victory)
- 1916 uprising in Hilla (Ottoman victory)
- Mosul operation (Ottoman victory)
- Second Battle of Kut (British victory)
- Battle of Bughaila (British victory)
- Fall of Baghdad (British victory)
- Samarra offensive (British victory)
  - Battle of Mushahida (British victory)
  - Capture of Fallujah (British victory)
  - Battle of Jebel Hamlin (Ottoman victory)
  - Affair of Duqma (British victory)
  - Battle of Istabulat (British victory)
- First Battle of Ramadi (Ottoman victory)
- Second Battle of Ramadi (British victory)
- Capture of Al-Auja (British victory)
- Battle of Tikrit (British victory)
- Action of Khan Baghdadi (British victory)
- Battle of Sharqat (British victory)

=== Arab Revolt (1916–1919) ===
- Battle of Mecca (1916) (Arab victory)
- Siege of Medina (1916–1919) (Hejaz victory)
- Battle of Aqaba (1917) (Arab victory)

=== Persian Campaign (1914–1918) ===
- Swedish intervention in Persia (1911–1916) (Indecisive, eventually a Persian-Swedish victory)
  - Chiraz expedition (1913 –1915) (Persian-Swedish victory)
  - Boroudjerd expedition
- Occupations of Tabriz (1914–1918)
  - Russian occupation of Tabriz (1909–1915, 1915–1918)
  - First ottoman occupation of Tabriz (1915)
  - Second ottoman occupation of Tabriz (1918)
- Battle of Dilman (1915) (Allied victory)
- British occupations of Bushehr (1838, 1856, 1915) (Allied victory)
  - Third British occupation of Bushehr (1915) (Allied victory)
- Jungle Movement of Gilan (1915–1920)
- Battle of Robat Karim (1915) (Allied tactical victory, Persian strategic victory)
- Battle of Musalla
- Battle of Qar-i Shirin
- Battle of Qom
- Kermanshah operation (1916) (Allied victory)
- Hakkari Expedition (1916) (Allied victory)
- Battle of Hamadan
- Battle of Seray Mountain (1917) (Allied victory)
- Hakkari Expedition (1917)
- Urmia revolt (1918) (Decisive Allied victory)
- Battle of Charah (1918) (Allied victory)
- Battle of Suldouze (1918) (Allied victory)
- Second battle of Urmia (1918)
- Third battle of Urmia (1918)
- Battle of Sauj Bulak
- Battle of Slamas the first
- Battle of Slamas the second
- Battle of Derbend

=== South Arabia (1914–1919) ===
- Invasion of Cheikh Said
- Attack on Perim
- Battle of Ad-Dakim
- Battle of Sheikh Othman
- Ahmad bin Yahya revolt
- Raid on Salif

=== Second Saudi-Rashidi War (1915–1918) ===
- Battle of Jarrab (1915)
- Ha'il offensive into Qasim
- Emirate Ha'il raids against Kuwait
- Revolt of Ajman tribe
  - Battle of Kanzan (1915)
- British offensive to Jabal Shammar [ru] (1918)
  - Battle of Yateb
  - Battle of Ha'il (1918)

=== Other military engagements ===
- Kurdish rebellions during World War I (1914–1918)
  - Dersim uprising of 1916
  - Establish of Kurdish state (1918–1919)
- Armenian resistance during the Armenian genocide (Note: Only engagements outside of military fronts) (1914–1918)
  - Zeitun resistance (1914) (Armenian victory)
  - Sasun Resistance (1915) (Ottoman victory)
  - Defense of Azakh also known as the Midyat Rebellion (Assyrian-Armenian victory)
    - Defence of Iwardo (Assyrian victory)
  - Urfa resistance
  - Musa Dagh defense (Armenian victory)
  - Zeitun resistance (1915) (Ottoman victory)
  - Shabin-Karahisar uprising (Ottoman victory)
- Sayfo military actions
  - Ottoman-Kurdish invasion of Hakkari highlands (1915–?)
  - Defense of Azakh also known as the Midyat Rebellion (1915) (Assyrian-Armenian victory)
    - Defence of Iwardo (Assyrian victory)
  - Hakkari Expedition (1916) (Allied victory)
- Evacuation of the Ottoman garrison in Qatar (British victory)
- British attack on Ajmí as-Sadun in Anaza (Al-Muntafiq victory)

== African theatre of World War I (1914–1918) ==
=== East African campaign (1914–1918) (Allied victory) ===
- Maziua raid
- Battle of Tanga or Battle of the Bees
- Battle of Rufiji Delta
- Battle of Kilimanjaro
- Battle of Kidodi
- Battle of Bukoba
- Battle of Utete
- Battle of Njinjo
- Battle of Jassin
- Battle of Salaita Hill
- Battle of Kahe
- Battle of Latema Nek
- Battle of Lukigura
- Battle of Mlali
- Battle of Wami
- Battle of Kisaki
- Battle of Kondoa Irangi
- Battle of Lukigura
- Battle of Dutumi
- Battle of Matamondo
- Battle of Kibata
- Battle of Narungombe
- Battle of Kimbaramba
- Battle of Morogoro
- Battle of Mkalamo
- Battle of Behobeho
- Battle of Nambanje
- Battle of Rumbo
- Battle of Ngomano
- Battle of Mahiwa
- Battle of Namacurra
- Battle of Lioma

=== Kamerun campaign (1914–1916) (Allied victory) ===
- Battle of Tepe (British victory)
- Battle of Kusseri (French victory)
- Battle of Lai (German victory)
- Siege of Mora (Allied victory)
- Battle of Nsanakong (German victory)
- Battle of Ukoko (Allied victory)
- First Battle of Edea (Allied victory)
- Second Battle of Edea (French victory)
- Battle of Jabassi (British victory)
- First Battle of Garua (German victory)
- Second Battle of Garua (Allied victory)
- Battle of Ngaundere (Allied victory)
- First Battle of Jaunde (German victory)
- Second Battle of Jaunde (Allied victory)
- Battle of Gurin (British victory)
- Battle of Banjo (British victory)

=== Togoland campaign (1914) ===
- Battle of Bafilo (German victory)
- Affair of Agbeluvoe (Allied victory)
- Battle of Chra (Allied victory)

=== South West Africa campaign (1914–1915/1917) ===
- Battle of Sandfontein
- Maritz rebellion
  - Battle of Mushroom Valley
- German campaign in Angola
  - Naulila Incident
  - Attack on Naulila
- Ovambo Uprising
- Battle of Kakamas
- South Africa invasion to German South-West Africa
  - Battle of Trekkopjes
  - Battle of Otavi

=== Operations in North africa (1914–1918 (as part of WW1)) (Allied victory) ===
- French conquest of Morocco (1914–1918 (as part of WW1)) (Co-belligerent conflict)
  - Zaian War (1914–1921)
    - Battle of El Herri (1914)
- Senussi Campaign (1915–1916)
  - Senussi order Invasion of Tunisia
  - Coastal campaign (1915–1916)
    - Action of Agagia (1916)
  - Band of Oases campaign (1916–1917)

== Asia-Pacific theatre (1914–1919) ==
- Siege of Tsingtao (1914)
- Occupation of German Samoa (1914)
- Japan occupation of Shandong Peninsula(1914–?)

=== Allied occupation of German New Guinea (1914) ===
- Occupation of Nauru (Australian victory)
- Battle of Bita Paka (Australian victory)
- Siege of Toma (Australian victory)
- Japanese occupation of German colonial possessions (Japanese victory)

=== Resistance in occupied German New Guinea ===
Note: (Note: Note: Herman Detzner's group was not the only one that refused to surrender after the conquest of the colony. However, by 1915, all such groups had been liquidated.)

=== North-West Frontier Theatre (1914–1917) ===
- Operations in the Tochi (1914–1917)
- Operations against the Mohmands, Bunerwals and Swatis (1915)
- Kalat Operations (1915-16)
- Mohmand blockade (1916–1917)
- Operations against the Mahsuds (1917)
- Operations against the Marri and Khetran tribes (1918)

=== Next ===
- Kelentan Rebellion (1915)

=== Central Asian revolt of 1916 ===
- Semirechye revolt of 1916
  - Karkarinsky uprising of 1916
- Jizzakh uprising
- Kostanay revolt
- Akmola revolt
- Turgai uprising (1916–1917)
  - Siege of Turgai (1916)
  - Dogal battle

=== Basmachi movement (1916–1918(as part of WW1)-1934) ===
- Khivan Revolution
- Kolesov's Campaign

=== Chinese entry into World War I (1917) ===
- Termination of the German and Austro-Hungarian Legations (China victory)
- Chinese occupation of Austro-Hungarian Tientsin (China victory)
- Chinese occupation of German Hankou (China victory)

== Naval engagements (1914–1918) ==
=== U-boat campaign ===
- Atlantic U-boat campaign of World War I (1914–1918)
  - Sinking of the RMS Lusitania (1915)
  - Baralong incidents (1915)
    - Action of 19 August 1915
    - Action of 24 September 1915
  - Attack on SS Gulflight (1916)
  - United States Navy operations during World War I
    - Action of 15 October 1917
    - Attack on Orleans (1918)
- Mediterranean U-boat campaign of World War I
  - Ancona incident (1915)
  - United States Navy operations during World War I
    - Action of 8 May 1918

=== Atlantic Theatre ===
- Blockade of Germany (1914–1919)
- Naval operations of the Kamerun campaign (1914)
  - Battle of Ukoko (1914)
- First Battle of Heligoland Bight (1914)
- Sinking of the SMS Cap Trafalgar (1914)
- Battle of the Falkland Islands (1914)
- Raid on Scarborough, Hartlepool and Whitby (1914)
- Battle of Dogger Bank (1915)
- Battle of Jutland (1916)
- United States Navy operations during World War I (1917–1918)
- Action of 10 March 1917
- Battle of Dover Strait (1917) (British victory)
- Action of 4 May 1917
- Second Battle of Heligoland Bight (1917) (Indecisive)
- Action of 15 October 1917
- Action of 17 November 1917
- German bombing of Monrovia (1918) (indecisive)
- Zeebrugge Raid (1918)
- North Sea Mine Barrage (1918)
- Action of 14 October 1918

=== Mediterranean ===
- Adriatic Campaign of World War I
  - Battle of Antivari
  - First bombardment of mount Lovćen
  - Second bombardment of mount Lovćen
  - Otranto Barrage (1915–1918)
  - Action of 8 June 1915
  - Bombardment of Ancona
  - Battle of Durazzo (1915)
  - Third bombardment of mount Lovćen (1916)
  - Battle of the Otranto Straits (1917)
  - Battle of Durazzo (1918)
  - Raid on Pula (1918)
  - Bakar mockery
  - Allied occupation of the eastern Adriatic (1918)
- Pursuit of Goeben and Breslau (1914)
- Naval operations in the Dardanelles Campaign (1915–1916)
  - Landing at Anzac Cove (1915)
  - Landing at Cape Helles (1915)
- Blockade of the Eastern Mediterranean (1915 – 1918)
- United States Navy operations during World War I (1917–1918)
  - Second battle of Durazzo (1918)
- Battle of Imbros (1918)

=== Asia-Pacific Theatre ===
- Battle of Rabaul
- Battle of Tsingtao (1914)
- Battle of Penang (1914)
- SMS Geier Incident (1914)
- Bombardment of Papeete (1914)
- Bombardment of Madras (1914)
- Battle of Coronel (1914)
- Battle of Cocos (1914)
- Japanese Occupation Of German Pacific Colonial Possessions (1914)
- Battle of Más a Tierra (1915)
- United States Navy operations during World War I (1917–1918)
  - Scuttling of SMS Cormoran (1917)

=== Baltic sea ===
- Battle of the Gulf of Riga (1915)
- Battle of Åland Islands (1915)
- Battle of Gotland (1915)
- Landing at Cape Domesnes (1915)
- Operation Albion (1917)
- Raid on Ruhnu (1917)
- Battle of Moon Sound (1917)
- Operation Albion (1917)
- Ice Cruise of the Baltic Fleet (1918)
- Operation Schlußstein (1918)

=== Black Sea ===
- Black Sea raid
- Battle of Cape Sarych
- Battle of the Bosporus
- Battle of Kirpen Island
- Action of 8 January 1916
- Airstrike on Zonguldak
- Romanian Black Sea Fleet during World War I

=== West Indian Ocean ===
- Battle of Zanzibar (1914)
- Battle of Rufiji Delta (1914–1915)

=== Naval engagements on rivers and lakes ===
- Bombardment of Belgrade (1914)
- Lake Victoria campaign
- First Battle of Cobadin
- Battle for Lake Tanganyika (1915–1916)

== Air engagements (1914–1918) ==
World War I was the first war to see major use of planes for offensive, defensive and reconnaissance operations, and both the Entente Powers and the Central Powers used planes extensively. Almost as soon as they were invented, planes were drafted for military service.

Battles:

- Aerial combat of 5 October 1914
- Strategic bombing during World War I (1914–1918)
  - German bombing of Paris during First World War
  - German bombing of Britain (1914–1918)
    - Bombing of London during the First World War
      - Operation Turk's Cross (1916)
        - Folkestone raid (1917)
      - Harvest moon offensive (1917)
      - Arrival of the Giants (1917)
      - Fire plan (1917)
      - Folkestone raid (1917)
      - Whitsun Raid (1918)
    - Tipton Zeppelin raid (1916)
  - Bombing of Warsaw in World War I
  - Tondern raid (1918)
- Raid on Cuxhaven (1914)
- Battle of Dogger Bank (1915) (one Zeppelin included)
- Action of 8 June 1915
- First victory using a synchronized gun (1915)
- Airstrike on Zonguldak (1916)
- Action of 4 May 1917
- Battle of Arras (1917)
  - Bloody April (1917)
- Air Battle on Istrana (1917)
- Flight over Vienna (1918)

See also the following articles:

- Aviation history (1914–1918)
  - 1914 in aviation
  - 1915 in aviation
  - 1916 in aviation
  - 1917 in aviation
  - 1918 in aviation
- Flying aces
- List of World War I flying aces
- Strategic bombing during World War I
- Zeppelins in World War I

== Other military engagements ==
- Mexican Border War (1910–1919)
  - Battle of Ambos Nogales (1918)
- Battle of Broken Hill (1915)
- Battle of Balasore (1915)
- Allied occupation of Aegean Islands (1915–1918)
  - French capture of Kastellorizo
  - Allied occupation of Tenedos
  - British Occupation of Chios

== Strikes, demonstrations, civil unrest and similar events ==
Due to the huge number of such events, only the most important ones or those that have their own article or section within the article should be listed.

=== Austria-Hungary ===
- Austro-Hungarian strike of January 1918
- Hunger storm in Plzeň
- General strike of 14 October 1918

=== German Empire ===
- SMS Prinzregent Luitpold crew hunger strike
- German strike of January 1918

== Massacres ==
=== List ===
- Destruction of Kalisz (by German Empire)
- Rape of Belgium (by German Empire)
  - Massacre of Tamines
  - Dinant massacre
  - Sack of Louvain
  - Arlon massacre
- Lwów pogrom (1914) (by Russian Empire)
- Assyrian genocide also known as Sayfo (by Ottoman Empire)
- Tafas massacre (by Ottoman Empire)
- Surafend massacre (by British Empire)

== Co-belligerent conflicts ==
These conflicts are considered part of the First World War because one or more of the combatants were aligned with a main belligerent power which may have provided materiel, military, financial, or political support.

=== Pre-First World War ===
- Mexican Revolution (1910–1920)
- Italo-Turkish War (1911–1912)
- First Balkan War (1912–13)
- Second Balkan War (1913)
- Muscat rebellion (1913–20)
- French conquest of Morocco (1907–1934)
  - Zaian War (1914–21)
- Kurdish rebellions during World War I (1914–17)
- 1914–1915 Muslim revolts in Albania

=== During the First World War ===
(Some are already mentioned above in the article)

- Maritz Rebellion (1914–15)
- United States occupation of Veracruz (1914)
  - Ypiranga incident (1914)
- United States occupation of Haiti (1915–1934)
- Easter Rising (1916)
- Warlord Era (1916–1928)
  - National Protection War (1915–1916)
  - Manchu restoration (1917)
- Palace Coup against Lij Iyasu (1916–1921) (Zewditu victory)
  - Battle of Segale (1916) (Zewditu victory)
- Russian Revolution (1917) (only parts related with World war I)
  - February revolution (1917)
  - July days (1917)
  - October Revolution (1917)
  - Russian Civil War (1917–22)
    - Ukrainian War of Independence (1917–1921)
      - Anti-Hetman Uprising
      - Soviet westward offensive of 1918–1919
    - Central Powers intervention in the Russian Civil War (1918–1920)
    - Allied intervention in the Russian Civil War (1918–1925)
      - North Russia Campaign (1918–1919)
- 1917 French Army mutinies
- Finnish Civil War (1918) (for battles see eastern front)
- Romanian military intervention in Bessarabia (1918)

=== Post-First World War ===
- German revolution of 1918–1919 (post ww1 part)
- Russian Civil War (only parts related with World war I)
  - Estonian War of Independence (1918–1920)
    - Soviet westward offensive of 1918–1919
  - Latvian War of Independence (1918–1920)
    - Soviet westward offensive of 1918–1919
  - Lithuanian Wars of Independence (1918–1920)
    - Soviet westward offensive of 1918–1919
    - Lithuanian–Bermontian War
- Czechoslovak occupation of the Sudeteland (1918–1919)
- Greater Poland Uprising (1918–19)
- Hungarian-Romanian War (1918–19)
- Polish-Soviet War (1919–21)
- Irish War of Independence (1919–21)
- Turkish War of Independence (1919–23)
- Greco-Turkish War (1919–22)
- Scuttling of the German fleet at Scapa Flow (1919) (Note: The victims of the incident are sometimes described as the last casualties of the First World War (actually the last casualty of the war was probably the American Henry Gunther))
- Vlora War (1920)
- Irish Civil War (1922–23)

== Sources ==
- James M. McPherson; Stephen B. Oates; Celab Carr; Geoffrey Ward; Richard M. Ketchum; et al. (2001). Robert Cowley; Geoffrey Parker (eds.). A Reader's Companion to Military History (Paperback ed.). Houghton Mifflin Company. ISBN 0-618-12742-9.
- Олейников, Алексей (2016). Россия-щит Антанты. С предисловием Николая Старикова. St. Petersburg: Питер. ISBN 978-5-496-01795-4.
- Брусилов, Алексей (2023). Мои воспоминания. Из царской армии в Красную. Moscow: Москва. ISBN 978-5-04-176827-0.
