= Bombing of Warsaw =

Bombing of Warsaw may refer to:

- Bombing of Warsaw in World War I
- Bombing of Warsaw in World War II
