= Second Battle of Jaunde =

Coordinates: 03°52′N 11°31′E

- Part of the Kamerun campaign in World War I
| Date | 9 October 1915 – 1 January 1916 |
| Location | Area around Jaunde, German Kamerun |
| Result | Allied occupation of Jaunde |

Belligerents
| (United Kingdom of Great Britain and Ireland) British Empire: British Nigeria; France: (French Third Republic) French Equatorial Africa | (German Empire) Germany: German Kamerun |

Commanders and leaders
| (United Kingdom) Gen. Charles Dobell | Unknown |

Strength
| 8,000 | Unknown |

Casualties and losses
| Unknown | Unknown |

The Second Battle of Jaunde involved the successful British and French assault on the German capital of Jaunde during the Kamerun campaign of the First World War. After the failure of the First Battle of Jaunde during the summer of 1915, the bulk of Allied forces had retreated to the Kele river. Following the Second Duala Conference where Allied commanders discussed the situation, it was decided that another assault should be attempted. Although the columns surrounding Jaunde were not in effective communication with one another, on 1 January 1916, British forces under Colonel Georges occupied the capital. By this time it had been abandoned by the German troops who had fled to the neutral Spanish colony of Río Muni. This Allied victory signaled the end of German resistance in Kamerun apart from the Siege of Mora which would continue for another few months.
