= Cocobeach =

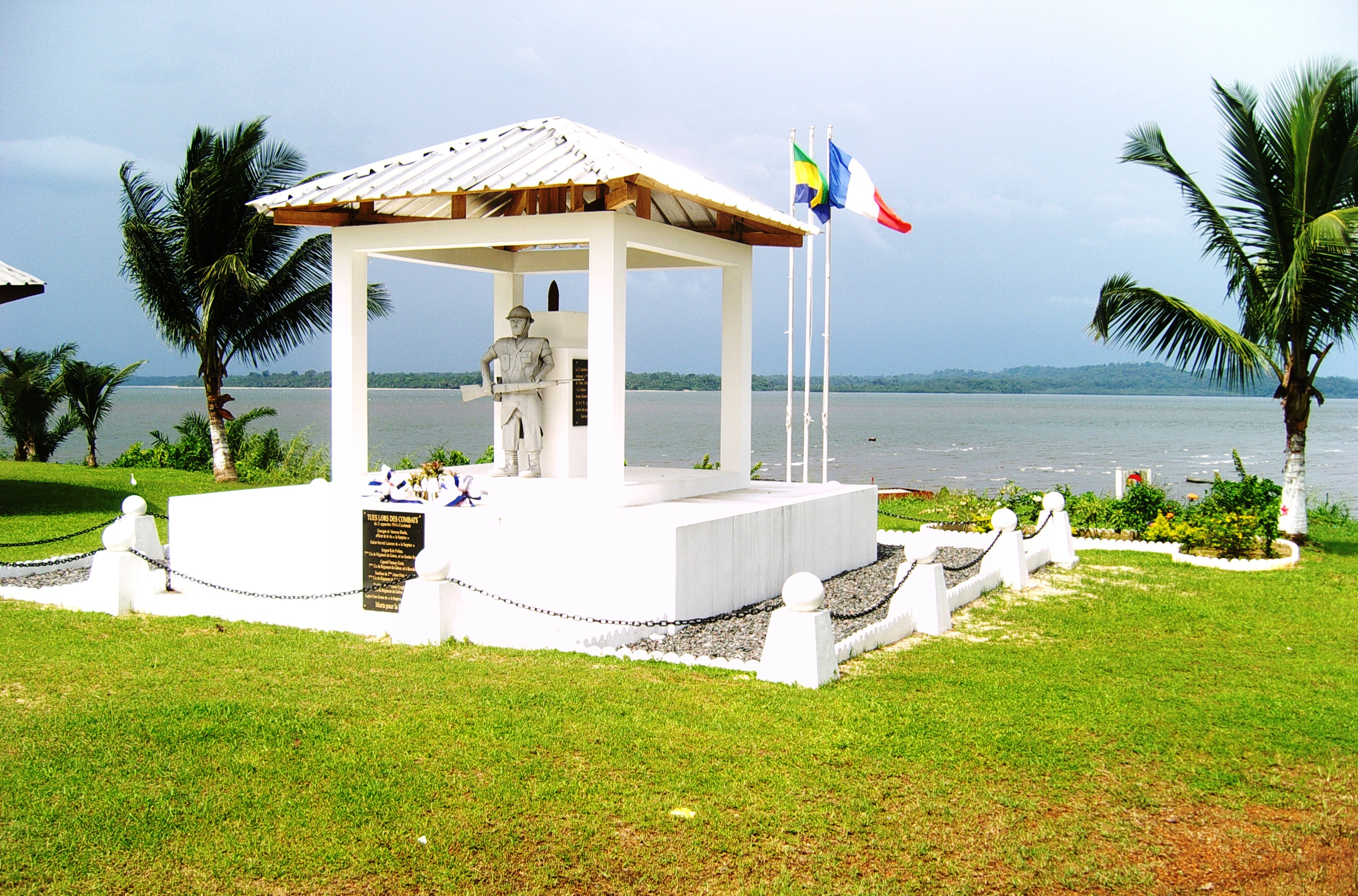
- Memorial commemorating the Battle of Ukoko

- Coat of arms

- Location in Gabon
- Coordinates: 0°59′N 9°34′E
- Country: Gabon
- Province: Estuaire
- Department: Noya

Population (1993)
  - Total: 1,200

Cocobeach is a town in northwestern Gabon, lying on the south bank of the Muni River. It is the capital of the Noya Department. It has a beach and is the main border town for Equatorial Guinea, ferries sailing to Cogo across the river and the border.

The town is very small, containing just a fishing village, a small market and a number of adjacent beaches. It is one of the major travel destinations in the region owing to the Crystal Mountains inland from the town, which contain some of the oldest rainforests in Gabon. These were able to largely escape the drying effect of glacial periods of the Quaternary due to the persistent fog from the Benguela Current providing moisture during the dry season.

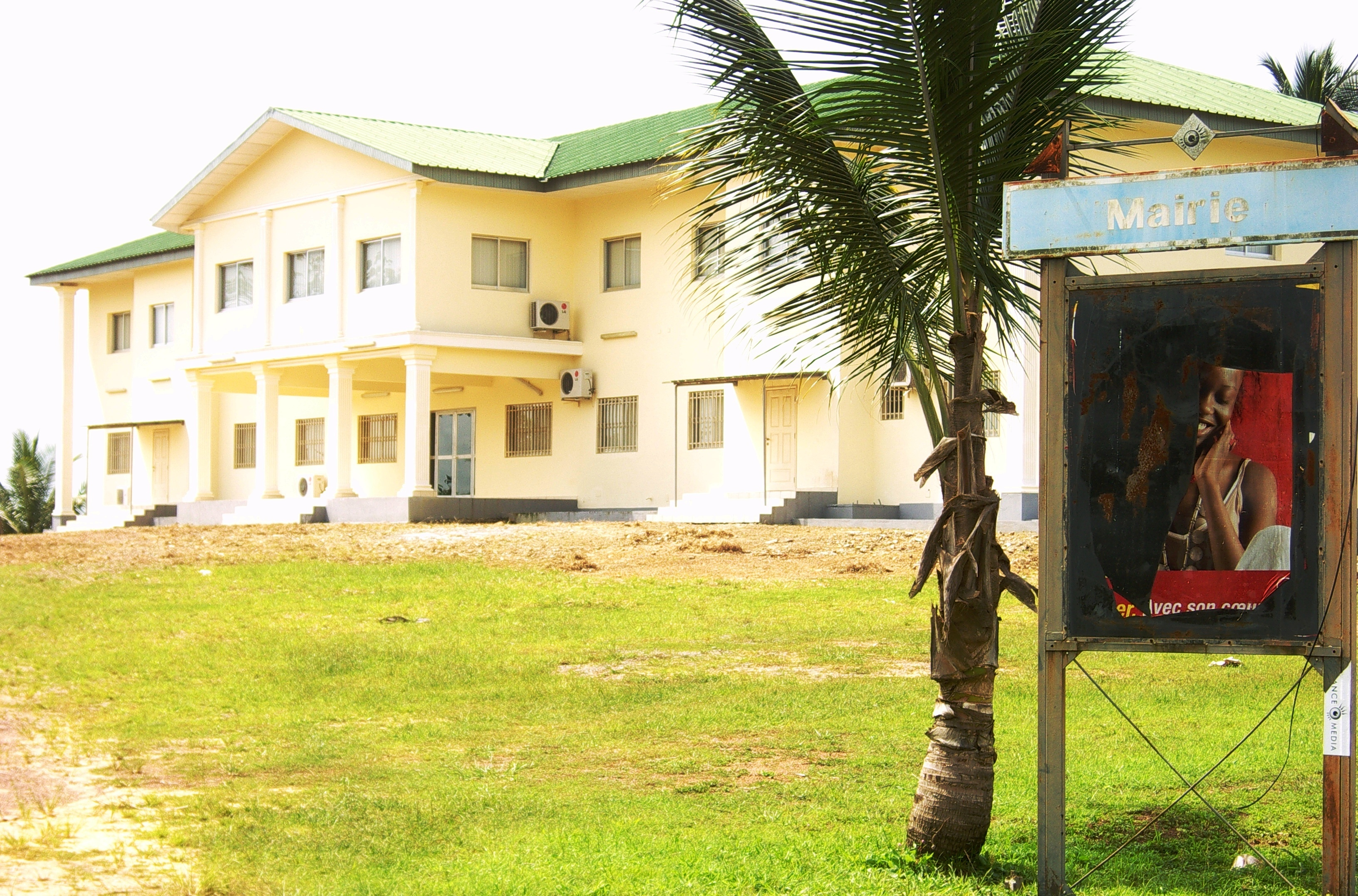
City hall

== Climate ==
Like a good portion of Gabon, Cocobeach has a tropical monsoon climate (Köppen Am) with a long wet season from September or October to May and a short dry season due to the cold, foggy Beneguela current during the southern hemisphere winter.

Compared to more southerly parts of Gabon, Cocobeach is somewhat wetter, with around ten to fifteen percent more rainfall than Libreville and a dry season usually several weeks shorter. Although no reliable climate data exist, it is often thought that annual rainfall further north may reach as high as 4,500 millimetres (180 in).

Climate data for Cocobeach, Gabon (1961–1990, extremes 1946–present)
Month	Jan	Feb	Mar	Apr	May	Jun	Jul	Aug	Sep	Oct	Nov	Dec	Year
Record high °C (°F)	34.4 (93.9)	36.5 (97.7)	34.4 (93.9)	34.3 (93.7)	34.0 (93.2)	33.5 (92.3)	36.0 (96.8)	33.0 (91.4)	32.5 (90.5)	32.5 (90.5)	33.2 (91.8)	36.2 (97.2)	36.5 (97.7)
Mean daily maximum °C (°F)	30.1 (86.2)	30.4 (86.7)	30.9 (87.6)	30.7 (87.3)	30.2 (86.4)	28.6 (83.5)	27.7 (81.9)	27.7 (81.9)	29.2 (84.6)	28.5 (83.3)	29.1 (84.4)	29.4 (84.9)	29.4 (84.9)
Daily mean °C (°F)	26.7 (80.1)	26.9 (80.4)	27.1 (80.8)	26.9 (80.4)	26.7 (80.1)	25.6 (78.1)	24.5 (76.1)	24.7 (76.5)	25.8 (78.4)	25.5 (77.9)	25.9 (78.6)	26.2 (79.2)	26.0 (78.8)
Mean daily minimum °C (°F)	23.2 (73.8)	23.3 (73.9)	23.2 (73.8)	23.1 (73.6)	23.1 (73.6)	22.5 (72.5)	21.2 (70.2)	21.6 (70.9)	22.4 (72.3)	22.5 (72.5)	22.6 (72.7)	23.0 (73.4)	22.6 (72.7)
Record low °C (°F)	17.8 (64.0)	18.8 (65.8)	19.6 (67.3)	18.6 (65.5)	19.0 (66.2)	17.0 (62.6)	15.6 (60.1)	16.6 (61.9)	19.0 (66.2)	18.4 (65.1)	19.8 (67.6)	19.8 (67.6)	15.6 (60.1)
Average rainfall mm (inches)	215.8 (8.50)	218.1 (8.59)	274.7 (10.81)	290.7 (11.44)	346.7 (13.65)	68.3 (2.69)	14.5 (0.57)	36.7 (1.44)	248.7 (9.79)	680.7 (26.80)	456.5 (17.97)	274.6 (10.81)	3,126 (123.07)
Average rainy days	15.5	13.3	17.1	18.6	18.2	7.0	3.4	9.0	19.2	21.5	21.3	16.2	180.3
Average relative humidity (%)	85	85	85	85	86	85	83	84	86	88	88	85	85
Source 1: NOAA
Source 2: Meteo Climat (record highs and lows)

== See also ==
- Battle of Ukoko
