= Noya (department) =

Coordinates: 0°59′N 9°34′E

- Department
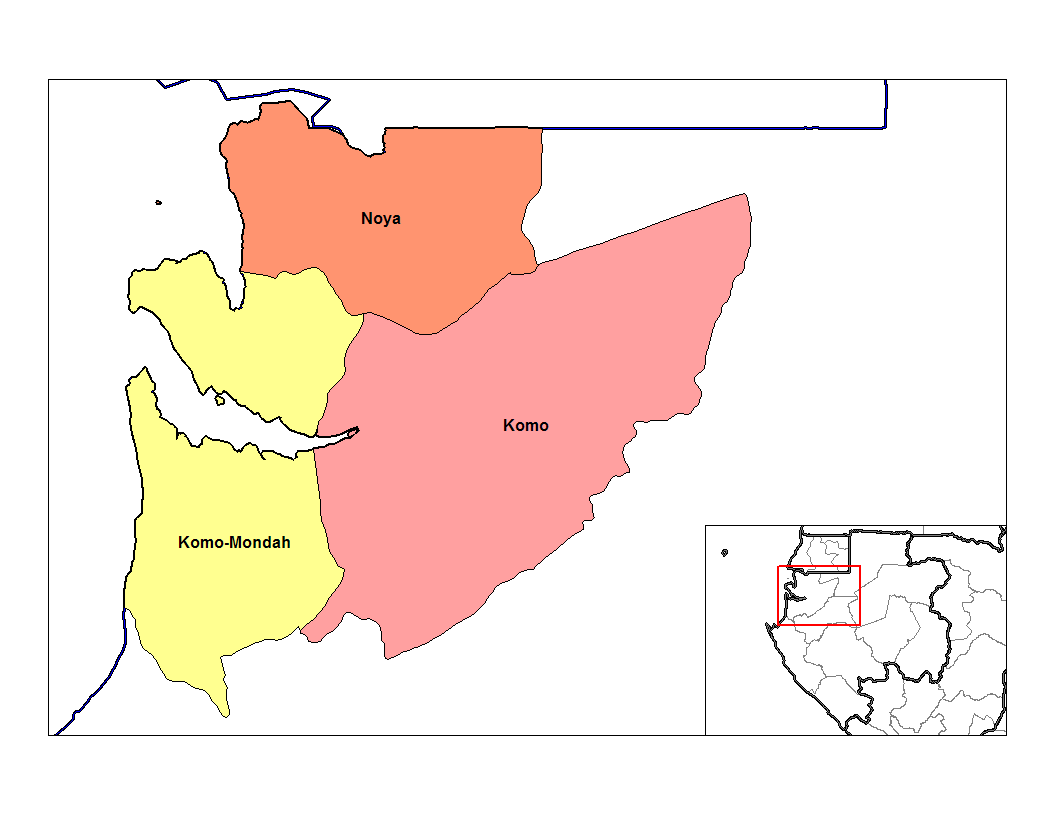
- Noya Department in the region
- Country: Gabon
- Province: Estuaire Province

Population (2013 Census)
  - Total: 4,225
- Time zone: UTC+1 (GMT +1)

Noya is a department of Estuaire Province in western Gabon. The capital lies at Cocobeach. It had a population of 4,225 in 2013.

== Towns and villages ==
The village Milembié is at 40 km to Cocobeach when coming from Libreville.
