= Battle of Matamondo =

- Part of East African Campaign
Date	10-11 August 1916
Location	Nguru Mountains, German East Africa 6°7′26″S 37°34′34″E
Result	German victory

Belligerents
German Empire: German East Africa	British Empire: United Kingdom

Strength
3000	4 brigades

Casualties and losses
4 killed 7 wounded	60 killed and wounded 4 captured
- Location within Tanzania Battle of Matamondo (Africa)

The Battle of Matamondo was fought during the East African Campaign of World War I.

== The battle ==
In August 1916, the British launched an offensive to take full control of the Central Railway in German East Africa. General Van Deventer had already occupied the Central Railway from Kilimatinde to Dodoma and Belgian troops advanced on Tabora.

But for a distance of about 45 miles, the Central Railway passes close under the Nguru and Kanga mountains. Here the Germans had positioned 12 companies or some 3,000 men with much heavy and light artillery in the mountains. General Smuts sent 4 brigades to the Nguru Mountains to surround and defeat this German force.

On 10 August, the British advance guard, the 57th Wilde's Rifles, encountered a fortified German position at the Matamondo pass. The Wild's Rifles were joined by the King's African Rifles and the 5th and 6th South African Infantry battalions. There was fierce fighting all day long, but by nightfall the German defense had not yet been breached.

The next morning, the Germans were gone. The day's gain had allowed the main force to escape the planned encirclement.
