= Mudbir al-Far'un =

Arab rebel chieftain

Tribal chief of the al-Fatlah tribe
- In office unknown – September 1918
- Preceded by: unknown
- Succeeded by: 'Mujbil al Fara'un (According to British records); Various (According to Peter Sluglett)

Personal details
- Born: 1870; Al-Meshkhab
- Died: September 1918; Ottoman Iraq
- Children: 'Abd al-Wahid Sikkar; 4 others
- Siblings: Mizhir al Fara'un 'Mujbil al Fara'un
- Tribe: al-Fatlah

Military service
- Battles/wars: 1913 Euphrates rebellion

Mudbir al-Far'un (Note: Mudbir al-Far'un is the transliteration used by Keiko Sakai in Political parties and social networks in Iraq. Other transliterations used include Mibdir al Fir’awn, Mubdir al Fir'un, Mubdir al-Faran, and simply "Madbir".) (d. 1918) was a chieftain of the al-Fatlah tribe who led a rebellion against the Ottoman Empire in 1913. British records describe him as having been "one of the best-known men on the Euphrates" in the 1910s.

== Biography ==
Over the course of his chieftaincy, Mudbir was employed by the Ottomans as an unofficial intelligence officer, and for a short time represented the Shàmìyah on the Wilayat council.

=== 1913 Euphrates rebellion ===
In 1913, Mudbir addressed a tribal gathering in Diwaniyah, lamenting Ottoman rule:

Location of Diwaniyah, the epicentre of the 1913 rebellion, within modern Iraq.

Sirs, we used to meet […] and discuss the fate of our land/country [bila-dona] in which lived our fathers and grandfathers proudly […] Sirs, God created people and chose from amongst them the Arabs, and chose from the Arabs Quraysh, and from Quraysh He chose Hashim, and He chose from Hashim our Prophet Muhammad, praise be upon him, and He made him the Prophet of Islam; that religion that He chose for this nation and [for which] He revealed the Koran in the Arabic language which is the language of your fathers and grandfathers. Therefore you are the best of nations in the world […] Yes! Why do you bow to foreign [non-Arab, Turkish] rule controlling you with you under its mercy like slaves?

— Mudbir al-Far'un, 1913 speech

Subsequently, rebels led by Mudbir clashed with Ottoman forces throughout the mid-Euphrates region of Mesopotamia. Although this rebellion ended in failure, Mudbir would continue to be the al-Fatlah chieftain.

=== World War I ===
In 1914, the Ottoman Empire called upon various chieftains to aid them in a Jihad against the British Empire. Mudbir al-Far'un was initially supportive, however, following British victories in the Mesopotamian campaign, he adopted a more neutral, if not pro-British stance.

A British report described Mudbir as follows:

Mubdir al-Faran - Shaikh of the Al-Fatlah tribe near Moroglah, 5 hours above Shinafiyah. Not unfriendly to British. (21st June 1916.)

Mudbir condemned the Ottoman massacre that followed the 1916 uprising in Hilla:

This is a statement to the Arab nation and especially the Iraqi tribes […] Oh Arab brothers who have been cultivated by race and who trace their lineages back to Qahtan [one of the ‘fathers’ of the Arabs] […] oh those of jealousy, valour; and lords of aid and courage […] let everyone who belongs to Qahtan know that this [Ottoman] state wants to wipe you off the face of the earth and to replace you with their own Turkish kind […] By God all who did nothing in the face of such deeds and who obeyed this unjust state have none of the Arabs’ zeal. Have you not read its [the state’s] newspapers? They discriminate and degrade Arabs, and here it is, overflowing with insults to the Arabs; they even call black dogs ‘Arab’.

— Mudbir al-Far'un, 1916 condemnation

=== Death and succession ===
Mudbir died in September 1918. According to British records, he was succeeded by his brother, 'Mujbil al Fara'un. 'Mujbil had an elder brother, Mizhir (born c. 1878), but he did not become head as his mental incapacity made him unsuitable for this position. British records note that Mujbil was "very useful to us immediately after the occupation" and "a fairly honest and not too intelligent man who is played upon by the astuter 'Abdul Wáhid, his nephew".

The above account of Mudbir's succession differs from that of Peter Sluglett in Britain in Iraq: Contriving King and Country (2007). In this account, Mudbir's tribal lands were divided between 5 of his children after his death, one of which was 'Abd al-Wahid Sikkar, who would later participate in the Iraqi revolt against the British and the 1935–36 Iraqi Shia revolts.

According to Ahed Al Amiri in The Role of Karbala Scholars in Confronting the British Occupation (2017), Mujbil would be "one of the prominent personalities of Al- Fatlah tribe and took part in the leadership of the Iraqi revolution in 1920". British records state Abdul Wahid was the chief of the Fatlah at the time of the 1935–36 Iraqi Shia revolts.

== Historiography ==
The speeches in this article are taken from Fariq al Mizhir al Fir’awn's 1952 book Al Haqa’iq al Nasi’a fil Thawra al Iraiya Sanat 1920 wa Nata’ijoha. However, Fanar Haddad's 2012 analysis doubts whether these speeches were accurately recorded (these were recorded decades after the events in question, and may reflect sentiments that developed later), and if so, is uncertain if speeches were sincere.
