= Battle of the Zolota Lypa =

First World War battle

- Part of Battle of Galicia of the Eastern Front in the World War I
- The battle on the Zolota and Gnyla Lypa rivers
Date	26–28 August [O.S. 13–15 August] 1914
Location	Zolota Lypa, Austria-Hungary (modern day Ukraine)
Result	Russian victory

Belligerents
Austria-Hungary	Russian Empire

Commanders and leaders
(Austria-Hungary) Rudolf von Brudermann	Nikolai Ruzsky

Units involved
(Austria-Hungary) 3rd Army	3rd Army

Strength
160,000 men 482 guns	215,000 men 685 guns

Casualties and losses
Heavy	Heavy, but less than the Austrian Army.

Battle of the Zolota Lypa (Russian: Сражение на Золотой Липе) was a meeting engagement between the Russian 3rd and Austro-Hungarian 3rd armies, the cadre troops of both armies met, so the battle was very tense, both sides tried to carry out mutual flanking maneuver.

However, the battle soon ended, the Russians were successfully able to defeat the Austrian XI Corps on the Bug, which forced the entire army to stand on the defensive, and then retreat.

The primary reason for the failure of the Austro-Hungarian troops was their decision to launch offensive operations against an enemy force nearly twice their size.

== Aftermath ==
The battle ended with the retreat of the Austro-Hungarian troops, both sides suffered heavy losses, but the losses of the central powers were greater, as the Russian 11th Army Corps defeated the 93rd Landsturm Brigade and captured 3,500 people, while losing 4,670 wounded and killed.
