= Battle of Utete =

Coordinates: 7.983333°S 38.783333°E

- Part of East African Campaign
Location	German East Africa

The Battle of Utete was fought during the East African Campaign of World War I.
