= Battle of Lukigura =

Battle during the First World War

Action at Lukigura River
- Part of East African Campaign
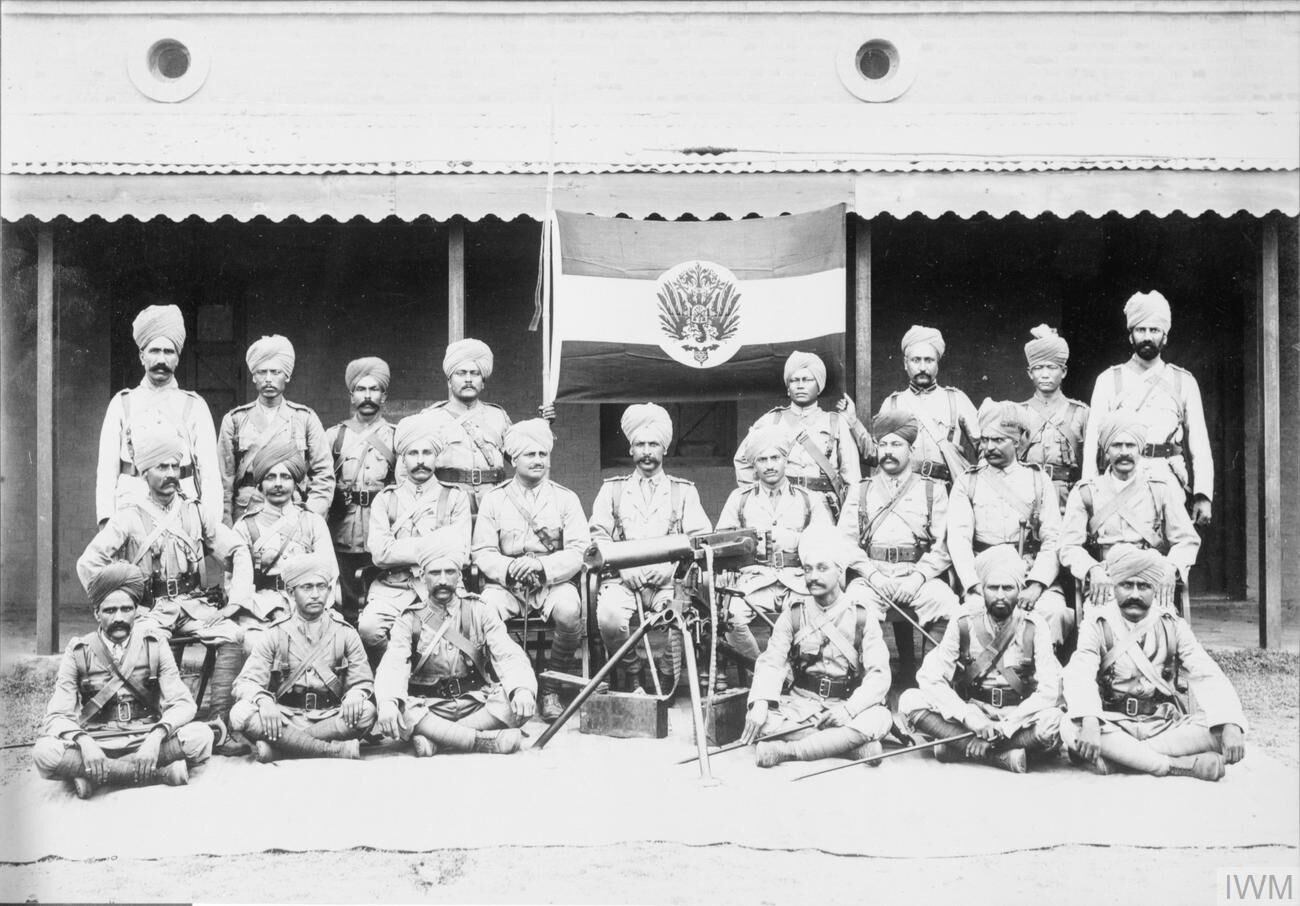
- Officers of 2nd Kashmir Rifles with the German flag and machine gun captured.
| Date | 24 June 1916 |
| Location | Lukigura River, German East Africa |
| Result | British victory |

Belligerents
| Germany: German East Africa | United Kingdom: India |

Commanders and leaders
| unknown | (British Raj) Hadar Ali Khan |

Units involved
| unknown | (British Raj) Jammu and Kashmir Rifles; 2nd Kashmir Rifles |

Strength
| 200 | 700 |

Casualties and losses
| 27 killed | 300 killed |

The Battle of Lukigura was fought during the East African Campaign of World War I.
