= Battle of El Tor (1915) =

- Part of the Middle Eastern theatre of World War I
Date	30 January – 12 February 1915
Location	El Tor, southern tip of the Sinai Peninsula, Sultanate of Egypt
Result	Egyptian victory

Belligerents
British Empire: Egypt	Ottoman Empire; German Empire

Commanders and leaders
(Sultanate of Egypt) Mostafa Helmy	(Ottoman Empire) Hussein Fawzi (German Empire) George Qandas

Units involved
A platoon of the 2nd Egyptian Bayada (infantry) battalion.	3rd Division Ottoman

Strength
200+150, two blocks led by Yuzbashi Mostafa Helmy and other Egyptian officers. 200, Infantry Brigade 2/7 Gurkha Rifles.	200 Bedouin, 1 Turkish officer and 2 German officers.

Casualties and losses
1 Gurkha soldier killed.	~60 Bedouins killed 100+ captured.

The Battle of El Tor was fought in 1915 between the United Kingdom, Sultanate of Egypt, the Ottoman and German empires, as a part of World War I.

== Background ==
In January 1915, Djemal Pasha - the commander of the Turkish soldiers - learned in Nekhel that El Tor had no force to protect it, so he sent a force consisting of fifty Bedouins and two German officers to occupy it, led by a German officer, “George Qandas,” and with him Bakbashi Hussein Fawzi from Benghazi, Libya. However, upon its arrival at El Tor, this force found that there was a garrison consisting of two hundred fighters and that it would not be easy to seize it. So they sent to Nekhel requesting new assistance, and their strength with the new assistance reached two hundred Bedouin fighters and some Turks. It occupied the village of El Tor ur, five miles away.

== Battle ==
On 30 January 1915, the 2/7th Infantry Brigade Gurkhas Rifles witnessed its first engagement at the Ismailia Bridge. Turkish artillery kept disrupting the British forces but not to the point of attacking. Several days later, members of the Gurkha Brigade had the opportunity to witness the first real clash since the brigade's inception in 1908.

Under the command of the Deputy Commander, Lieutenant Colonel Haldane, detachments of the Gurkha Brigade, along with a detachment of Egyptian soldiers, were sent following the 2nd Egyptian battalion, on a secret mission, in which they boarded the warship HMS Minerva on February 10, 1915. A band of Bedouins led by a German and a Turk threatened the town of El Tor on the Gulf of Suez. A plan was drawn up to land forces south of the town to cut off the attackers' return route, but that plan was abandoned due to the rough sea. HMS Minerva had to move, without lights, to the coast under cover of darkness. The Gurkhas, like fearless sailors, disembarked from the ship into small boats in the stormy sea. In silence and under the cover of darkness, they were able to reach the beach, even if some of them became seasick. The Egyptian platoon consisted of two squadrons, along with the Yuzbashi Mostafa Helmy and other Egyptian officers, and a force estimated at one hundred and fifty men. The Egyptians and Gurkha used the compass to reach the town of El Tor, nine miles away. Everything was done as planned, and the final attack began at six in the morning. As the vanguard of that force entered the town, fire began to return fire. It took them until noon to evacuate the Ottoman positions, when the mission was declared completed. About sixty Bedouin invaders were killed and more than a hundred captured by the Gurkha. One Gurkha soldier was killed in that operation, the first from the 7th Gurkha Rifle ever to fall in battle.

Meanwhile, the threat to the Suez Canal had lifted. Djemal Pasha had thrown away the best chance he was ever to have to disrupt traffic through the Canal.
