= Landing at Cape Domesnes =

- Part of the Eastern front of World War I
Date	22 [O.S. 9 October] 1915
Location	Cape Kolka, Russian Empire (Now in Latvia)
Result	Russian victory

Belligerents
Germany	Russian Empire; Imperial Navy

Commanders and leaders
Unknown	Alexander Kolchak; Pavel Shishko

Strength
Unknown	500–536

Casualties and losses
100 (Note: 40 to 50 killed and captured); 1 fort	4 wounded

Landing at Cape Domesnes (Russian: Высадка в порту Домеснес; German: Landung im Hafen von Domesnes) was a Russian landing operation during World War I. It was the largest Russian landing force in the war, and, as a result, the Russians fulfilled their goals. Alexander Kolchak, famous for the Civil War, participated in the battle.

== Background ==
During the great retreat, German ground forces reached the coast of the Gulf of Riga. In order to capture Riga, they tried to establish dominance in the strait, but suffered a crushing defeat and were forced to retreat. Now the Russian fleet dominated the strait, and some operations were carried out to help the ground forces.

== Battle ==
The operation began at dawn with the bombing, the Germans position, they did not betray this importance, which had a decisive influence on the course of the battle. The Germans did not know about the landing, which allowed the troops who landed to restore order and establish command of the troops. On the way to the enemy's fortifications, the Russians met a German company and stabbed the whole with bayonets. After that, the Russians reached the fortifications and destroyed several forts, and as soon as the main German forces approached, they immediately evacuated.

== Aftermath ==
As a result, panic was sown in the German rear, which allowed us to gain time for the defense of Riga. This is the largest landing of Russians during the World War.
