= Battle of Ukoko =

WW1 Battle in Kamerun (September 1914)

- Part of the Kamerun campaign in World War I
Date	21 September 1914
Location	Ukoko, southern German Kamerun
Result	Allied victory

Belligerents
British Empire; France: (French Third Republic) French Equatorial Africa	Germany: German Kamerun

Commanders and leaders
(French Third Republic) Col. Miquelard	(German Empire) Unknown

Strength
250	Unknown; 1 steamer 1 armed launch

Casualties and losses
7 killed	20 killed 1 steamer sunk 1 armed launch sunk

The Battle of Ukoko took place on 21 September 1914 during the Kamerun campaign of the First World War between French and German troops in Ukoko, Kamerun or modern day Cocobeach, Gabon.

== Background ==
Following the invasion of Kamerun after the outbreak of war between Germany and the Allies, the main military objective of France and Britain was to seize control of the colony's coast to ensure that additional men and supplies could not reach the German forces there. By mid-September 1914, British and French naval vessels had effectively blockaded the Wouri estuary and the main port of Douala.

On 21 September, the French gunboat, Surprise which had escorted French soldiers from Libreville, appeared before the village of Ukoko in southern Neukamerun. This town had a small German garrison and French forces wished to occupy it. The French vessel shelled the town and destroyed much of it.

== Landings and battle ==
Following the shelling, four boats carrying French soldiers and machine guns were launched from the Surprise in an attempt to take Ukoko. The small force, under the command of Colonel Miquelard, landed on the beach but encountered fire from German units who had entrenched themselves on higher ground. Later in the afternoon, nine more boatloads of French soldiers arrived on the beach and advanced up it. The Germans now came under heavy fire from the machine guns brought from the Surprise. Many of the new German recruits fled. At three o'clock in the afternoon, the French launched a major assault on the German positions. The resistance of German forces deteriorated and they eventually retreated.

During the battle, the Germans made attempts to attack the French gunboat, Surprise which was situated in Corisco Bay. The steamer Itolo and armed launch Khios were both sunk in attacks against the French ship.

== Aftermath ==
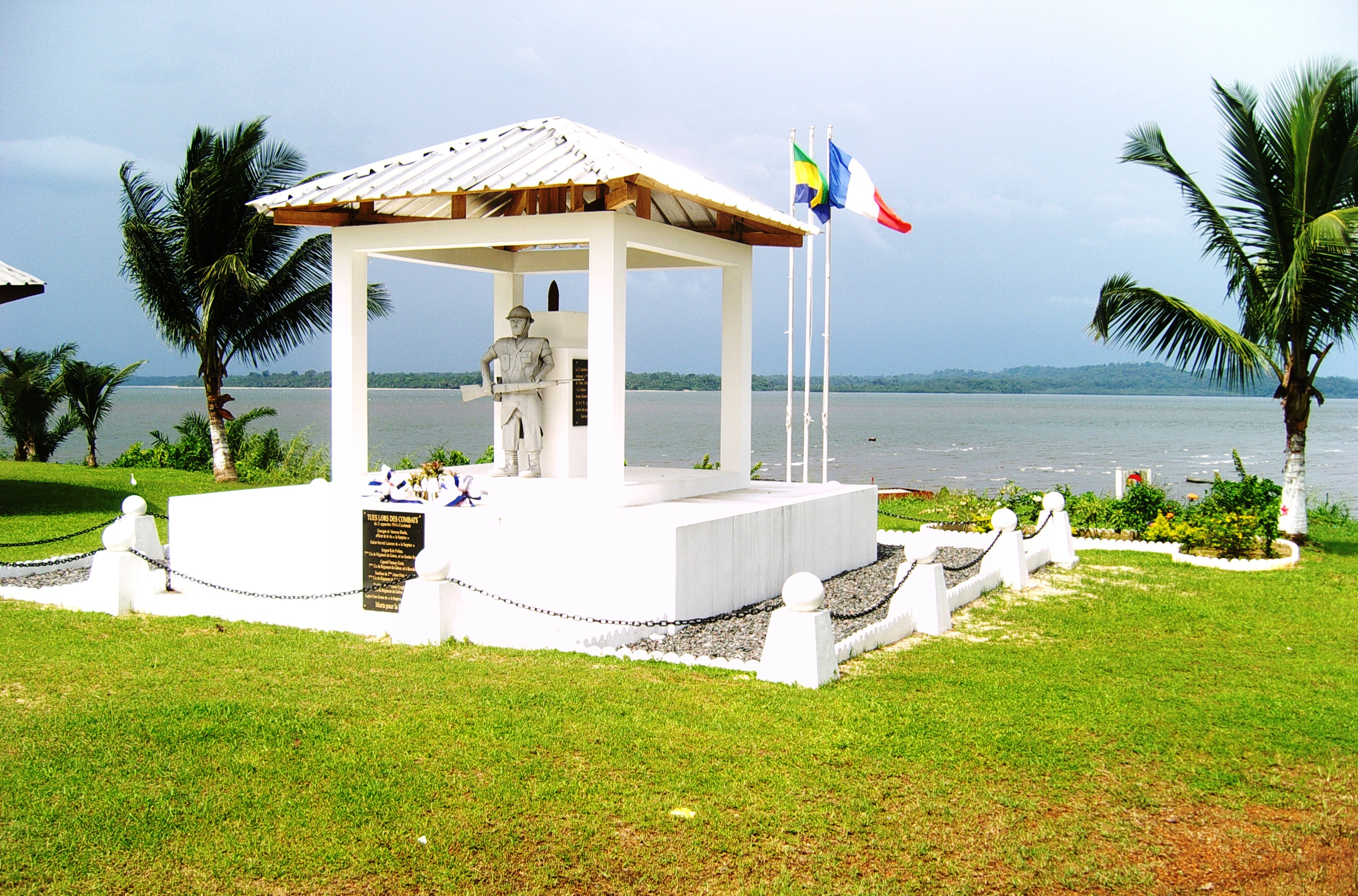
Memorial in Cocobeach commemorating the battle

Following the battle, the column under the command of Miquelard would push eastward along the southern border of Spanish Guinea. The German force that had once occupied Ukoko retreated to Mbini in the neutral Spanish colony of Río Muni to the north. This practice would be followed throughout the rest of the campaign where German units would escape to the Spanish colony and surrender there. The action at Ukoko, along with the landings that took place at Duala secured the coast of Kamerun for the Allies and greatly restricted the movements of German forces.
