= Air Battle on Istrana =

1917 air battle over Italy

Battle on Istrana
- Part of the Italian front of World War I
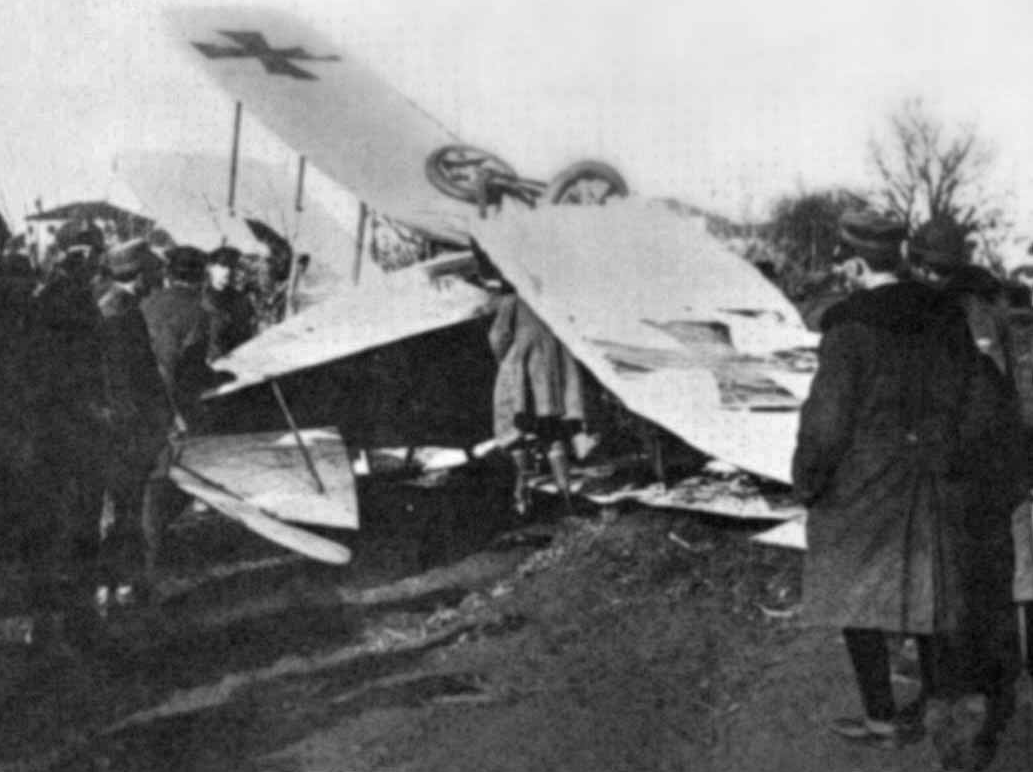
- A German DFW-C.V shot down near Musano
Date	25–26 December 1917
Location	Istrana
Result	Allied victory

Belligerents
Kingdom of Italy: British Empire; Canada	Austria-Hungary; Germany

Commanders and leaders
Unknown	Known List: Georg Est †; Franz Hertling †; (Austria-Hungary) Lt. Kessler (POW); Lt. Edehbole †; Karl Uecker †; Heinrich Pfeiffer †; (Austria-Hungary) Pallasch (POW); (Austria-Hungary) Pohlmann (POW); (Austria-Hungary) Schlamm (POW)

Units involved
Royal Italian Air Force (Note: 70th, 76th, 78th, 81st, 82nd squadrons); British Royal Air Force (Note: 28th squadron)	Luftstreitkräfte; K.u.K. Luftfahrtruppen

Strength
Total: 18 aircraft Italian Air Force: 15 Hanriot-HD.1s British Air Force: 3 Sopwith Camels	Total: 40 aircraft German Air Force: 25 DFW-C.Vs and some AEG-G.IVs Austro-Hungarian Air Force: 15 Albatros-D.IIIs and Albatros-D.Vs

Casualties and losses
70th Squadron: 4 pilots KIA, 5 Hanriot-HD.1s and 2 Hangars damaged (Note: One of them was the Gazzo Padovano hangar, i.e. where the 25 December attack came from.); 82nd Squadron: 2 Hanriot-HD.1s destroyed and damaged	15 pilots KIA; 10 DFW-CVs and 1 AEG-G.IV shot down

The Air Battle on Istrana was an air battle that took place in the sky over the town of Istrana on 26 December 1917, as part of the First World War. It was the most important air battle on the Italian front.

== Background ==
On 25 December, an unauthorized attack on the Istrana Air Base (at the time controlled by Germans & Austro-Hungarians) was carried out by the Canadian Captain William George "Billy" Barker, the Aviator Harold Byron Hudson and by another pilot which remained unknown. The attack was carried out at night from the Gazzo Padovano hangar. The attack was a success: on the German and Austro-Hungarian losses, we have 15 pilots killed and 5 planes damaged. After the battle the British left a sign on the hangar saying: "To the austrian flying corps from english RFC wishing you a very Merry Christmas".

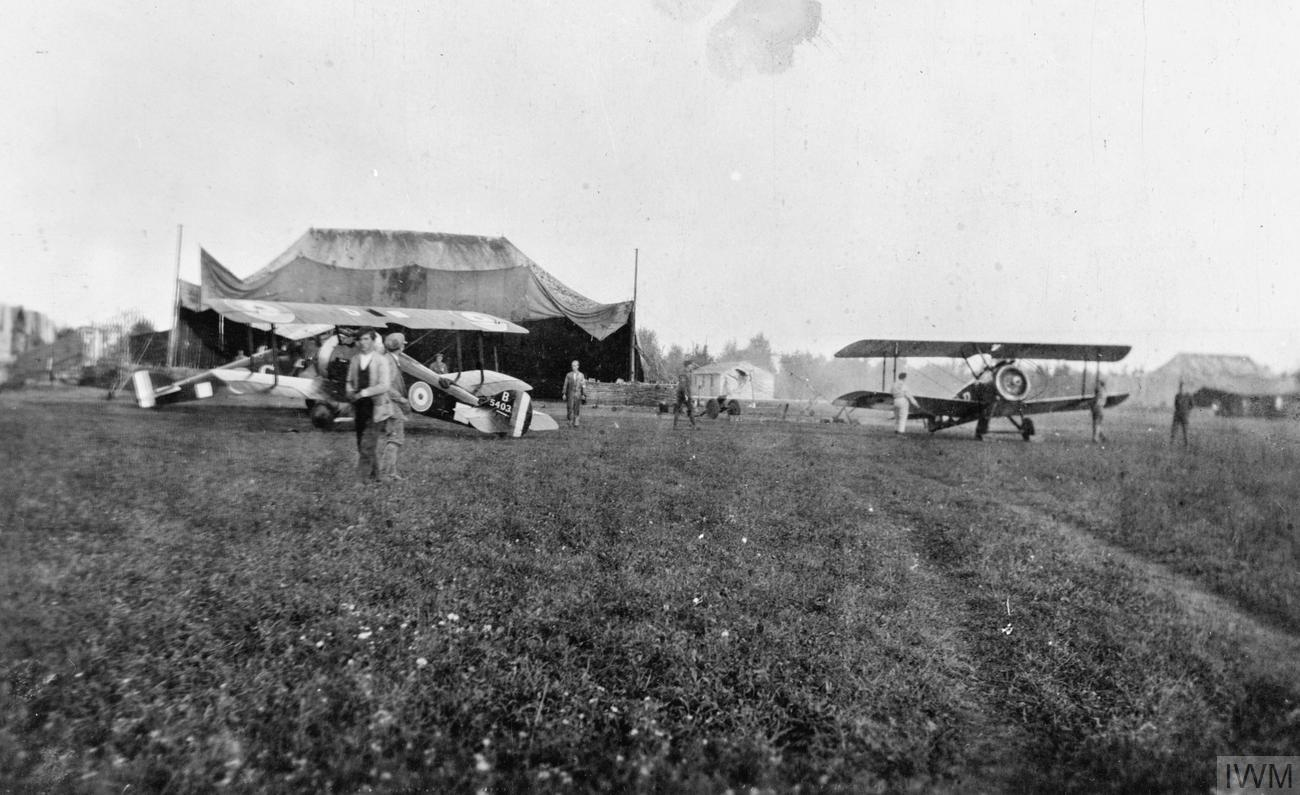
A British plane getting ready to fly for the raid.

== Course of events ==
To avenge the 25 December attack, the Germans and Austro-Hungarians jointly launched another attack on the base against what they thought were only British units. On the morning of 26 December, German and Austro-Hungarian planes attacked. The attack was described by Silvio Scaroni as the following:

(in Italian) Verso le 9 di ieri mattina, dunque, le vedette del campo, dato l'allarme, avvertivano che due forti gruppi di aeroplani nemici, dalla direzione del Montello, venivano verso il nostro campo. Con un binocolo volli dare un'occhiata verso la direzione indicata e vidi subito gli apparecchi che avanzavano serrati a una quota di 3000 metri; poco più in alto un altro gruppo di piccoli caccia: complessivamente potevano essere una quarantina di macchine...

After that, all the Italian and British planes stationed in the nearby Hangar joined the air battle. After bloody hours of fighting, the outcome was devastating for the Central Powers: they lost a total of 11 aircraft, while the Italians and British a total of 5. After the attack, the VI Airplane Group (later renamed 6th fighter group) received the Bronze Medal of Military Valor for the following reason:

(in Italian) Durante un'incursione aerea nemica, in cui ben trenta velivoli avversari bombardavano e mitragliavano il campo di aviazione del 6º Gruppo aeroplani, tutti i piloti presenti, non scossi dalle prime perdite, si levarono in volo e con un contrattacco fulmineo ed imbattibile abbattevano ben undici apparecchi nemici, costringendo gli altri alla fuga Cielo di Fossalunga (Note: The name given to Istriana by the Italians at that time.) nel 26 dicembre 1917.

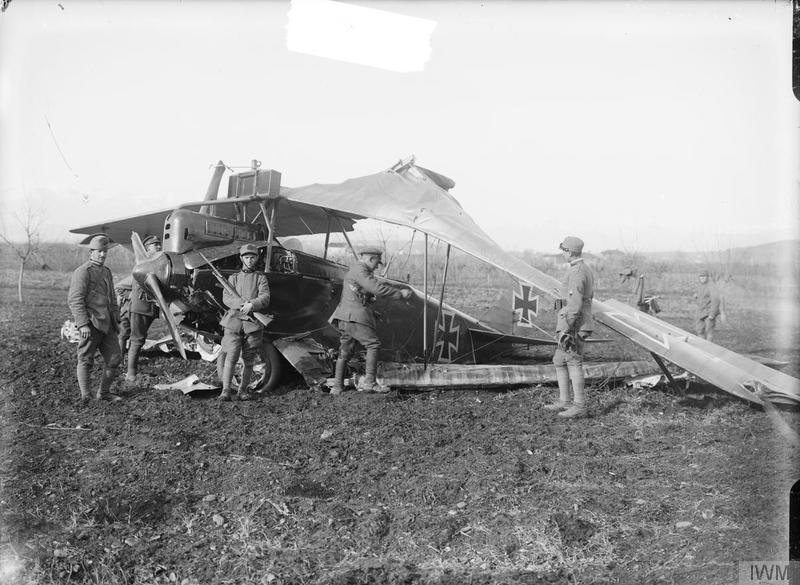
British and Italian soldiers inspecting a DFW-CV that was shot down in battle.

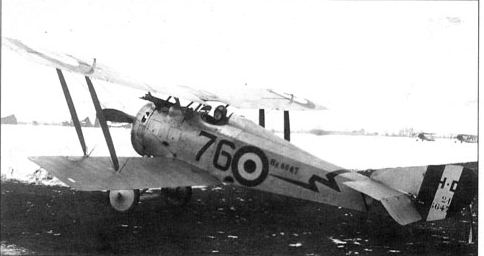
The Hanriot HD.1 6647 of the Lieutenant Mario Fucini.
