= Airstrike on Zonguldak =

1916 airstrike by Russian naval aviation on the Turkish port of Zonguldak

- Part of World War I
Date	February 6, 1916 (old style)
Location	Zonguldak, Ottoman Empire
Result	Russian victory

Belligerents
Russian Empire	Ottoman Empire German Empire

Strength
1 battleship; 1 cruiser; 4 destroyers; 2 seaplane tenders; 14 aircraft	AA guns; 1 submarine

Casualties and losses
None	1 cargo ship sunk; 1 sailing ship burned

The airstrike on Zonguldak was a 1916 military strike by the naval aviation of the Russian Black Sea Fleet on the Turkish port of Zonguldak. It was the first naval airstrike of the Russian Navy, and the first usage of carrier battle group in combat.

== Background ==
During World War I the city of Zonguldak housed coal mines, important for the war effort of the Ottoman Empire. As such, it was repeatably bombarded by the Russian Black Sea Fleet. After bombardments failed to destroy mines, it was decided to use naval aviation.

For this mission, the fleet put together a carrier battle group, designated "1st maneuver group", consisting of battleship Imperatritsa Mariya, cruiser Kagul (ex-Ochakov), two destroyers (Zavetnyy and Zavidnyy), and two seaplane tenders - Imperator Nikolai I and Imperator Alexandr I, each with seven Grigorovich M-5 seaplanes on board. The group left Sevastopol on February 5, 14:00. Two more destroyers, Pospeshnyy and Gromkiy, were dispatched at dawn, to provide weather reconnaissance.

== Attack ==
On February 6, at 10:20, the battle group stopped 15 miles (24 km) off Zonguldak, and started lowering seaplanes on the sea. Three aircraft failed to reach the bombardment area due to technical problems. The remaining eleven planes managed to reach the city, but due to heavy overcast and Turkish anti-aircraft fire could not drop their load with precision. However, one pilot managed to hit a German cargo ship, SS Irmingard, that was moored in the port, and sink it. One sailing vessel was also destroyed by fire.

Planes started returning to the battle group by 11:20, during which Imperator Alexandr I was torpedoed by German submarine SM UB-7. However, the ship managed to dodge it, and the boat was driven away by artillery fire. By 13:30 destroyers have found and towed to carriers the last seaplane, and the group returned to Sevastopol by the afternoon of February 7.

Damage to Irmingard turned out to be relatively light, and the vessel was repaired by February 25. It would be later damaged by Russian sea mines and destroyed by the Russian submarine Narval in October 1916.
