= Tipton Zeppelin raid =

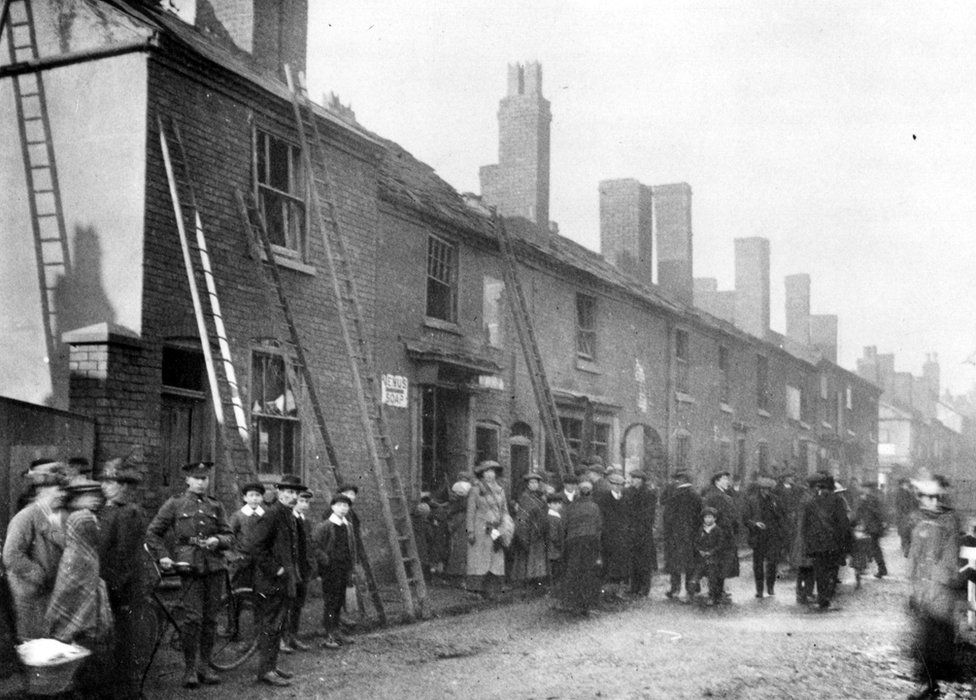
- Date: 31 January 1916
- Location: Tipton, West Midlands, England
- Type: German Zeppelin Raid
- Deaths: 14

The Tipton Zeppelin raid was a German Zeppelin bombing raid on the town of Tipton, West Midlands, England on 31 January 1916 in which 14 people were killed.

== Background ==
On 31 January 1916, two World War I German Zeppelins left an airbase navigating towards Norfolk, England. Upon approaching Norfolk the two Zeppelin airships entered heavy fog and mist, becoming lost due to the lack of navigation.

Airships L 21 and L 19 navigated over the Black Country by mistake due to the heavy fog. The L 21 airship was the first to arrive over the Black Country and was piloted by Captain-lieutenant Max Dietrich, uncle of Hollywood actress Marlene Dietrich. Upon seeing the lights and canals of the Black Country, Dietrich believed he was navigating over Liverpool, the original target.

== Bombings ==
Airship L 21 arrived over Tipton at around 8.00pm on 31 January 1916 with pilot Max Dietrich again spotting lights. Believing he was over Liverpool, Max Dietrich dropped three high-explosive bombs from the L 21 airship on Waterloo Street and then Union Street where it destroyed two houses, damaged several others and set alight a gas main.

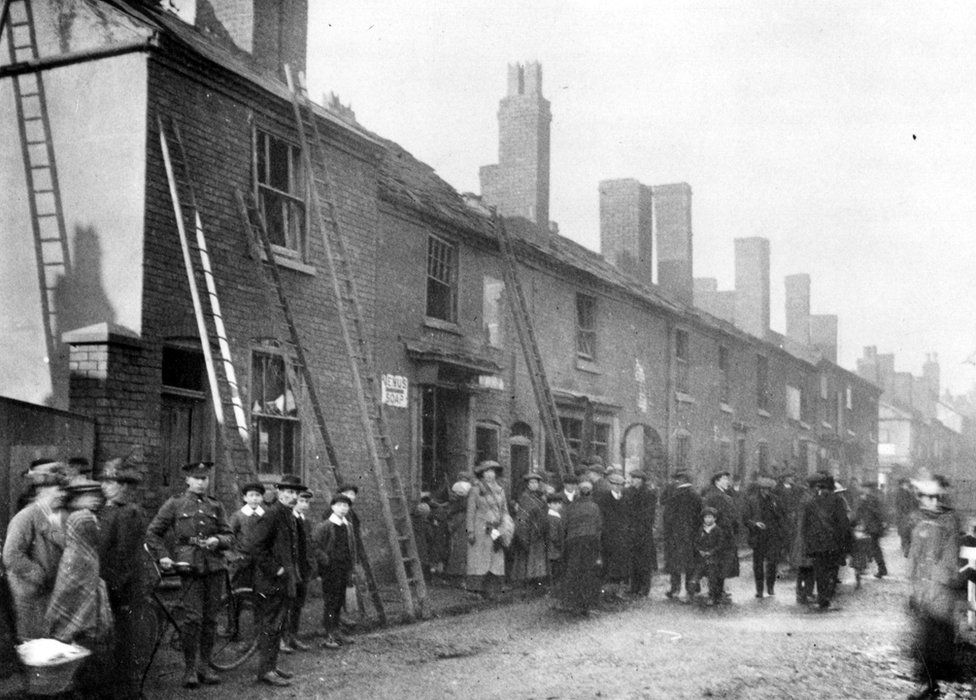
Houses in Union Street, Tipton damaged by the Zeppelin raid

14 people were killed in the bombing on Union Street. Five men, five women and four children.

Three bombs were then dropped on Bloomfield Road and Barnfield Road.

After those raids, airship L 21 dropped two bombs on the nearby train station in Owen Street. The bombs landed between the canal towpath and the station causing extensive damage.

After dropping bombs on Tipton, airship L 21 navigated towards Coseley, Wednesbury and Walsall to continue the bombing campaign.

Airship L 19 dropped a bomb onto the roof of a house in Park Lane West. The bomb did not detonate when it struck the roof, instead it bounced into the road before detonating 5ft in front of a hotel. As the bomb exploded it badly damaged the Bush Inn pub, leaving it in ruins. It was believed that the bomb had exploded at 12.20am as this was the time on the damaged clock that was inside the bar area of the pub. The clock had stopped working after the bar area of the pub was damaged. No one was injured or killed by the bombing from airship L 19. The licensee, Thomas Taylor, and his family only suffered cuts from the flying debris. The Bush Inn pub was rebuilt after World War I had ended and remained in business until 1995.

== Victims ==
- William Greensill, aged 64
- Mary Greensill, aged 67
- Sarah Jane Morris, aged 44
- Martin Morris, aged 11
- Nellie Morris, aged 8
- Elizabeth Cartwright, aged 35
- Thomas Henry Church, aged 57
- Benjamin Goldie, aged 42
- Daniel Whitehouse, aged 34
- Annie Wilkinson, aged 44
- Frederick Yates, aged 9
- George Onions, aged 12
- Louisa Yorke, aged 30
- Arthur Edwards, aged 26

== Legacy ==
A Tipton Civic Society blue plaque was placed on the H C Pullinger electrical shop in Union Street on 29 January 2016. The shop is now located on the site where the bombs detonated onto the houses in the street. H C Pullinger funded the plaque to commemorate the centenary anniversary of the raid.

The following day on 30 January 2016, a plaque was unveiled in Tipton Library to remember the 14 victims of the bombings.

On 7 February 2016, a plaque was unveiled by West Bromwich West MP Adrian Bailey in Tipton Cemetery to commemorate the 14 people killed in the raid. The plaque was funded by Friends of Tipton Cemetery with more than 100 people turning up to witness the unveiling. People included relatives of the victims, local people and Tipton Mayor Councillor Barbara Price.

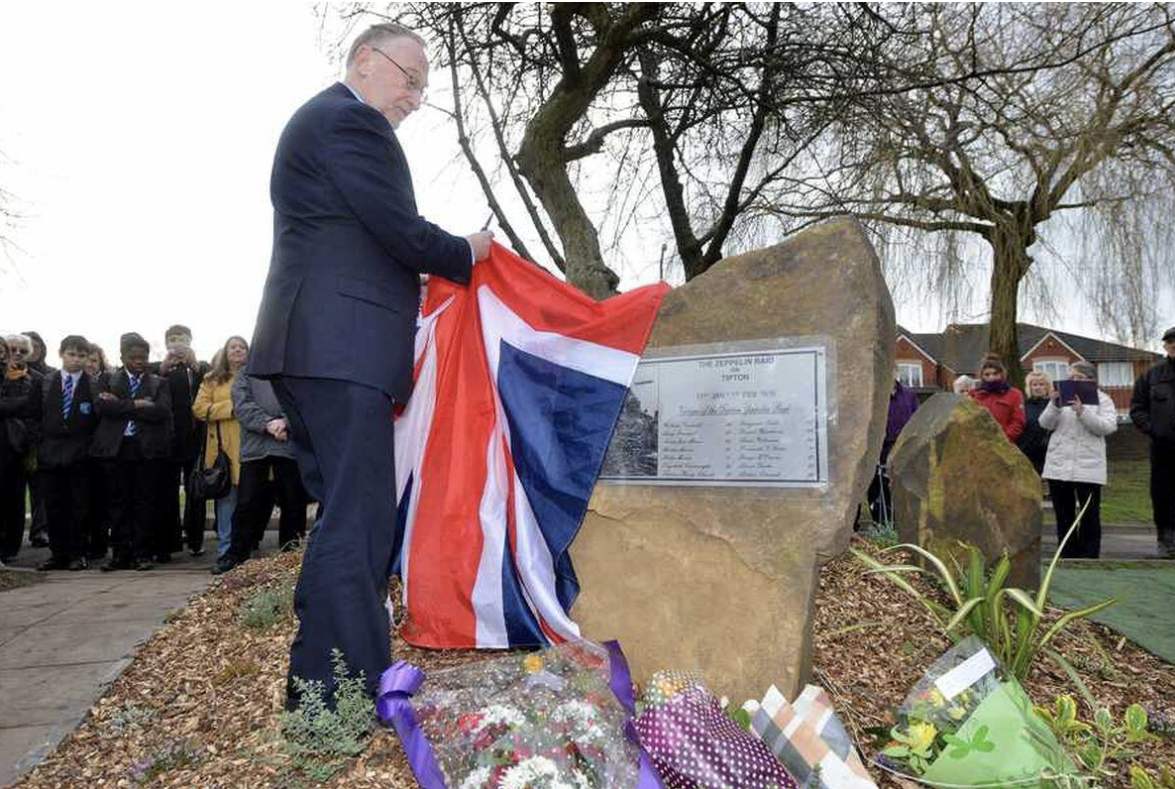
Adrian Bailey MP unveiling the memorial plaque in Tipton cemetery.
