= Battle of Kimbaramba =

- Part of East African Campaign
Location	German East Africa

The Battle of Kimbaramba was fought in German East Africa (now Tanzania), in 1916, during the East African Campaign of World War I.
