= Kilimatinde =

- Location in Tanzania
- Coordinates: 5°51′S 34°57′E
- Country: Tanzania
- Region: Singida Region
- Time zone: UTC+3 (East Africa Time)

Kilimatinde is a village in the Singida region of Tanzania, that began as a German colonial fortress.
