= Termination of the German and Austro-Hungarian Legations =

- Part of World War I
Date	August 17th, 1917
Location	Beijing, China 39°08′01″N 117°12′19″E
Result	Allied success
Territorial changes	The German Legation is occupied by the Netherlands, while the Austro-Hungarian Legation is occupied by Spain

Belligerents
China	Germany Austria-Hungary

After the sinking of the SS Athos and the severing of diplomatic ties with the Central Powers, The Republic Of China decided to officially declare war and liquidate the German Empire and Austro-Hungarian Empire's Legations in Peking.

== Background ==
Peking had 11 Legations total, The first Legation was the Legation of the British Empire established on 1861 after the Second Opium War. More foreign nations would set up legations for themselves later on, two of those foreign nations being the German Empire and Austria-Hungary.

== Actions and Occupations ==
German and Austro-Hungarian defenses

The Germans had installed the East Asian Marine Detachment which used to be only one company but was made into three during the Xinhai Revolution. Two of the companies would be stationed at Tienstin and one would be stationed in Peking and would be under its own command. The Austro-Hungarians however would have one or two ships to defend the China seas. The crew of Austrian ships would be the only defense of the Legation.

Chinese Occupation

On August 17, 1917, three days after the Chinese official declaration of war against the German Empire and Austro-Hungarian Empire the Republic Of China would occupy the Legations of Germany and Austria-Hungary.

Dutch and Spanish Occupation

The German Legation would be later be occupied by the Netherlands. And the Austro-Hungarian Legation would be occupied by the Spanish Empire.

== Aftermath ==
By the Treaty of Versailles, Treaty of Saint-Germain-en-Laye and the Treaty of Trianon, Germany and Austria renounces their extraterritorial rights in the concessions and the Legations.
