= SMS Geier incident =

1914 detention of a German ship by US forces

SMS Geier Incident
- Part of Part of Asian and Pacific theatre of World War I
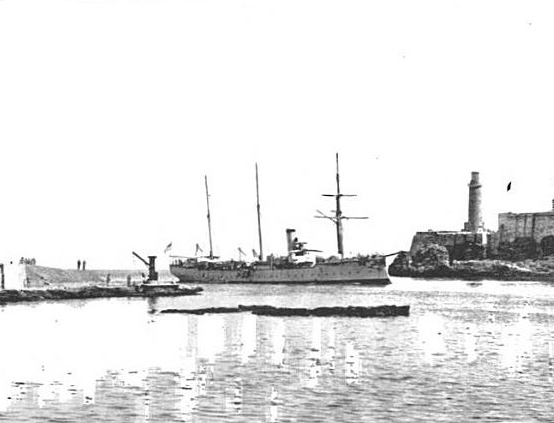
- SMS Geier
Date	October – November 1914
Location	Honolulu, Territory of Hawaii, United States
Result	SMS Geier and Locksun interned

Belligerents
United States: Territory of Hawaii; Japan	Germany

Strength
United States: Territory of Hawaii; Fort Shafter; Fort Kamehameha; Japan: Japanese battleship Hizen; Japanese cruiser Asama	SMS Geier; Collier Locksun

Casualties and losses
None	All crew of the ships were interned

The SMS Geier Incident involved the German unprotected cruiser SMS Geier and the collier Locksun that went sailed into Honolulu during World War I. This increased some tensions between Germany and the United States during the war.

== Background ==
Geier sailed out from British Singapore before the United Kingdom had declared war on Germany and tried rallying with Admiral Maximilian von Spee and the East Asia Squadron. She intercepted a British steamer and captured her but not sink her. After Japan declared war on Germany, Geier was being hunted and forced to go into Honolulu, within the territory of the United States which was still a neutral country at the time.

== United States reaction ==
The United States had a law announcing that belligerent nations could only have ships in American ports for under 24 hours. The Americans had Fort Shafter and Fort Kamehameha to enforce this. The captain of the ship, Karl Grasshof claimed that the ship was in need of boiler and machine repairs. The department of state inspected the ship and gave them three weeks to repair the ship. If time ran out the ships would be interned.

== Japanese involvement ==
When Geier was still being repaired, two Japanese ships, Hizen and Asama were outside of Honolulu waiting to intercept Geier. On Geier's last day in Honolulu, a lot of bystanders who were mostly Japanese living in the city were awaiting a battle between the Germans and the Japanese. However, this did not happen and the captain surrendered the ship to the Americans.

== Aftermath ==
After the crews of the ships were interned, they were welcomed by the people living on Oahu. On April 6, 1917, the Americans finally joined the war and recommissioned the ship USS Schurz.
