= 1916 uprising in Hilla =

- Part of the Mesopotamian campaign
- 1916 uprising in Hilla (Iraq)
Date	November 1916
Location	Hilla, Ottoman Iraq
Result	Ottoman victory

Belligerents
Ottoman Empire	Arab Rebels

Commanders and leaders
Garrison commander: (Ottoman Empire) Unknown; Punitive force commander: (Ottoman Empire) ‘Ākif Beg	Muhammad ‘Ali al-Qazwini; Among others

Strength
Garrison at Hilla: Unknown, but less than the rebels; Punitive force: 4,000–6,000	Unknown

Casualties and losses
Unknown	1,500 killed, "thousands" deported

The 1916 uprising in Hilla or the Akif incident was an Arab uprising against the Ottoman Empire in 1916.

== Background ==
The Ottoman defeat in the Battle of Shaiba in April 1915 had damaged the authority of the Ottomans in the eyes of the Arabs, leading to an uprising in Najaf in May 1915. Following their victory, emissaries from Najaf began encouraging an uprising in Hilla.

== Uprising ==
The uprising in Hilla took place in November 1916. The Ottomans put up a desperate fight in the city but found themselves outnumbered by waves of Bedouin and deserters. After the rebels captured the city, the Ottomans sent a punitive force of 4,000-6,000 troops under ‘Ākif Beg. On the 11th, Ākif wrote a letter to Hillah, claiming that he needed to cross the city to get to Nasiriyah. He asked to meet the prominent people of the city to negotiate with them for permission to cross. When the leaders of the city, such as Muhammad ‘Ali al-Qazwini and others, met them, the Ottomans detained them and declared to the inhabitants of the city that if their crossing through the city to Nasiriyah was opposed, they would kill their hostages.

== Aftermath ==
The residents abided by the Ottoman demands, but Akif reneged on his promise. Ottoman forces hung 128 or 126 people, carried of their women, and killed 1500 in all, as well as deporting "thousands" of people to Diyarbakır. This incident served to increase anti-Ottoman sentiment among Arab Shiites, some of whom came to Hilla to aid the rebels, but were too late.

Al-Fatlah chieftain Mudbir al-Far'un condemned the Ottoman massacre:

This is a statement to the Arab nation and especially the Iraqi tribes […] Oh Arab brothers who have been cultivated by race and who trace their lineages back to Qahtan [one of the ‘fathers’ of the Arabs] […] oh those of jealousy, valour; and lords of aid and courage […] let everyone who belongs to Qahtan know that this [Ottoman] state wants to wipe you off the face of the earth and to replace you with their own Turkish kind […] By God all who did nothing in the face of such deeds and who obeyed this unjust state have none of the Arabs’ zeal. Have you not read its [the state’s] newspapers? They discriminate and degrade Arabs, and here it is, overflowing with insults to the Arabs; they even call black dogs ‘Arab’.

— Mudbir al-Far'un, 1916 condemnation

Muhammad ‘Ali al-Qazwini was spared by the Ottomans and lived until 1937.
