= Battle of Syniava =

Battle of Sieniawa
- Part of Gorlice–Tarnów offensive during the Eastern Front of the World War I
Date	13–15 May 1915
Location	Sieniawa, Austria-Hungary
Result	Russian victory

Belligerents
Austria-Hungary	Russian Empire

Commanders and leaders
(Austria-Hungary) Archduke Joseph Ferdinand of Austria	Vladimir Irmanov; Konstantin Nekrasov

Strength
113,000	Unknown

Casualties and losses
Heavy; 7,436 captured	Medium

Battle of Sieniawa (Russian: Битва под Синявами); The operation of the Russian army during the offensive of the central powers in Galicia. The operation was carried out in order to divert the attention of the Austro-Hungarian command from Przemysl, which was under threat of capture, despite a decisive tactical victory and a large advance deep into the territory, it was not possible to distract the enemy's attention.

== Attack ==
The offensive began on the night of May 13, the attack on the Austrian positions near Sinyavy was carried out very successfully for the Russians, 2,500 prisoners and an entire line of trenches were captured with almost no losses. And by May 14, the Russians had achieved success in other areas of the offensive, The 3rd Caucasian Corps in the northern direction took another 1,000 prisoners. On the afternoon of the same day, the Austro-Hungarians tried to launch a counteroffensive, but failed, although they inflicted significant losses on the Russian offensive began on May 15, also successful, the Austrians, under the onslaught of the Russians, went to the other side of the San river.

== Sources ==
- Oleynikov, А. (2023). Германский натиск на Восток 1915 [The German push to the East 1915] (in Russian). ISBN 978-5-4484-4327-5.
