= Battle of Njinjo =

- Part of East African Campaign
Date	October 1916
Location	Njinjo, German East Africa (in modern Kilwa District, Tanzania) 8°48′36.36″S 38°53′33.72″E
Result	British Victory

Belligerents
German Empire: German East Africa	British Empire
- Location within Tanzania

The Battle of Njinjo was a minor engagement between British and German colonial forces during the East African Campaign of World War I.
