= Battle of Kidodi =

Coordinates: 7.610169°S 36.987862°E

- Part of East African Campaign
- Map of Tanzania
Location	Kidodi, German East Africa (now Tanzania)

The Battle of Kidodi was fought during the East African Campaign of World War I.
