= Battle of Mkalamo =

1916 battle of World War I

Coordinates: 4.98333°S 38.1167°E

- Part of East African Campaign
Location	Mkalamo, German East Africa (now Tanzania)

The Battle of Mkalamo was fought on 9 June 1916 during the East African Campaign of World War I.
