= Battle of Morogoro =

Battle in Eastern Africa during World War 1

Coordinates: 5.18333°S 38.4°E

- Part of the East African Campaign
Location	Morogoro
Result	British victory

Belligerents
German Empire	British Empire

Strength
Unknown	Unknown

Casualties and losses
Unknown	Unknown

The Battle of Morogoro was fought during the East African Campaign of World War I.
