= Battle of Vulcan Pass =

Battle during WW1 in Romania

- Part of the First Battle of Petrozsény and World War I
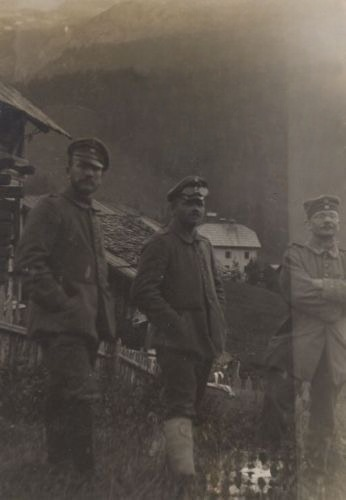
- German soldiers during the Battle of Vulcan Pass
Date	21–22 September 1916 (1 day)
Location	Vulcan Pass, Austria-Hungary
Result	German victory
Territorial changes	Vulcan Pass is captured by German forces

Belligerents
Germany	Romania

Commanders and leaders
(German Empire) Friedrich Paulus	(Kingdom of Romania) Ioan Culcer (Kingdom of Romania) Ioan Muică

Units involved
1st Bavarian Jäger Regiment; 2nd Battalion of the I.R. 187	1st Army: 11th Division

Casualties and losses
17 killed 83 wounded	526 Romanian soldiers captured

The Battle of Vulcan Pass took place on the Eastern Front of World War I. Vulcan Pass was captured by the Germans on 21 September during the retreat of the Romanians. The retreat occurred after the Romanian army was beaten near the city of Hermannstadt. However, on the following day, the Romanian units were still actively fighting against the advancing German troops. On 22 September, two German battalions stormed the Vulcan Pass. In taking it, the Germans also captured 526 Romanian prisoners.
