= Bombing of Warsaw in World War I =

Bombing of Warsaw
- Part of First World War
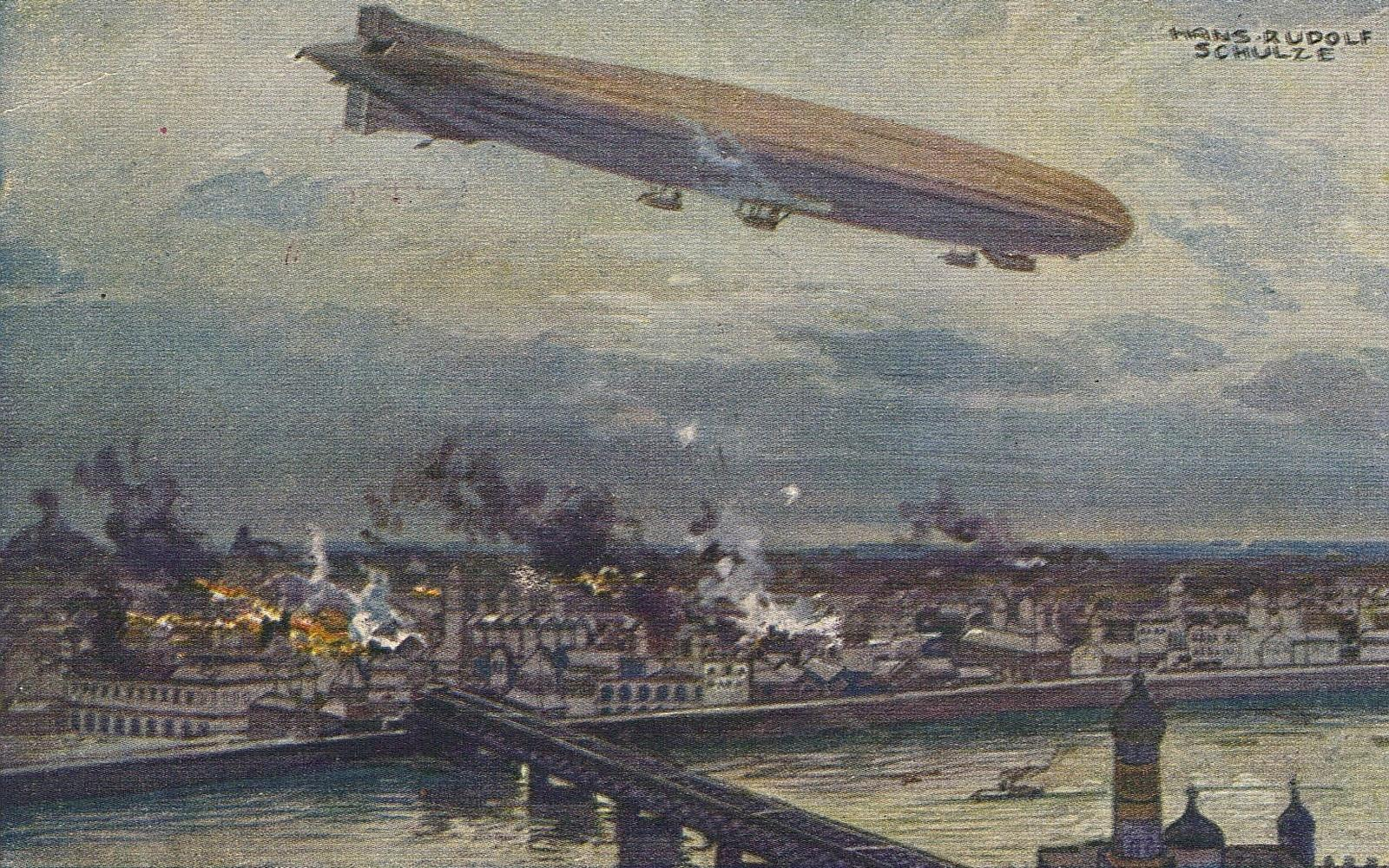
- German airship Schütte-Lanz SL2 bombing Warsaw in 1914. Watercolor on paper by Hans Rudolf Schulze
Date	26 September 1914 - 11 August 1915
Location	Warsaw
Result	Inconclusive
Territorial changes	Russian Empire

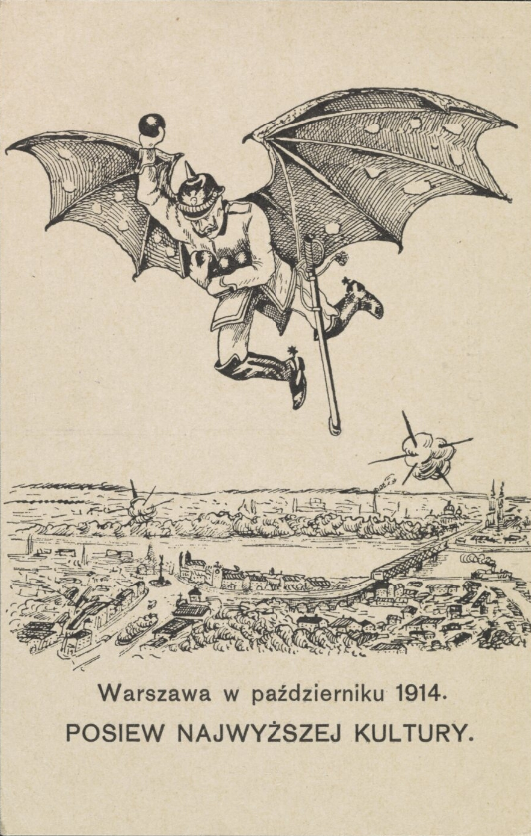
The Seed of Highest Culture. Warsaw in October 1914. Political cartoon depicting the German Emperor and Prussian King Wilhelm II as a winged monster bombarding the city.

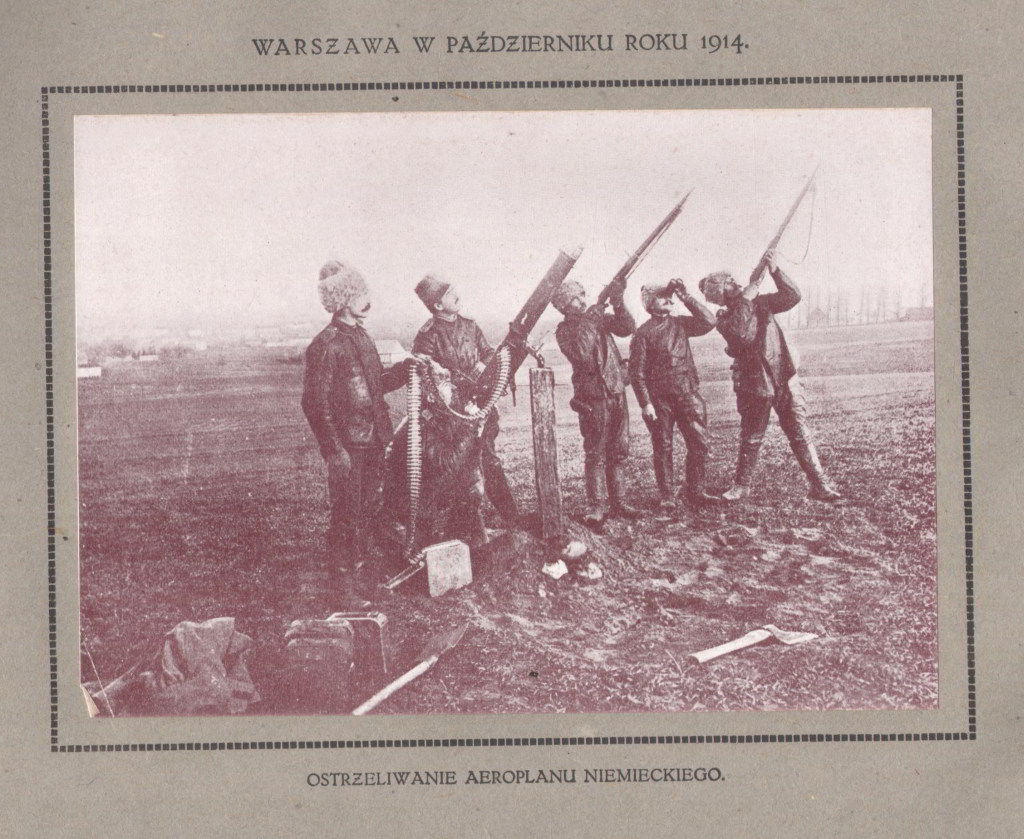
Propaganda photo from October 1914 showing Russian anti-aircraft defenses in Warsaw ready to attack German planes

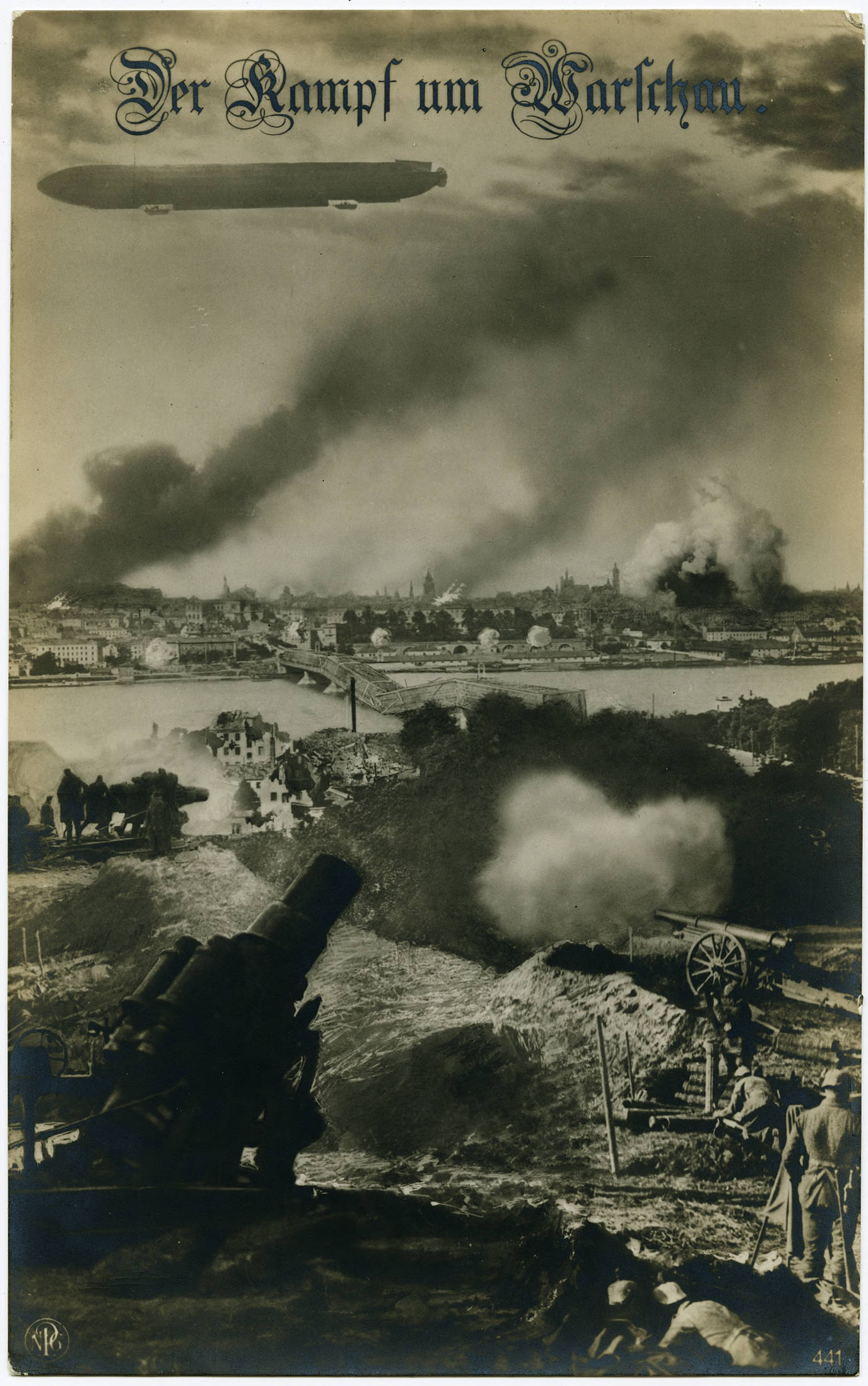
German postcard showing a fictitious shelling of Warsaw using, among other things, an airship and a 205 mm Škoda mortar

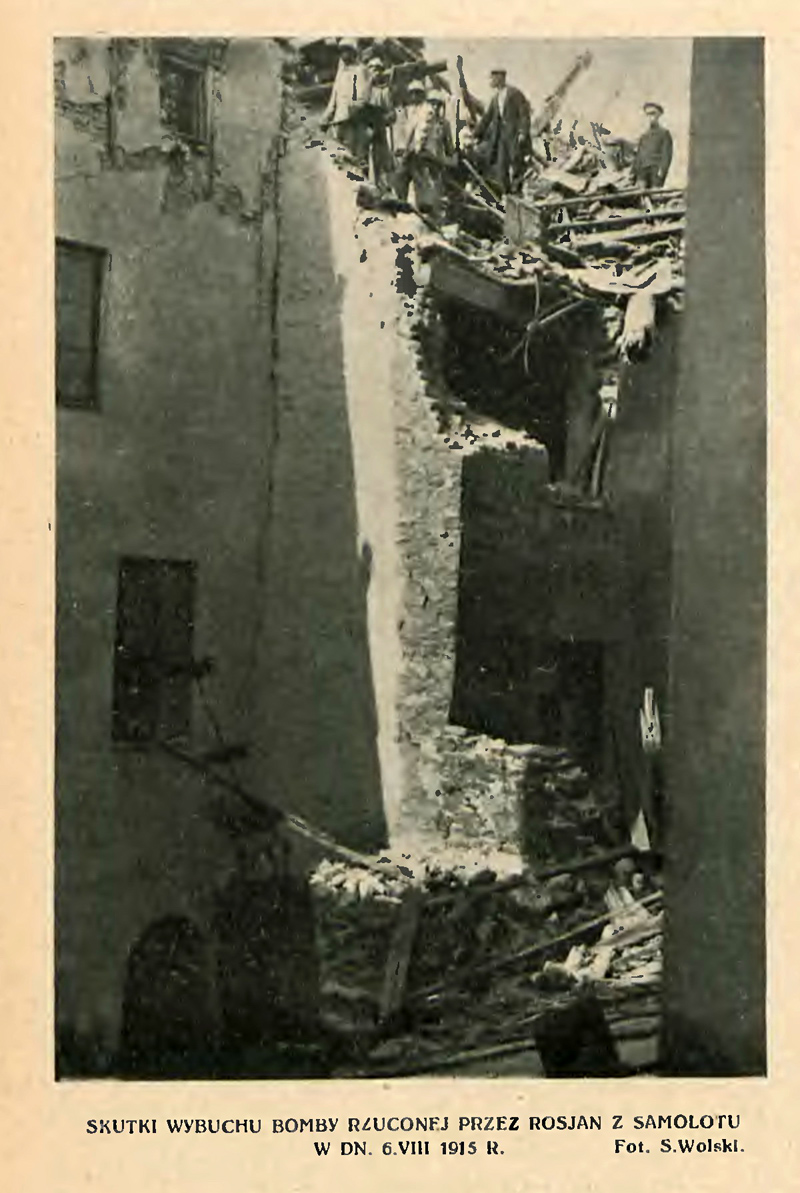
The effects of a bomb explosion in Old Town, thrown by the Russians from an airplane on August 6, 1915

The bombing of Warsaw in World War I started with the aerial bombing campaign of Warsaw conducted by German and Russian air forces during World War I.

Until August 1915, the city was defended by Russian anti-aircraft artillery, part of the Warsaw Military District. It was deployed in some forts of the Warsaw Fortress, and there were observation posts on the outskirts of the city.

After the occupation of Warsaw by German troops, the Russians carried out several air raids on the city.

== First raid ==
On 26 September 1914, almost two months after the outbreak of the "Great War", at 5:00 a.m. a German airship appeared over the capital of the Congress Poland, gliding from the west on the Warsaw–Vienna railway line. The anti-aircraft defense took up the fight; on the Russian side there were dead and wounded . The German "cigar" dropped two bombs, one of which did not explode, and the other destroyed a booth and a telephone pole.

One of the Warsaw residents described the German air raid as follows (original spelling):

This morning I woke up suddenly. It was barely dawn in the room [...]. From a distance I heard a dull clatter in the morning, and after that something rattled very close and very hard, as if someone was hitting wood hard against wood. [...] I woke Zosia, who is always hungry for excitement. Zosia ran to the window and, having seen how quiet it was all around, finally guessed with me that it was in Mokotów Field that they were shooting at German planes. However, we were so absent-minded and sleepy that we did not go to the windows and raised the blinds, and we lost sight of the large, illuminated zeppelin that was flying over Warsaw, and at which they were firing ineffectively from cannons and rifles . This was the first visit of the zeppelin to Warsaw. I sadly hope that it will not be the last. According to various versions, there were three or even five zeppelins and they dropped bombs on the Vistula Railway bridge and the viaduct on Kaliska Street [...].

The Russian commander of the Modlin Fortress reported to the front commander that the fortress batteries had opened fire on the zeppelin one after another, firing several hundred shots, but to no avail. Newspapers reported that the airship had been shot down near Ciechanow.

== Other raids in 1914 ==
- On 27 September, a German plane dropped a bomb on Fort Alexei (now Fort Traugutta), it did not cause any damage
- On 10 October, 16 people were injured in an air raid, although the newspapers did not say whether it was an airship or a plane.
- On October 16, bombs dropped from a zeppelin fell on, among others, Chłodna and Okopowa Streets and the now non-existent Vienna Railway Station. 46 people were injured; in total, the Germans dropped 15 bombs on the city that day.
- On 19 October, a German airship bombed the property at 25 Pawia Street. Twelve bombs fell on Bracka Street, again on Chłodna Street, Dzika Street, Jerusalem Avenue, Mazowiecka Street, Nalewki Street, Nowiniarska Street and Ogrodowa Street and on Praga. 18 people died and 38 were injured – it was the deadliest air raid on the city.
- On 22 October, a bomb from a zeppelin fell in front of the Embassy of the United States.
- On 26 October, a zeppelin appeared and dropped leaflets calling on Russian soldiers to surrender, with assurances of decent conditions in prisoner of war camps.

The October air raids took place during the Battle of Warsaw and Dęblin between Russian and German-Austrian forces.

- On 29 November, Zielony Square (now Dąbrowskiego) was bombed, damaging the now non-existent monument to loyalist officers who died on November Night.
- On 21 December, an air raid resulted in eight explosions – one person was killed and two seriously injured.

== Summary of air raids in 1914 ==
In a book published in 1937 on the occasion of the 35th anniversary of the emergency medical service, Dr. Józef Zawadzki summed up the German air raids in 1914 as follows (original spelling):

"Bombs were dropped by German airmen from a height of 1,000 to 1,500 meters in 1914, usually filled with metal shavings and pieces in addition to the explosive mass. They were thrown with the aim of cutting off communication or destroying state buildings. It must be stated, however, that they never reached their intended target, but only wounded the almost innocent population of the city"

In December 1914, a one-day newspaper Jednodniówka published an article which strongly condemned the bombings carried out by the Germans (original spelling):

"The modern Huns have taken it upon themselves to systematically terrorize the defenseless population of flourishing cities by throwing devastating bombs from their improved aeroplanes and Zeppelins. Trusting that bullets will not reach them, they circle on their aerial ships like bloodthirsty vultures, looking out for where they can bring terror and cause incalculable damage with impunity. Despite the protests of the civilized world, the devilish work of the aerial bandits does not cease. The only obstacles for them are frost or heavy fog and rain. With the advent of weather, they repeat their bandit performances. In their perverted brains, the Germans develop bold plans for the conquest of the world by destroying civilizational environments precisely by throwing bombs from aeroplanes and Zeppelins. As in the ancient prophecies about the Antichrist, that he would appear on a fiery chariot, so in reality the Germans, on illuminated Zeppelins, appear before our eyes at night, arousing hatred in us"

According to the data of the Warsaw Ambulance Service, 104 victims were helped during the air raids in 1914, 27 injured were taken to hospitals (16 died). If we count those who died on the spot, the number of people killed was about 40.

== Air raids in 1915 ==
In January 1915, the Russians strengthened their anti-aircraft defense by creating a network of 19 intelligence and 18 observation posts around the city (including in Wyszogrodzie, Grójcu and Górze Kalwarii). Six fighters were stationed at the Mokotów airport.

In 1915, there were definitely fewer air raids on Warsaw. On 7 February, a German plane bombed the area around Nowy Świa Street, and on 14 and 16 February, an airship attacked the bridges over the Vistula. However, the Germans mainly bombed towns near Warsaw.

On 5 August 1915, soldiers of the Imperial German Army entered Warsaw. In this new situation, the Russian air force began bombing the city. On 6 August, a Russian bomb fell on houses at Wąski Dunaj Street in the Old Town, killing 1 and wounding 4 people. On 11 August 1915, a Russian plane dropped a bomb at 4 Ptasia Street, damaging apartments and wounding 3 people – this was the last air raid on Warsaw during World War I.

== See also ==
- List of military engagements of World War I
- German bombing of Britain, 1914–1918
