= Raid on Ruhnu (1917) =

Attack by the Imperial German Navy seaplanes on 15 June 1917

- Part of Naval warfare of World War I
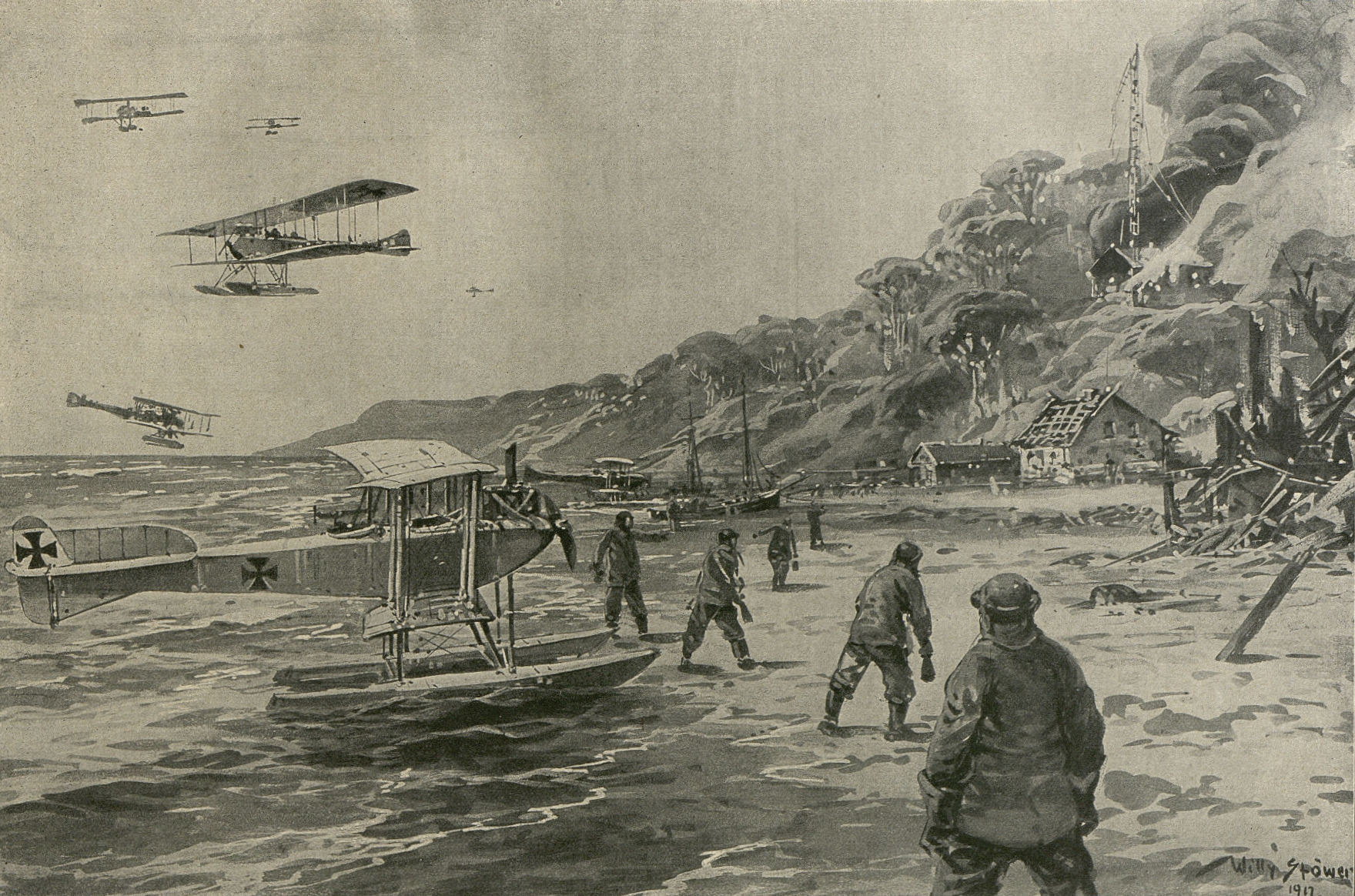
- German seaplanes land on the Ruhnu Island to destroy the Russian radio station (illustration by Willy Stöwer from 1917)
Date	15 June 1917
Location	Ruhnu Island, Gulf of Riga, present-day Estonia 32°39′N 16°55′W
Result	German victory

Belligerents
Germany	Russia

Commanders and leaders
?	?

Strength
Several seaplanes	Unknown

Casualties and losses
None	Unknown

The Raid on Ruhnu on 15 June 1917 was a minor operation proceeded by Imperial German Naval Air Forces in Ruhnu Island in the Gulf of Riga during World War I. Several German seaplanes landed on the coast of Ruhnu to attack the Russian telegraph station and after that retreated to their home base, which is considered as the first air-landing ambush operation in the military history.

== Background ==
Ruhnu Island in an isolated island the southern part of the Gulf of Riga with a mayor strategic importance across the centuries. Being seized by the Russian Empire 1708. In 1877 a new lighthouse was built there and in the beginning of the 20th century also a radio station. Since the German armies reached the borders of Latvia in spring 1915, on 1 May 1915 the Imperial German Navy proceeded a naval raid on Ruhnu facilities, seriously damaging the beacon and the surrounding area. Cruiser SMS Augsburg took part on the attack.

To reduce the increased activity of the Russian naval forces in underwater and mine warfare in June 1917, German Admiralty decided another attack on Ruhnu Island, this time targeting Russian telegraph station there. On June 13, German aircraft bombarded the Russian base at Lebara port with some high explosive bombs, the next day the Ruhnu telegraph station was bombed setting several buildings on fire. Following this operation, on June 15, a certain number of the German seaplanes landed on the island and destroyed the remaining parts of the Russian facility with explosives. The attackers met with no resistance and after completing their tasks all the aircraft have returned on their base.

== Aftermath ==
Ruhnu sabotage raid helped the Germans to gain another tactical advantage in the region. A mission carried by the aviators reaching the target area and then working as an infantry unit was probably the first of its kind. On 1 September 1917 a 1917 Riga Offensive was launched and five days after German armies captured the port city.

On 13 October 1917 Runhu Island was attacked for the third time in the war. German troops invaded and occupied the island of Ruhnu as a supportive action of the Operation Albion, German landing in Estonian Sarreema Island. Some Estonian sources claim, that the operation was proceeded by eight German seaplanes and it was probably the first air-landed ambush mission in the history of warfare.

== See also ==
- Ruhnu
- History of Estonia
- Riga offensive (1917)

== Bibliography ==
- Õun, Mati (2011). Võitlused Läänemerel 1914–1918 : Esimene maailmasõda koduvetes (Saku: Rebellis ed.). Tallinn: Olion. ISBN 9789985666616.
