= First Battle of Jaunde =

Coordinates: 03°52′N 11°31′E

- Part of the Kamerun campaign in World War I
Date	1 May – late June 1915
Location	Area around Jaunde, German Kamerun
Result	German victory

Belligerents
(United Kingdom of Great Britain and Ireland) British Empire: British Nigeria; (French Third Republic) France: (French Third Republic) French Equatorial Africa	(German Empire) Germany: German Kamerun

The First Battle of Jaunde involved the attempted British and French assault on the German capital of Jaunde during the Kamerun campaign of the First World War. Due to a lack of coordination, difficult terrain, adverse weather conditions, and stiff German resistance, the attack was forced to retreat in late June 1915. Another assault on the capital would not be conducted until later that year.
