= Timeline of World War I =

This is a list of the events of World War I in chronological order.

== 1914 ==
Dates	Theater/Front/Campaign	Events
June 28	Politics	Assassination of Archduke Franz Ferdinand, heir to the Austro-Hungarian throne, who was killed in Sarajevo along with his wife Duchess Sophie Chotek, by Gavrilo Princip, a Bosnian Serb nationalist.
July 6	Politics	Austria-Hungary seeks German support for a war against Serbia in case of Russian military intervention. The German Empire gives assurances of support.
July 23	Politics	Beginning of the "Black Week". The Austro-Hungarian Empire sends an ultimatum to the Kingdom of Serbia. Serbia responds that night, agreeing to most but not all terms of the ultimatum. The Serbian response is seen as satisfactory by Kaiser Wilhelm II, but German diplomats do not pressure Austria to make peace. (details)
July 24	Balkan	Serbia mobilizes, expecting Austria to declare war after the refusal of the ultimatum.
July 25	Eastern	Austria mobilizes against Serbia. Russia enters the period preparatory to war (partial mobilization).
July 28	Politics	To my peoples. Austria-Hungary declares war on Serbia.
July 29	Politics	Willy–Nicky correspondence. Kaiser Wilhelm II of Germany and Tsar Nicholas II of Russia communicate via telegram.
July 30	Politics	Germany sends Russia an ultimatum.
July 31	Politics	Sweden announces neutrality in the conflict between Austria-Hungary and Serbia.
July 31	Politics	Russia mobilizes for war.
July–August	Politics	1914 Dashnak Congress, Armenian Revolutionary Federation refuses Committee of Union and Progress demands to encourage Armenian revolts in the Russian Empire
August 1	Politics	Germany declares war on Russia and mobilizes.
August 1	Western	France mobilizes.
August 1	Politics	Italy declares its neutrality.
August 1	Politics	The German–Ottoman alliance. Germany and the Ottoman Empire sign a secret alliance treaty.
August 2	Western	Germany invades Luxembourg. Grand Duchess Marie-Adélaïde remains in the country, choosing not to flee into exile. (details)
August 2	Western	Skirmish at Joncherey, first military action on the Western Front.
August 2 – 26	Western	Germany besieges and captures fortified Longwy, "the Iron Gate to Paris,", near the Luxembourg border, opening France to mass German invasion.
August 3	Politics	Germany declares war on France. Belgium denies permission for German forces to pass through to the French border.
August 3	Politics	Switzerland declares its neutrality and mobilises for defence purposes.
August 3	Politics	Sweden declares neutrality in the conflict between Germany, Russia and France.
August 4	Western	Schlieffen Plan. The Germans invade Belgium to outflank the French army, carrying out a series of systematic war crimes.
August 4	Politics	The United Kingdom protests against the violation of Belgian neutrality, guaranteed by the Treaty of London (1839). The German Chancellor replies that the treaty is just a chiffon de papier (a scrap of paper). The United Kingdom declares war on Germany, automatically including all dominions, colonies, etc. of the British Empire including Canada, Australia, New Zealand, Newfoundland, South Africa, and British India. (details)
August 4	Politics	The United States declares neutrality.
August 5 – 16	Western	Battle of Liège. The Germans besiege and then capture the fortresses of Liège, Belgium.
August 5	Asian and Pacific	First weapon fired in Melbourne, Australia, by Australian troops.
August 5	Asian and Pacific	German Steamer SS Pfalz surrenders after being fired on by Fort Nepean, south of Melbourne, Australia. (details)
August 5	Politics	Montenegro declares war on Austria-Hungary.
August 5	Middle Eastern	The Ottoman Empire closes the Dardanelles.
August 6	Politics	Austria-Hungary declares war on Russia.
August 6	Politics	Serbia declares war on Germany.
August 7
August 7	Politics	Spain declares "the strictest neutrality." (details)
August 7 – September 6	Western	Battle of the Frontiers. The Germans obtain a victory against the British Expeditionary Force and France's Fifth Army.
August 7 – 10	Western	Battle of Mulhouse, a phase of the Battle of the Frontiers.
August 8	Politics	Montenegro declares war on Germany.
August 8	Politics	Sweden and Norway declare neutrality in the general conflict.
August 9	African, Togoland	The Togoland campaign begins.
August 11	Politics	France declares war on Austria-Hungary.
August 12	Politics	The United Kingdom declares war on Austria-Hungary.
August 12	Western	Battle of Halen, a phase of the Battle of the Frontiers.
August 14 – 25	Western	Battle of Lorraine, a phase of the Battle of the Frontiers.
August 14 – 24	Western	Battle of Dinant, during the German invasion of Belgium. Including Sack of Dinant (August 23).
August 15	African, East African	German troops cross into British East Africa and occupy Taveta. (details)
August 15 – 24	Balkan, Serbian	The Serbs defeat the Austro-Hungarians at the Battle of Cer.
August 17	Eastern	Battle of Stallupönen. The Russian army enters East Prussia.
August 20	Eastern	The Germans attack the Russians in East Prussia at the Battle of Gumbinnen. The attack is a failure in addition to being a deviation from the Schlieffen Plan.
August 20	Western	The Germans occupy Brussels. (details).
August 20	Western	Battle of Morhange-Sarrebourg, a phase of the Battle of Lorraine.
August 21 – 23	Western	Battle of Charleroi, a phase of the Battle of the Frontiers.
August 21 – 23	Western	Battle of the Ardennes, a phase of the Battle of the Frontiers.
August 23	Politics	Japan declares war on Germany. (details)
August 23	Western	Battle of Mons, a phase of the Battle of the Frontiers.
August 23 – 30	Eastern	Battle of Tannenberg: the Russian army undergoes a heavy defeat by the Germans.
August 23 – September 11	Eastern	Battle of Galicia. The Russians capture Lviv.
August 23 – 25	Eastern	Battle of Kraśnik, a phase of the Battle of Lemberg. The Austro-Hungarian First Army defeats the Russian Fourth Army.
August 24 – 26	Western	Action of Elouges
August 24 – 26	Western	Battle of the Trouée de Charmes, a phase of the Battle of Lorraine.
August 24 – September 7	Western	Siege of Maubeuge. The Germans besiege and capture the Maubeuge Fortress.
August 24 – September 5	Western	The Allies retreat to the Marne.
August 25	Politics	Japan declares war on Austria-Hungary.
August 25	African, Kamerun	Battle of Tepe: The Kamerun campaign begins.
August 26	African, Togoland	British and French forces conquer Togoland, a German protectorate in West Africa. (details)
August 26	Western	Rearguard Affair of Le Grand Fayt
August 26	Western	Battle of Le Cateau results in an Allied retreat.
August 26 – 30	Eastern	Battle of Gnila Lipa, a phase of the Battle of Lemberg.
August 26 – September 2	Eastern	Battle of Komarow, part of the Battle of Lemberg.
August 26, 1914 – February 18, 1916	African, Kamerun	Siege of Mora
August 27	Western	Rearguard Affair of Étreux
August 27 – November 7	Asian and Pacific	Siege of Tsingtao: British and Japanese forces capture the German-controlled port of Qingdao in China.
August 28	Naval	The Royal Navy wins the First Battle of Heligoland Bight in the North Sea.
August 28	Politics	Austria-Hungary declares war on Belgium.
August 29 – 30	Western	Battle of St. Quentin, also known as Battle of Guise. Orderly Allied retreat.
August 29 – 31	African, Kamerun	First Battle of Garua
August 29 – 30	Asian and Pacific	New Zealand occupies German Samoa. (details).
September 1	Western	Affair of Néry
September 1	Politics	Saint Petersburg renamed Petrograd, removing German words "Burg" and "Sankt."
September 3 – 11	Eastern	Austro-Hungarian defeat at the Battle of Rawa, a phase of the Battle of Lemberg.
September 5	Naval, Atlantic	British scout cruiser HMS Pathfinder is sunk by German U-boat SM U-21 off Scotland.
September 5–12	Western	First Battle of the Marne. The German advance on Paris is halted, marking the failure of the Schlieffen Plan.
September 5–12	Western	Battle of the Ourcq, a phase of the First Battle of the Marne.
September 5–12	Western	Battle of the Two Morins
September 6	African, Kamerun	Battle of Nsanakong
September 6–12	Western	Battle of the Marshes of Saint-Gond, a phase of the First Battle of the Marne.
September 6–12	Western	Battle of Vitry, a phase of the First Battle of the Marne.
September 6–12	Western	Battle of Revigny, a phase of the First Battle of the Marne.
September 7 – September 24	Balkan, Serbian	Battle of the Drina
September 7	Asian and Pacific	Fanning Raid
September 7–14	Eastern	First Battle of the Masurian Lakes: The Russian Army of the Neman withdraws from East Prussia with heavy casualties.
September 9	Politics	Theobald von Bethmann Hollweg lays out Germany's war aims. (details).
September 11	Asian and Pacific	Battle of Bita Paka
September 13	African, South West Africa	South West Africa campaign. Troops from South Africa begin invading German South West Africa.
September 13–28	Western	The First Battle of the Aisne ends in a substantial draw. The Race to the Sea begins.
September 14	Politics	Erich von Falkenhayn replaces Helmuth von Moltke the Younger as German Chief of Staff.
September 14–17	Asian and Pacific	Siege of Toma. Most German forces in German New Guinea surrender to the Australians then or over the following year.
September 15, 1914 - Feb 4, 1915	African, South West Africa	Maritz rebellion. Boer leader Manie Maritz revolts in South Africa.
September 19 – October 11	Western	Battle of Flirey
September 20	Naval, African, East African	Battle of Zanzibar, German naval victory.
September 22	Asian and Pacific	Bombardment of Papeete
September 22	Asian and Pacific	Bombardment of Madras. German light cruiser SMS Emden attacks Chennai.
September 22–26	Western	First Battle of Picardy
September 24	Eastern	The Siege of Przemyśl begins.
September 26	African, South West Africa	Battle of Sandfontein
September 25–29	Western	First Battle of Albert
September 28 – October 10	Western	Siege of Antwerp. The Germans besiege and capture Antwerp, Belgium.
September 29–30	Asian and Pacific	Japan occupies the Marshall Islands.
September 29 – October 31	Eastern	Battle of the Vistula River, also known as Battle of Warsaw.
October 1914 – July 11, 1915	Naval, African, East African	Battle of Rufiji Delta, German cruiser SMS Königsberg destroyed.
October 1–4	Western	First Battle of Arras
October 9 – November 1	Balkan, Serbian	The Central Powers occupy Belgrade. (details)
October 10 – November 2	Western	Battle of La Bassée
October 12 – November 2	Western	First Battle of Messines
October 13 – November 2	Western	Battle of Armentières
October 16–31	Western	Battle of the Yser. French and Belgian forces secure the coastline of Belgium.
October 19 – November 22	Western	The First Battle of Ypres ends the Race to the Sea. The Germans are prevented from reaching Calais and Dunkirk.
October 18, 1914 – July 9, 1915	African, South West Africa	German campaign in Angola. Clashes between German and Portuguese forces in the Portuguese Angola-German South West Africa border, without declaration of war.
October 28	Naval, Asian and Pacific	Battle of Penang. The German cruiser Emden sinks two British warships in the Strait of Malacca.
October 29	Naval, Eastern	Black Sea raid. Ottoman warships bombard the Russian ports of Odessa and Sevastopol.
November 1	Politics	The Russian Empire declares war on the Ottoman Empire.
November 1	Naval	Battle of Coronel. Maximilian von Spee's German cruiser squadron defeats a Royal Navy squadron under Christopher Cradock off the coast of Chile.
November 2	Naval, Atlantic	The United Kingdom begins the naval blockade of Germany. (details)
November 2	Politics	Serbia declares war on the Ottoman Empire.
November 2–21	Middle Eastern, Caucasian	Bergmann Offensive, first military engagement in the Caucasus of the war.
November 3	Politics	Montenegro declares war on the Ottoman Empire.
November 3	African, East African	Battle of Kilimanjaro
November 3–5	African, East African	Paul Von Lettow-Vorbeck's German colonial forces defeat the British at the Battle of Tanga, German East Africa.
November 5	Politics	France and the United Kingdom declare war on the Ottoman Empire.
November 6–8	Middle Eastern, Mesopotamian	Fao Landing, British and Indian forces besiege the fortress at Fao.
November 7	Asian and Pacific	Japanese Forces capture the Naval Base at Tsingtao. (details)
November 11	Politics	Sultan Mehmed V declares Jihad on the Allies.
November 11–22	Middle Eastern, Mesopotamian	Battle of Basra
November 11 – December 6	Eastern	Battle of Łódź, also known as Silesian offensive.
November 13	African, East African	Battle of El Herri: Worst French defeat in Morocco at the hands of the Zayanes.
November 16 – December 15	Balkan, Serbian	Battle of Kolubara, Austria-Hungary withdraws from Serbia.
November 19	Politics	Bolshevik representatives at the State Duma arrested and exiled to Siberia.
November 23	Middle Eastern, Mesopotamian	Basra is occupied by the British.
December 1 – 13	Eastern	Battle of Limanowa
December 3 – 9	Middle Eastern, Mesopotamian	Battle of Qurna
December 8	Naval	Battle of the Falkland Islands. Von Spee's German cruiser squadron is defeated by the Royal Navy.
December 10	Western	Hill 60, in Ypres, captured by the Germans.
December 14	Middle Eastern, Persian	Persian campaign. Ottomans occupy the Persian border town of Qatur as a bridgehead to the Caucasus, but withdraw after their defeat at Sarikamish.
December 16	Naval, Atlantic	Raid on Scarborough, Hartlepool and Whitby. The German fleet shells Scarborough, North Yorkshire, Hartlepool, and Whitby England.
December 18–19	Politics	Kings Christian X, Gustaf V, and Haakon VII meet at Malmö to discuss neutrality, which leads to Denmark joining Sweden and Norway in neutrality.
December 18 – 22	Western	Battle of Givenchy
December 17, 1914 – January 13, 1915	Western	First Battle of Artois
December 20	Western	Fighting begins at Perthes, Ardennes.
December 20, 1914 – 17 March 1915	Western	First Battle of Champagne
December 22	Western	Fighting begins at Noyon.
December 22, 1914 – January 17, 1915	Middle Eastern, Caucasian	The Russians win the Battle of Sarikamish.
December 24 – 26	Western	In some sectors of the Western Front, an unofficial Christmas truce is observed between German and British forces.
December 25 – January 18, 1915	Middle Eastern, Caucasian	Battle of Ardahan

== 1915 ==
Dates	Theater/Front/Campaign	Events
January 2	Eastern	The Russian offensive in the Carpathians begins. It will continue until April 12.
January 4–11	Middle Eastern, Persian	Ottomans occupy Urmia and Tabriz by surprise.
January 18	Politics	Japan attempts to impose its Twenty-One Demands on neutral China.
January 18–19	African, East African	Battle of Jassin.
Januart 19–20	Western	First Zeppelin air raid on Britain. German airships bomb the coastal towns of Great Yarmouth and King's Lynn in England, marking the first aerial bombardment of civilians in the British Isles.
January 19 – December 22	Western	Battle of Hartmannswillerkopf, series of battles fought to control the peak.
January 24	Naval	Battle of Dogger Bank between squadrons of the British Grand Fleet and the German Hochseeflotte.
January 24–26	African, East African	Chilembwe uprising led by John Chilembwe in British Nyasaland.
January 28 – February 3	Middle Eastern, Sinai and Palestine	The Ottomans fail to capture the Suez Canal in the First Suez Offensive.
January 30	Middle Eastern, Persian	The Russians take Tabriz.
January 31	Eastern	Battle of Bolimov. First German use of chemical weapons.
February 4	Naval, Atlantic	Germany begins unrestricted submarine warfare against merchant vessels.
February 4	African, South West Africa	Jan Kemp surrenders. End of the Maritz Rebellion.
February 4	African, South West Africa	Battle of Kakamas: German invasion of South Africa repelled.
February 7–22	Eastern	Second Battle of the Masurian Lakes. The Russian X Army is defeated.
February 15	Asian and Pacific	Troops in Singapore mutiny against the British colonial rule.
February 19	Middle Eastern, Gallipoli	British and French naval attack on the Dardanelles. The Gallipoli Campaign begins.
March 5	Politics	Great Britain and France promise Russia Constantinople.
March 7	Middle Eastern, Persian	Ottomans retreat to Qotur, pushed by a Russian counteroffensive.
March 10 – March 13	Western	Battle of Neuve Chapelle. After an initial success, a British offensive is halted.
March 14	Naval	Battle of Más a Tierra. The last remnant of the German East Asia Squadron is sunk and its crew interned in neutral Chile.
March 18	Naval, Middle Eastern, Gallipoli	Battle of 18 March. The British and French unsuccessfully try to force the Dardanelles, losing 3 Pre-Dreadnought Battleships
March 22	Eastern	The Siege of Przemyśl ends. The Russians capture the fortress.
April 5 – May 5	Western	First Battle of Woevre.
April 12–14	Middle Eastern, Mesopotamian	Battle of Shaiba.
April 15	Middle Eastern, Persian	Battle of Dilman
April 19 – May 17	Middle Eastern, Caucasian	The Ottomans besiege the Armenian city of Van.
April 22 – May 25	Western	The Second Battle of Ypres, which ends in a stalemate. Germany first uses poison gas.
April 22–23	Western	Battle of Gravenstafel, First stage of the Second Battle of Ypres.
April 24	Politics	Banning of Armenian political organizations in the Ottoman Empire. Deportation of Armenian intellectuals of Constantinople, first act of the Armenian genocide.
April 24 – May 5	Western	Battle of St Julien, part of the Second Battle of Ypres.
April 25	Middle Eastern, Gallipoli	Allied forces land on Gallipoli, landing at Ari Burnu, soon renamed Anzac Cove, and Cape Helles. (details)
April 26	Politics	Treaty of London between the Entente and the Kingdom of Italy.
April 26	African, South West Africa	Battle of Trekkopjes.
April 28	Middle Eastern, Gallipoli	First Battle of Krithia. The Allied advance is repelled.
April 29	African, Kamerun	Battle of Gurin.
May 1	Eastern	The Gorlice-Tarnów Offensive begins: the German troops under General August von Mackensen break through the Russian lines in Galicia.
May 1	Middle Eastern, Gallipoli	Battle of Eski Hissarlik.
May 3	Middle Eastern, Gallipoli	Troops withdraw from Anzac Cove.
May 3	Politics	Italy revokes its commitment to a defensive alliance with Germany and Austria-Hungary.
May 6–8	Middle Eastern, Gallipoli	Second Battle of Krithia. The Allied attempts at advancing are thwarted again.
May 7	Naval, Atlantic	The British liner Lusitania is sunk by a German U-boat. (details).
May 8–13	Western	Battle of Frezenberg Ridge, Part of the Second Battle of Ypres.
May 9	Western	Beginning of the Second Battle of Artois, with the Battle of Aubers
May 10	Eastern	Hungarian troops rout the Russians at Jarosław. Lviv is again in Austrian hands.
May 11	Middle Eastern, Gallipoli	Armistice called at Gallipoli to bury the dead. (details)
May 12	African, South West Africa	Windhoek, capital of German South-West Africa, is occupied by South African troops.
May 15–25	Western	Battle of Festubert.
May 16 – June 23	Eastern	Battle of Konary.
May 23	Politics	Italy declares war on Austria-Hungary. (details)
May 24–25	Western	Battle of Bellewaarde, final phase of the Second Battle of Ypres.
May 31 – June 10	African, Kamerun	Second Battle of Garua.
June–September	Eastern	The Russian Great Retreat from Poland and Galicia.
June 4	Middle Eastern, Gallipoli	Third Battle of Krithia. Yet another Allied failure.
June 4	Eastern	The Russians leave Przemyśl. (details)
June 21–23	African, East African	Battle of Bukoba.
June 22	Eastern	Mackensen again breaks through the Russian lines in the Lviv area. (details)
June 23 – July 7	Italian	First Battle of the Isonzo.
June 27	Eastern	The Austro-Hungarians re-enter Lviv. (details)
June 28 – July 5	Middle Eastern, Gallipoli	The British win the Battle of Gully Ravine.
June 29	African, Kamerun	Battle of Ngaundere
July 1	Air	First aerial victory by a synchronized gun-armed fighter aircraft (details)
July 1	African, South West Africa	Battle of Otavi.
July 9	African, South West Africa	The German forces in South West Africa surrender.
July 10–26	Middle Eastern, Caucasian	Battle of Manzikert.
July 18 – August 3	Italian	Second Battle of the Isonzo.
July 25	Italian	Italians capture Cappuccio Wood. (details)
July 25	Air	First Victoria Cross awarded to a British combat pilot (details)
July 27–31	Middle Eastern, Caucasian	Battle of Kara Killisse.
August 5	Eastern	The Germans occupy Warsaw. (details)
August 6–10	Middle Eastern, Gallipoli	Battle of Lone Pine, part of the August Offensive.
August 6–13	Middle Eastern, Gallipoli	Battle of Krithia Vineyard, part of the August Offensive.
August 6–15	Middle Eastern, Gallipoli	Allies land at Suvla Bay, a phase of the August Offensive.
August 6–21	Middle Eastern, Gallipoli	Battle of Sari Bair, part of the August Offensive. Last and unsuccessful attempt by the British to seize the Gallipoli peninsula.
August 7	Middle Eastern, Gallipoli	Battle of the Nek, a phase of the August Offensive.
August 7–19	Middle Eastern, Gallipoli	Battle of Chunuk Bair, a phase of the August Offensive.
August 19	Naval, Atlantic	A German U-boat sinks the liner SS Arabic. 44 died including 3 Americans.
August 21	Middle Eastern, Gallipoli	Scimitar Hill, a phase of the August Offensive.
August 21	Politics	Italy declares war on the Ottoman Empire.
August 21–29	Middle Eastern, Gallipoli	Battle of Hill 60, part of the August Offensive.
August 26 – September 19	Eastern	Sventiany Offensive, a phase of the Gorlice-Tarnow Offensive.
September 1	Naval, Atlantic	Germany suspends unrestricted submarine warfare. (details)
September 5–8	Politics	The Zimmerwald Conference of anti-militarist European socialist parties is held in Zimmerwald, Switzerland.
September 5	Eastern	Tsar Nicholas II removes Grand Duke Nicholas Nikolayevich as Commander-in-Chief of the Russian Army, personally taking that position.
September 15 – November 4	Western	Third Battle of Artois.
September 19	Eastern	The Germans occupy Vilnius. The Gorlice-Tarnów Offensive ends.
September 25–28	Western	Battle of Loos, a major British offensive, fails.
September 25 – October 15	Western	Battle of the Hohenzollern Redoubt, a phase of the Battle of Loos.
September 25 – November 6	Western	Second Battle of Champagne.
September 28	Middle Eastern, Mesopotamian	Battle of Es Sinn.
October 3	Balkan, Macedonian	Allies land troops at Salonika in Greece to aid Serbia.
October 7 – December 4	Balkan, Serbian	Serbia is invaded by Germany, Austria-Hungary, and Bulgaria.
October 12	Politics	British nurse Edith Cavell is sentenced and executed by firing squad in Brussels by the Germans for helping Allied soldiers escape Belgium.
October 14	Politics	Bulgaria declares war on Serbia (details)
October 14 – November 9	Balkan, Serbian	Morava Offensive, a phase of the Central Powers Invasion of Serbia, Bulgarians break through Serbian lines.
October 14 – November 15	Balkan, Serbian	Ovche Pole Offensive, a phase of the Central Powers invasion of Serbia, Bulgarians break through Serbian lines.
October 15	Politics	The United Kingdom declares war on Bulgaria.
October 15	Politics	Montenegro declares war on Bulgaria.
October 16	Politics	France declares war on Bulgaria.
October 17 – November 21	Balkan, Macedonian	Battle of Krivolak, first of the Salonika front.
October 18 – November 4	Italian	Third Battle of the Isonzo
October 19	Politics	Italy and Russia declare war on Bulgaria.
October 27	Politics	Andrew Fisher resigns as Prime Minister of Australia; he is replaced by Billy Hughes.
October 29	Politics	René Viviani resigns as Prime Minister of France; he is replaced by Aristide Briand.
November 4–6	African, Kamerun	Battle of Banjo.
November 10	Middle Eastern, Persian	Pro-Central Powers Persiana seize Shiraz from pro-Entente forces and arrest all British citizens in the city.
November 10 – December 2	Italian	Fourth Battle of the Isonzo
November 10 – December 4	Balkan, Serbian	Kosovo Offensive, a phase of the Central Powers invasion of Serbia, Serbians pushed into Albania.
November 14–30	Middle Eastern, Persian	Russian forces from the Caucasus occupy Tehran.
November 17	African, North African	Armed by Ottomans and Germans, the Senussi cross the Libyan border and attack Egypt from the west. (details)
November 22–25	Middle Eastern, Mesopotamian	Battle of Ctesiphon.
November 27	Balkan, Serbian	The Serbian army collapses. It will retreat to the Adriatic Sea and be evacuated by the Italian and French Navies. (details)
December – July, 1916	Naval, African, East African	Battle of Lake Tanganyika.
December 6–12	Balkan, Macedonian	Battle of Kosturino
December 7	Middle Eastern, Mesopotamian	The First Siege of Kut, by the Ottomans begins.
December 15	Middle Eastern, Persian	Russians occupy Hamadan.
December 18	Middle Eastern, Gallipoli	Gallipoli evacuations, a major Ottoman victory and a "disaster for the Allies."
December 19	Western	Douglas Haig replaces John French as commander of the British Expeditionary Force.
December 23	African, Kamerun	General Carl Heinrich Zimmermann orders the retreat of all German forces and civilians in Kamerun to the Spanish colony of Guinea.

== 1916 ==
Dates	Theater/Front/Campaign	Events
January 5–17	Balkan	Austro-Hungarian offensive against Montenegro, which capitulates on January 23 and is occupied by Austria-Hungary. (details)
January 6–7	Balkan	Battle of Mojkovac
January 6–8	Middle Eastern	Battle of Sheikh Sa'ad, a phase of the first siege of Kut
January 9	Gallipoli	The Gallipoli Campaign ends in an Allied defeat and an Ottoman victory. (details)
January 10 – February 16	Caucasian	Battle of Erzurum
January 11	Balkan	Corfu occupied by the Allies. (details)
January 13	Middle Eastern	Battle of Wadi, a phase of the first siege of Kut. (details)
January 21	Middle Eastern	Battle of Hanna, a phase of the first siege of Kut
January 24	Naval	Reinhard Scheer is appointed commander of Germany's Hochseeflotte. (details)
January 27	Politics	Conscription introduced in the United Kingdom by the Military Service Act 1916. (details)
February 5 – April 15	Caucasian	Trebizond Campaign.
February 12	African	Battle of Salaita Hill.
February 21	Western	The Battle of Verdun begins.
February 26	African, North African	Battle of Agagia: Senussi rebellion suppressed by the British.
February 28	African	German Kamerun surrenders. (details)
March 1	Naval	Germany resumes unrestricted submarine warfare. (details)
March 1–15	Italian	Fifth Battle of the Isonzo.
March 2 – August 4	Caucasian	Battle of Bitlis.
March 8	Middle Eastern	Battle of Dujaila: a British attempt to relieve Kut failed. (details)
March 9	Politics	Germany declares war on Portugal. Portugal officially enters the war. (details)
March 11–12	African	Battle of Latema Nek.
March 14	Politics	The Manifesto of the Sixteen, declaring Kropotkinist-anarchist support of the Allied war effort, is published. (details)
March 15	Politics	Austria-Hungary declares war on Portugal.
March 16 – November 6	African	British preemptively invade the Sultanate of Darfur and annex it to the Anglo-Egyptian Sudan. (details)
March 18	African	Battle of Kahe.
March 18 – April	Eastern	Lake Naroch Offensive.
April 24–29	Politics	Easter Rising by Irish rebels for independence from the British. (details)
April 24–30	Politics	The Kienthal Conference, the second meeting of the anti-war socialist Zimmerwald Movement, is held in Kienthal, Switzerland. (details)
April 27–29	Western	Gas attacks at Hulluch.
April 29	Middle Eastern	The British forces under siege at Kut surrender to the Ottomans, first siege of Kut ends. (details)
May 7–10	African	Battle of Kondoa Irangi.
May 10	Naval	Germany suspends unrestricted submarine warfare. (details)
May 15 – June 10	Italian	Austro-Hungarian Strafexpedition in Trentino. (details)
May 16	Politics	Signing of the Sykes-Picot Agreement between the United Kingdom and France defining their proposed spheres in the Middle East. (details)
May 18	Middle Eastern	Russian forces in Persia link up with the British in Mesopotamia, but it is too late. (details)
May 21–22	Western	German attack on Vimy Ridge.
May 31 – June 1	Naval	Battle of Jutland between Britain's Grand Fleet and Germany's Hochseeflotte. (details)
June 2–14	Western	Battle of Mont Sorrel.
June 3	Middle Eastern	Russians fail to encircle Ottoman forces in Persia. (details)
June 4	Eastern	The Brusilov Offensive begins.
June 5	Middle Eastern	The Arab Revolt in Hejaz begins.
June 5	Naval	HMS Hampshire is sunk off the Orkney Islands; Lord Kitchener dies. (details)
June 8	Naval	In the Adriatic Sea the Italian troopship SS Principe Umberto is sunk by an Austro-Hungarian submarine. It is the deadliest sinking of the war, with 1,900 lives lost.
June 10	Politics	Paolo Boselli succeeds Antonio Salandra as Prime Minister of Italy.
June 10	Middle Eastern	The Siege of Medina begins.
June 10 – July 4	Middle Eastern	Battle of Mecca, Arabs capture the city. (details)
June 12	Middle Eastern	Percy Sykes marches on Kerman to link up with the Russian forces in central-northern Persia.
June 30	Western	Battle of the Boar's Head, diversion from the Battle of the Somme which began the next day.
July	Middle Eastern	Battle of Taif. (details)
July 1	Western	The Battle of the Somme begins. (details)
July 1–3	Politics	The Social Democratic Party wins a majority in the parliament of the Russian-ruled Grand Duchy of Finland. (details)
July 1–13	Western	Second Battle of Albert. Opening phase of the Battle of the Somme. (details)
July 1–2	Western	British capture Fricourt during the Second Battle of Albert. (details)
July 2	Middle Eastern	Ottoman counter-attack into Persia reaches Kermanshah. (details)
July 2–25	Caucasian	Battle of Erzincan.
July 3–7	Western	British capture La Boisselle during the Second Battle of Albert. (details)
July 3–12	Western	British capture Mametz Wood during the Second Battle of Albert. (details)
July 3–17	Western	British capture Ovillers during the Second Battle of Albert and Battle of Bazentin Ridge. (details)
July 4–6	Eastern	Battle of Kostiuchnowka.
July 7–11	Western	British capture Contalmaison during the Second Battle of Albert. (details)
July 8–14	Western	British capture Trônes Wood during the Second Battle of Albert. (details)
July 14–17	Western	Battle of Bazentin Ridge. Initial phase of the Battle of the Somme. (details)
July 14 – September 15	Western	Battles for Longueval and Delville Wood. Initial phase of the Battle of the Somme. (details)
July 19–20	Western	Battle of Fromelles. Initial phase of the Battle of the Somme.
July 23 – August 7	Western	Battle of Pozières. Initial phase of the Battle of the Somme. (details)
July 28 – August 8	Eastern	Battle of Kowel.
July 30		German agents sabotage munition factories in Jersey City that supply the Allies, causing the Black Tom explosion.
August 3–5	Middle Eastern	Battle of Romani. Ottoman attack on the British in the Sinai peninsula fails. (details)
August 6–17	Italian	Sixth Battle of the Isonzo. On August 9, the Italians capture Gorizia. (details)
August 6	Italian	Battle of Doberdo, part of the Sixth Battle of Isonzo.
August 9–18	Balkan	First battle of Doiran. (details)
August 10	Middle Eastern	Ottomans take Hamadan. (details)
August 24	African	Battle of Mlali.
August 27	Balkan	Romania enters the war on the Entente's side, but their army is defeated in a few weeks.
August 27 – December	Balkan	Occupation of Romania by the Central Powers. (details)
August 27 – November 26	Balkan	Battle of Transylvania, a phase of the conquest of Romania.
August 28	Politics	Italy declares war on Germany.
August 29	Politics	Paul von Hindenburg replaces Erich von Falkenhayn as German Chief of Staff. (details)
August 30	Politics	The Ottoman Empire declares war on Romania.
September 1	Politics	Bulgaria declares war on Romania.
September 2–6	Balkan	Battle of Turtucaia, a phase of the conquest of Romania.
September 3–6	Western	Battle of Guillemont. Intermediate phase of the Battle of the Somme. (details)
September 5–7	Balkan	Battle of Dobrich, a phase of the conquest of Romania.
September 6	Politics	The Central Powers create a unified command.
September 7–11	African	Battle of Kisaki.
September 8–19	African	Battle of Tabora.
September 9	Western	Battle of Ginchy. Intermediate phase of the Battle of the Somme. (details)
September 9–11	African	Battle of Dutumi.
September 12 – December 11	Balkan	Monastir Offensive, set up of the Salonika front.
September 12–14	Balkan	Battle of Malka Nidzhe, a phase of the Monastir Offensive.
September 12–30	Balkan	Battle of Kaymakchalan, a phase of the Monastir Offensive.
September 14–17	Italian	Seventh Battle of the Isonzo
September 15–22	Western	Battle of Flers-Courcelette; the British use armoured tanks for the first time in history. (details)
September 17–19	Balkan	First Battle of Cobadin, a phase of the conquest of Romania.
September 20	Eastern	The Brusilov Offensive ends with a substantial Russian success. (details)
September 25–28	Western	Battle of Morval. Part of the final stages of the Battle of the Somme. (details)
September 26–28	Western	Battle of Thiepval Ridge. Part of the final stages of the Battle of the Somme. (details)
September 29 – October 5	Balkan	Flamanda Offensive, a phase of the conquest of Romania.
October–November	Balkan	First Battle of the Cerna Bend, a phase of the Monastir Offensive. (details)
October 1 – November 5	Western	Battle of Le Transloy. Last stage of the Battle of the Somme. (details)
October 1 – November 11	Western	Battle of Ancre Heights. Last stage of the Battle of the Somme.
October 9–12	Italian	Eighth Battle of the Isonzo.
October 14 – January 6, 1917	African	Battle of Kibata.
October 19–25	Balkan	Second Battle of Cobadin, a phase of the conquest of Romania.
October 24	Western	The French recapture Fort Douaumont near Verdun. (details)
November 1–4	Italian	Ninth Battle of the Isonzo.
November 11	African	Battle of Matamondo.
November 13–18	Western	Battle of the Ancre. Closing phase of the Battle of the Somme. (details)
November 18	Western	The Battle of the Somme ends with enormous casualties and an Anglo-French advantage. (details)
November 21	Naval	HMHS Britannic sinks after hitting a German mine, becoming the largest ship lost during the conflict. (details)
November 21	Politics	Franz Joseph I, Emperor of Austria and King of Hungary. His grand-nephew Karl I succeeds him. (details)
November 25	Naval	David Beatty replaces John Jellicoe as commander of the Grand Fleet. Jellicoe becomes First Lord of the Sea. (details)
November 25 – December 3	Balkan	Battle of Bucharest, a phase of the conquest of Romania.
November 28	Balkan	Prunaru Charge, a phase of the Battle of Bucharest, Romanian cavalry desperately charges into enemy lines.
December 1	Balkan	Battle of the Arges, a phase of the Battle of Bucharest.
December 1 – January 18, 1917	Middle Eastern	Allies capture Yanbu. (details)
December 3–6	Politics	In a four-day crisis, British Prime Minister H. H. Asquith is unaware how fast he is losing support. David Lloyd George now has growing Unionist support, the backing of Labour and, thanks to Viscount Addison, a majority of Liberal MPs. Asquith falls and Lloyd George succeeds him. (details)
December 7–31	Politics	The new Prime Minister Lloyd George answers the loud demands for a much more decisive government. He energetically sets up a new small war cabinet, a cabinet secretariat under Maurice Hankey, a secretariat of private advisors in the 'Garden Suburb' and moved towards prime ministerial control. (details)
December 6	Balkan	The Germans occupy Bucharest. The capital of Romania is moved to Iaşi. (details)
December 13	Western	Robert Nivelle replaces Joseph Joffre as Commander-in-Chief of the French Army. (details)
December 17	African	Kaocen Revolt. The Tuareg besiege the French garrison at Agadez.
December 18	Western	Battle of Verdun ends with enormous casualties on both sides.
December 23	Middle Eastern	Battle of Magdhaba in the Sinai peninsula. (details)
December 23–29	Eastern	Christmas Battles.
December 27	African	German Togoland is divided into British and French administrative zones.
December 30	Politics	Russian mystic Grigori Rasputin, influential advisor and confidant of Tsarina Alexandra, is assassinated by Prince Felix Yusupov and his co-conspirators. (details).

== 1917 ==
Dates	Theater/Front/Campaign	Events
January 3–4	African	Battle of Behobeho.
January 9	Middle Eastern	Battle of Rafa. The British drive the Ottomans out of Sinai. (details)
January 11 – March 13	Western	British forces raid the Ancre. (details)
January 16	Politics	The German Foreign Secretary Arthur Zimmermann sends a telegram to his ambassador in Mexico, instructing him to propose an alliance against the United States to the Mexican government in exchange for recovering lost territories. Mexican President Venustiano Carranza would dismiss it due to the ongoing civil war. (details)
February 1	Naval	Germany resumes unrestricted submarine warfare. (details)
February 3	Naval	SS Housatonic an American steamer carrying wheat from Galveston, Texas to England is sunk by a U-boat.
February 4	Politics	Ottoman Grand Vizier Said Halim Pasha resigns for health reasons, Talât Bey succeeds him.
February 13	Politics	Dutch exotic dancer Mata Hari is arrested in Paris on charges of spying for the Germans.
February 21	Western	Sinking of the SS Mendi, a British troop ship carrying members of the South African Native Corps (SANLC), a group of native black South Africans recruited as non-combatants. It collided with a large cargo steamship in the English Channel.
February 23	Middle Eastern	Second Battle of Kut. The British recapture the city. (details)
February 23 – April 5	Western	The Germans withdraw to the Hindenburg Line.
March 1	Politics	Arz von Straussenburg replaces Conrad von Hötzendorf as Austro-Hungarian Chief of Staff.
March 3	African	The French retake Agadez.
March 8–11	Middle Eastern	The British capture Baghdad. (details)
March 8	Politics	The celebrations of International Women's Day in Petrograd spawn severe protests that will evolve into the February Revolution.
March 12	Politics	Russian troops refuse to fire on demonstrators after 50 are killed in Petrograd's Znamenskaya Square the day before. Numerous attacks against prisons, courts, police stations and Okhrana offices are carried out. The Provisional Committee of the Duma and the Petrograd Soviet are formed.
March 13	African	Battle of Nambanje.
March 13 – April 23	Middle Eastern	Samarra offensive, the British capture much of Mesopotamia.
March 14	Politics	China severs relations with Germany.
March 15	Politics	Tsar Nicholas II abdicates. The monarchy is abolished, ending more than 300 years of Romanov rule in Russia. A provisional government is formed.
March 16	Politics	Vladimir Lenin arrives in Petrograd by train from Germany after his exile in Switzerland and publishes his April Theses.
March 17	Politics	Aristide Briand resigns as Prime Minister of France; he is replaced by Alexandre Ribot.
March 26	Middle Eastern	First Battle of Gaza. The British fail to capture the city.
April–October	Middle Eastern	Stalemate in Southern Palestine.
April 2–3	Western	Australian troops attack Noreuil. (Details.)
April 6	Politics	The United States declares war on Germany. (details)
April 7	Politics	Cuba declares war on Germany.
April 7	Politics	Panama declares war on Germany.
April 7	Asian and Pacific	Scuttling of SMS Cormoran in Guam, the only hostile action between American and German forces in the Pacific.
April 9 – May 17	Western	Second Battle of Arras. The British attack a heavily fortified German line without obtaining any strategic breakthrough. (details)
April 9–12	Western	The Canadians obtain a significant victory in the Battle of Vimy Ridge, part of the first phase of the Second Battle of Arras. (details)
April 9–14	Western	First Battle of the Scarpe, part of the first phase of the Second Battle of Arras. (details)
April 10–11	Western	First Battle of Bullecourt, part of the first phase of the Second Battle of Arras. (details)
April 11	Politics	Brazil severs relations with Germany.
April 13	Politics	Bolivia severs relations with Germany.
April 15	Western	Battle of Lagnicourt, part of the Second phase of the Second Battle of Arras. (details)
April 16 – May 9	Western	The Second Battle of the Aisne, also known as Nivelle Offensive, ends in disaster for both the French army and its commander Robert Nivelle. (details)
April 17–20	Western	Battle of the Hills, also known as Third Battle of Champagne, a diversion to the Second Battle of the Aisne.
April 19	Middle Eastern	Second Battle of Gaza. The Ottoman lines resist a British attack. (details)
April 22 – May 8	Balkan	Second Battle of Doiran. (details)
April 23	Politics	The Ottoman Empire severs relations with the United States.
April 23–24	Western	Second Battle of Scarpe, part of the second phase of the Second Battle of Arras. (details)
April 28–29	Western	Battle of Arleux, part of the Second phase of the Second Battle of Arras. (details)
April 29 – May 20	Western	Series of mutinies in the French army in response to the disastrous Nivelle offensive. (details)
May 3–4	Western	Third battle of the Scarpe, part of the second phase of the Second Battle of Arras. (details)
May 3–4	Politics	Mass demonstrations in Petrograd and Moscow to protest Foreign Minister Pavel Milyukov's note affirming Russia's commitment to the Allied war effort. (details)
May 3–17	Western	Second Battle of Bullecourt, part of the second phase of the Second Battle of Arras. (details)
May 5	Politics	Australian Prime Minister Billy Hughes wins an enlarged majority in federal elections with the pro-conscription Nationalist Party. (details)
May 5–15	Balkan	Allied Spring offensive on the Salonika front.
May 5–9	Balkan	Second Battle of the Cerna Bend, a phase of the Allied Spring Offensive. (details)
May 12 – June 6	Italian	Tenth Battle of the Isonzo. (details)
May 15	Western	Philippe Pétain replaces Robert Nivelle as Commander-in-Chief of the French Army. (details)
May 23	Italian	Battle of Mount Hermada in the Karst.
May 23	Politics	Salonika Trial ends. Dragutin Dimitrijevic, chief conspirator of the assassination of Archduke Franz Ferdinand in Sarajevo, is sentenced to death by Serbia on trumped up charges, as part of negotiations for a peace treaty with Austria-Hungary.
June–October	Western	Operation Hush, Abortive British plan to capture the Belgian coast.
June 7–14	Western	Second Battle of Messines, the British blow 19 deep mines and recapture Messines Ridge. (details)
June 10–29	Italian	Battle of Mount Ortigara. (details)
June 12	Politics	King Constatine I of Greece abdicates, his second son Alexander succeeds him.
June 13	Air	First successful heavy bomber raid on London done by the Gotha G.IV.
June 25	Western	First American troops land in France. (details)
June 27	Western	Batterie Pommern aka. 'Lange Max', world's largest gun fires for the first time from Koekelare to Dunkirk (±50 km).
June 30	Politics	The Kingdom of Greece declares war on the Central Powers. (details)
July 1–2	Eastern	Battle of Zborov, a phase of the Kerensky Offensive. (details)
July 1–12	Politics	Attempted coup in China, allegedly promoted by Germany to distance China from the Entente. General Zhang Xun fails to restore the Qing Dynasty into power. (details)
July 1–19	Eastern	The Kerensky Offensive fails. It is the last Russian initiative in the war. (details)
July 6	Middle Eastern	Arab rebels led by Lawrence of Arabia seize the Jordanian port of Aqaba. (details)
July 11	Western	An open letter to King Albert I of Belgium is published by Flemish Movement sympathisers within the Belgian Army on the Yser Front, complaining about official discrimination against Dutch language (details)
July 16–17	Politics	July Days. Unrest in Petrograd characterised by spontaneous armed demonstrations by soldiers, sailors, and industrial workers against the Russian Provisional Government. The government blames the Bolsheviks and Leon Trotsky is arrested.
July 19	Politics	The Reichstag passes a Peace Resolution.
July 20	Politics	Corfu Declaration. The foundations are laid for the establishment of a future united Yugoslav state.
July 21	Politics	Alexander Kerensky replaces Georgy Lvov as Minister-President of the Russian Provisional Government.
July 22	Politics	The Kingdom of Siam declares war on Germany and Austria-Hungary.
July 22 – August 1	Balkan	Battle of Mărăști
July 29	African	Battle of Kiawe Bridge.
July 31	Western	The Third Battle of Ypres, also known as Battle of Passchendaele, begins. (details)
July 31 – August 2	Western	Battle of Pilckem Ridge, opening phase of the Third Battle of Ypres.
August 2	Asian and Pacific	The German raider SMS Seeadler is wrecked at Mopelia in French Polynesia.
August 2–10	African	Battle of Rumbo.
August 4	Politics	Liberia declares war on Germany.
August 6–20	Balkan	Battle of Mărăşeşti. (details)
August 8–22	Balkan	Third Battle of Oituz.
August 14	Politics	The Republic of China declares war on Germany and Austria-Hungary.
August 15–25	Western	Battle of Hill 70, continuation of British operations near Lens.
August 16–18	Western	Second Battle of Langemarck, initial phase of the Third Battle of Ypres. (details)
August 17	Asian and Pacific	China terminates the German and Austro-Hungarian concessions in Tianjin and occupies them.
August 18–28	Italian	Eleventh Battle of the Isonzo. (details)
August 20–26	Western	Second Offensive Battle of Verdun.
September – October	Eastern	Operation Albion. German capture of Oesel, Dago and Moon Islands.
September 1–3	Eastern	Battle of Jugla.
September 5	Asian and Pacific	The SMS Seeadler's crew sail to Fiji in a lifeboat and capture the French schooner Lutece, allowing their escape. They rename it Fortuna.
September 5–12	Politics	The Third Zimmerwald Conference of the anti-war socialist Zimmerwald Movement, is held in Stockholm. (details)
September 8–12	Politics	Russian General Lavr Kornilov's coup attempt fails. (details)
September 12	Politics	Alexandre Ribot resigns as Prime Minister of France; he is replaced by Paul Painlevé.
September 14	Politics	The Russian Republic is proclaimed.
September 20–26	Western	Battle of the Menin Road Ridge, second phase of the Third Battle of Ypres.
September 21	Politics	Costa Rica severs relations with Germany.
September 26–27	Western	Battle of Polygon Wood, second phase of the Third Battle of Ypres.
September 28–29	Middle Eastern	Battle of Ramadi.
October 4	Western	Battle of Broodseinde, second phase of the Third Battle of Ypres.
October 5	Asian and Pacific	The Fortuna wrecks at Easter Island and its crew is interned in Chile.
October 6	Politics	Peru severs relations with Germany.
October 7	Politics	Uruguay severs relations with Germany.
October 9	Western	Battle of Poelcappelle, last phase of the Third Battle of Ypres.
October 12	Western	First Battle of Passchendaele (Last phase of the Third Battle of Ypres).
October 15	Politics	After being tried and sentenced to death by the French, Mata Hari is executed by firing squad.
October 15–18	African	Battle of Mahiwa.
October 23	Middle Eastern	Battle of Wadi Musa.
October 23 – November 10	Western	Battle of La Malmaison, much-postponed French attack on the Chemin des Dames. (details)
October 24 – November 4	Italian	Battle of Caporetto. The Austro-Hungarians and Germans break through the Italian lines. The Italian army is defeated and falls back on the Piave. (details)
October 26	Politics	Brazil declares war on Germany.
October 26 – November 10	Western	Second Battle of Passchendaele, last phase of the Third Battle of Ypres.
October 27	Middle Eastern	Battle of Buqqar Ridge.
October 30	Politics	Vittorio Emanuele Orlando succeeds Paolo Boselli as Prime Minister of Italy.
October 31 – November 7	Middle Eastern	Third Battle of Gaza. The British break through the Ottoman lines. (details)
October 31	Middle Eastern	Battle of Beersheba, opening phase of the Third Battle of Gaza. (details)
November 1–6	Middle Eastern	Battle of Tel el Khuweilfe.
November 2	Politics	Balfour Declaration. The British government declares support and endorsement of political plans for a Jewish "national home" in Palestine.
November 5	Politics	The Allies agree to establish a Supreme War Council at Versailles.
November 7	Politics	October Revolution. Alexander Kerensky flees Petrograd just before the Bolsheviks of the Petrograd Soviet seize the Winter Palace. The provisional government is dissolved. The Russian Civil War begins.
November 7	Middle Eastern	Charge at Sheria.
November 8	Italian	Armando Diaz replaces Luigi Cadorna as Commander-in-Chief of the Italian Army. (details)
November 8	Middle Eastern	Charge at Huj.
November 9 – December 28	Italian	First Battle of the Piave. The Austro-Hungarians and Germans try unsuccessfully to cross the river. (details)
November 10	Western	The Third Battle of Ypres, also known as Battle of Passchendaele, ends. (details)
November 11 – December 23	Italian	First Battle of Monte Grappa, Austro-Hungarian offensive halted.
November 13	Politics	In France, Paul Painlevé is replaced by Georges Clemenceau as Prime Minister. (details)
November 13	Middle Eastern	Battle of Mughar Ridge.
November 14	Middle Eastern	Battle of Ayun Kara.
November 17	Naval	Second Battle of Heligoland Bight.
November 17 – December 30	Middle Eastern	Battle of Jerusalem. The British enter the city on December 11.
November 18–24	Middle Eastern	Battle of Nebi Samwil, a phase of the Battle of Jerusalem.
November 19	Italian	Battle of Caporetto ends. The Central Powers take a quarter of a million Italian prisoners.
November 20 – December 3	Western	First Battle of Cambrai. A British attack and the biggest German attack against the British since 1915 succeed. The battle ends in a stalemate. (details)
November 25	African	Battle of Ngomano, the Germans invade Portuguese East Africa to gain supplies.
December 1	Middle Eastern	Battle of El Burj, a phase of the Battle of Jerusalem.
December 6	Naval	Halifax Explosion. An accidental collision between the Norwegian supply ship SS Imo and the French cargo ship SS Mont-Blanc, laden with high explosives for the Western Front, leaves 2,000 dead and 9,000 injured in Richmond, Nova Scotia. It is the largest man-made explosion before the invention of atomic weapons.
December 6	Politics	Finland declares independence from Russia. (details).
December 7	Politics	The United States declares war on Austria-Hungary.
December 8	Politics	Ecuador severs relations with Germany.
December 9	Politics	Armistice between Romania and the Central Powers. (details).
December 10	Politics	Panama declares war on Austria-Hungary.
December 11	Middle Eastern	General Edmund Allenby leads British and Indian troops into Jerusalem, ending 400 years of Ottoman rule over the Holy Land.
December 15	Politics	Armistice between Russia and the Central Powers scheluded to take effect on December 17. (details).
December 16	Politics	Armistice between the Ottomans and the Russian Special Transcaucasian Committee. (details).
December 17	Politics	Canadian Prime Minister Robert Borden wins an enlarged majority in federal elections with the pro-conscription Unionist Party. (details)
December 20–21	Middle Eastern	Battle of Jaffa, a phase of the Battle of Jerusalem. (details)

== 1918 ==
Dates	Theater/Front/Campaign	Events
January 8	Politics	Woodrow Wilson outlines his Fourteen Points as a statement for peace to end the war.
January 25	Politics	The Russian Soviet Federative Socialist Republic is proclaimed, abolishing the Russian Republic.
February to September	Middle Eastern	Allied forces occupy the Jordan Rift Valley. (details)
February 9	Politics	The Central Powers sign an exclusive protectorate treaty with the Ukrainian People's Republic as part of the negotiations in Brest-Litovsk. (details)
February 15–16	Eastern	Battle of Rarancza.
February 18 – March 3	Eastern	Operation Faustschlag, last offensive on the Eastern Front.
February 19	Middle Eastern	British forces begin their assault on Jericho. (details)
February 21	Middle Eastern	The British capture Jericho.
February 21	Eastern	German forces capture Minsk. (details)
February 24	Eastern	German forces capture Zhytomyr. (details)
February 25	Eastern	German troops capture Tallinn. (details)
February 28	Eastern	German forces capture Pskov and Narva. (details)
March 2	Eastern	German forces capture Kiev. (details)
March 3	Politics	Treaty of Brest-Litovsk. Leon Trotsky, representing Russia, signs a separate peace treaty with Germany.
March 4		At Camp Funston, Fort Riley, Kansas, Private Albert Gitchell becomes the first known case of what will later be called Spanish flu.
March 7	Western	German artillery bombard the American troops at Rouge Bouquet.
March 8–12	Middle Eastern	Battle of Tell 'Asur.
March 8–13	Eastern	Battle of Bakhmach.
March 11		Over 100 sick from Spanish flu in Fort Riley; first known case outside in Queens, New York.
March 21 – April 5	Western	First phase of the German spring offensive Operation Michael, also known as Second Battle of the Somme. The Germans obtain a Pyrrhic victory. (details)
March 21–23	Western	The Battle of St. Quentin, first phase of Operation Michael and the Spring Offensive. (details)
March 21 – April 2	Middle Eastern	Transjordan Attack on Amman.
March 23 – August 7	Western	Artillery bombardment of Paris. (details)
March 24–25	Western	First Battle of Bapaume, a phase of Operation Michael. (details)
March 25	Western	First Battle of Noyon, a phase of Operation Michael. (details)
March 25	Politics	Penza Agreement. The Czechoslovak Legion is given free passage to Vladivostok to join the Allied forces in return for surrendering most weapons to the Bolsheviks.
March 26	Politics	French Marshal Ferdinand Foch is appointed Supreme Commander of all Allied forces. (details)
March 26–27	Western	Battle of Rosieres, a phase of Operation Michael. (details)
March 26–27	Middle Eastern	Action of Khan Baghdadi. British and Indian forces defeat Ottomans in Iraq.
March 27–31	Middle Eastern	First Battle of Amman, a phase of the First Transjordan Attack.
March 28	Western	Third Battle of Arras, a phase of Operation Michael. (details)
March 30 – April 5	Western	First Battle of Villers-Bretonneux, a phase of Operation Michael.
March 30	Western	Battle of Moreuil Wood.
April 1	Air	By proposal of General Jan Smuts and Lieutenant David Henderson, the Royal Air Force is founded by combining the Royal Flying Corps and the Royal Naval Air Service.
April 4–5	Western	Battle of the Avre, final phase of Operation Michael.
April 7–29	Western	Second phase of the Spring Offensive, Operation Georgette, also known as Battle of the Lys. The results are disappointing for the German military. (details)
April 7–9	Western	Battle of Estaires, first phase of Operation Georgette. (details)
April 10–11	Western	Third Battle of Messines, a phase of Operation Georgette. (details)
April 12–13	Western	Battle of Hazebrouck, a phase of Operation Georgette. (details)
April 13–15	Western	Battle of Bailleul, a phase of Operation Georgette. (details)
April 14	Politics	Ottokar Czernin resigns as Austria-Hungary's Foreign Minister over the Sixtus Affair. Stephan Burián von Rajecz replaces him.
April 17–19	Western	First Battle of Kemmelberg, a phase of Operation Georgette. (details)
April 18	Western	Battle of Bethune, a phase of Operation Georgette. (details)
April 21	Air	German flying ace Manfred von Richthofen, better known as The Red Baron, is shot down over Vaux-sur-Somme.
April 23	Politics	Guatemala declares war on Germany.
April 24–27	Western	Second Battle of Villers-Bretonneux, a phase of Operation Georgette.
April 25–26	Western	Second Battle of Kemmelberg, a phase of Operation Georgette. (details)
April 28	Politics	Gavrilo Princip dies in Terezín prison, from tuberculosis.
April 29	Western	Battle of Scherpenberg, final phase of Operation Georgette. (details)
April 30 – May 4	Middle Eastern	Second Transjordan Attack on Shunet Nimrin and Es Salt.
May 7	Politics	Treaty of Bucharest between Romania and the Central Powers. It will never be ratified.
May 8	Politics	Nicaragua declares war on Germany and Austria-Hungary.
May 10–11	Eastern	Battle of Kaniow.
May 14	Politics	Clash at Chelyabinsk station between Hungarian prisoners of war heading west to be repatriated and Czechoslovaks going east. Leon Trotsky orders the detention of the Czechoslovak Legion, but they revolt and seize several towns along the Trans-Siberian Railway. (details)
May 21	Caucasian	The Ottomans invade Armenia. (details)
May 21–29	Caucasian	Battle of Sardarabad, a phase of the invasion of Armenia.
May 21–29	Caucasian	Battle of Abaran, a phase of the invasion of Armenia.
May 23	Politics	Costa Rica declares war on Germany.
May 24–28	Caucasian	Battle of Karakilisa, a phase of the invasion of Armenia.
May 27 – June 6	Western	Third Battle of the Aisne, also known as Operation Blücher-Yorck, third phase of the Spring Offensive. After initial gains, the German advance is halted. (details)
May 28	Western	Battle of Cantigny.
May 29–31	Balkan	Battle of Skra-di-Legen
June 1–26	Western	Battle of Belleau Wood, part of the German spring offensive.
June 8	Middle Eastern	Action of Arsuf.
June 8	Caucasian	Ottoman troops re-enter Tabriz. (details)
June 8	Politics	The Czechoslovak Legion forms the Committee of Members of the Constituent Assembly in Samara. Stanislav Čeček calls to join forces with anti-Bolshevik Russians to overthrow the Bolshevik government and reignite the Eastern Front. (details)
June 8 – October	Caucasian	Germany intervenes in the Caucasus, clashing with Ottoman forces over Georgia. (details)
June 9–12	Western	Fourth phase of the Spring Offensive, Operation Gneisenau, also known as Battle of Matz. Despite substantial territorial gains, the Germans do not achieve their strategic goals (details)
June 13	Politics	A Provisional Siberian Government is formed in Omsk.
June 15–23	Italian	Second Battle of the Piave. The Austro-Hungarian offensive is repelled. (details)
June 15–31	Caucasian	The Ottomans occupy Dilman, Khoy and Urmia. (Details.)
June 23	Eastern	British and French troops land at Murmansk in Northern Russia. It's the beginning of Allied Intervention in the Russian Civil War on the White Army's side. (Details.)
July 3	Politics	Mehmed V, Sultan of the Ottoman Empire, dies. His half-brother, Mehmed VI, succeeds him.
July 4	Western	Battle of Hamel.
July 12	Politics	Haiti declares war on Germany.
July 14	Middle Eastern	Battle of Abu Tellul.
July 15 – August 6	Western	Second Battle of the Marne and last German offensive on the Western Front, which fails when the Germans are counterattacked by the French. (details)
July 15–17	Western	Champagne-Marne Offensive, consisting of the Fourth Battle of Champagne and the Battle of the Mountain of Reims, a phase of the Second Battle of the Marne. Last phase of the Spring Offensive and last German offensive of the war. (details)
July 17	Politics	In Yekaterinburg, former Tsar Nicholas II and his family are executed by the Bolsheviks, out of fear that they might be released by Czechoslovak and White Army troops. (details)
July 18	Western	Battle of Chateau-Thierry, a phase of the Second Battle of the Marne. (details)
July 18	Western	End of the Second Battle of Artois.
July 18–22	Western	Battle of Soissons, a phase of the Second Battle of the Marne. (details)
July 19	Western	Battle of Tardenois, a phase of the Second Battle of the Marne.
July 19	Politics	Honduras declares war on Germany.
August		Spanish flu virus mutates. Simultaneous deadlier outbreaks in Brest, Freetown and Boston.
August 5	Eastern	The Czechoslovak People's Army of Komuch takes Kazan from the Bolsheviks and seizes the Russian gold reserve. (details)
August 8 – November 11	Western	Hundred Days Offensive, last offensive on the Western Front.
August 8–12	Western	Battle of Amiens, first phase of the Hundred Days Offensive. (details)
August 9–12	Western	Battle of Montdidier.
August 13 – September 3	Italian	Battle of San Matteo.
August 17–29	Western	Second Battle of Noyon, a phase of the Hundred Days Offensive. (details)
August 18 — September 16	Western	Oise-Aisne Offensive, a phase of the Hundred Days Offensive. (details)
August 21–22	Western	Third Battle of Albert, opening phase of the Second Battle of the Somme. (details)
August 21 – September 3	Western	Second Battle of the Somme, also known as Third Battle of the Somme, a phase of the Hundred Days Offensive. (details)
August 21 – September 3	Western	Second Battle of Bapaume, a phase of the Second Battle of the Somme.
August 26 – September 3	Western	Fourth Battle of Arras, also known as Second Battle of Arras, a phase of the Second Battle of the Somme (details)
August 26–30	Western	Fourth Battle of the Scarpe, a phase of the Fourth Battle of Arras. (details)
August 26 – September 14	Caucasian	Battle of Baku, last Ottoman offensive of the war.
August 30–31	African	Battle of Lioma.
August 31 – September 3	Western	Battle of Mont Saint-Quentin, a phase of the Second Battle of the Somme.
September 1–2	Western	Battle of Peronne, a phase of the Battle of Mont Saint-Quentin. (details)
September 2–3	Western	Battle of Drocourt-Queant Line, final phase of the Second Battle of the Somme. (details)
September 8–23	Politics	Ufa Conference. Formation of the Provisional All-Russian Government with the support of the Czechoslovak Legion. The Russian State is proclaimed under the leadership of Nikolai Avksentiev.
September 10	Western	Battle of Savy-Dallon, a phase of the Hundred Days Offensive. (details)
September 12	Western	Battle of Havrincourt, a phase of the Hundred Days Offensive. (details)
September 12–15	Western	Battle of Saint-Mihiel, a phase of the Hundred Days Offensive.
September 14	Western	Battle of Vauxaillon, a phase of the Hundred Days Offensive. (details)
September 14–29	Balkan	Vardar Offensive, final offensive on the Balkan Front.
September 15	Balkan	French and Serb forces break through the Bulgarian lines at Dobro Polje, a phase of the Vardar Offensive. (details)
September 18	Western	Battle of Epehy, a phase of the Hundred Days Offensive.
September 18–19	Balkan	Third Battle of Doiran, a phase of the Vardar Offensive. The Bulgarians halt the British and Greek advance. (details)
September 18 – October 17	Western	Battle of the Hindenburg Line, a phase of the Hundred Days Offensive. The Allies break through the German lines. (details)
September 19–25	Middle Eastern	Battle of Megiddo. The Ottoman army is routed and the British conquer Palestine. (details)
September 19–25	Middle Eastern	Battle of Nablus, a phase of the Battle of Meggido. (details)
September 19–25	Middle Eastern	Third Transjordan Attack, a phase of the Battle of Nablus.
September 19–25	Middle Eastern	Battle of Sharon, a phase of the Battle of Megiddo.
September 19	Middle Eastern	Battle of Tulkarm, a phase of the Battle of Sharon.
September 19	Middle Eastern	Battle of Arara, a phase of the Battle of Sharon.
September 19–20	Middle Eastern	Battle of Tabsor, a phase of the Battle of Sharon.
September 20	Middle Eastern	Capture of Jenin, a phase of the Battle of Sharon.
September 20	Middle Eastern	The British capture both Afulah and Beisan during the Battle of Sharon. (details)
September 20–21	Middle Eastern	Battle of Nazareth, a phase of the Battle of Sharon.
September 22	Middle Eastern	The British capture Jisr ed Damieh in the Battle of Sharon. (details)
September 23	Middle Eastern	Battle of Haifa, a phase of the Battle of Sharon. (details)
September 25	Middle Eastern	Battle of Samakh, a phase of the Battle of Sharon.
September 25	Middle Eastern	The British capture Tiberias during the Battle of Sharon. (details)
September 25	Middle Eastern	Second Battle of Amman, a phase of the Third Transjordan Attack.
September 26 – November 11	Western	Meuse-Argonne Offensive, the final phase of the Hundred Days Offensive and of the war. (details)
September 26 – October 1	Middle Eastern	The British enter Damascus. (details)
September 26	Western	Battle of Somme-Py, initial phase of the Meuse-Argonne Offensive. (details)
September 26	Middle Eastern	Charge at Irbid, a phase of the Capture of Damascus.
September 26–27	Middle Eastern	The British take Deraa during the Capture of Damascus. (details)
September 27	Middle Eastern	Battle of Jisr Benat Yakub, a phase of the Capture of Damascus.
September 27 – October 1	Western	Battle of the Canal du Nord, a phase of the Battle of the Hindenburg Line.
September 28 – October 2	Western	Fifth Battle of Ypres, also known as the Advance on Flanders, a phase of the Battle of the Hindenburg Line.
September 29 – October 10	Western	Battle of St. Quentin Canal, a phase of the Hundred Days Offensive.
September 30	Politics	Armistice between Bulgaria and the Allies. (details).
September 30	Western	Battle of Saint-Thierry, initial phase of the Meuse-Argonne Offensive. (details)
September 30	Middle Eastern	Charge at Kaukab, a phase of the Capture of Damascus.
September 30	Middle Eastern	Charge at Kiswe, a phase of the Capture of Damascus.
October 3	Politics	Tsar Ferdinand I of Bulgaria abdicates, his son Boris III succeeds him.
October 3–27	Middle Eastern	Pursuit to Haritan. Allied troops, advancing from Haifa and Acre, capture Beirut and Tripoli.
October 3–27	Western	Battle of Blanc Mont Ridge.
October 4	Politics	Germany requests an armistice to U.S. President Woodrow Wilson. He demands German withdrawal from all occupied territory, and Kaiser Wilhelm II's abdication.
October 8	Politics	Talaat Pasha announces his intention to resign as Grand Vizier. War Minister and Chief of the General Staff Enver Pasha resigns too.
October 8–10	Western	Second Battle of Cambrai, a phase of the Battle of the Hindenburg Line. (details)
October 14	Politics	General strike in Bohemia. The same day the Czechoslovak declaration of independence from Austria-Hungary is made in Washington, D.C., proclaiming the First Czechoslovak Republic. (details).
October 14	Politics	Ahmed Izzet Pasha is appointed Ottoman Grand Vizier.
October 14–17	Western	Battle of Montfaucon, intermediate phase of the Meuse-Argonne Offensive). (details)
October 14–19	Western	Battle of Courtrai, closing phase of the Hundred Days offensive. (details)
October 15	Western	Battle of Mont-D'Origny, a phase of the Hundred Days Offensive. (details)
October 17–26	Western	Battle of the Selle, closing phase of the Hundred Days Offensive.
October 20	Naval	Germany suspends submarine warfare. (details)
October 20	Western	Battle of Lys and Escaut, wich included the Second Battle of Lys and the Battle of the Escaut, a phase of the Hundred Days Offensive. (details)
October 20	Western	Battle of Serre, a phase of the Hundred Days Offensive. (details)
October 23–30	Middle Eastern	Battle of Sharqat.
October 24 – November 4	Italian	Battle of Vittorio Veneto. The Austro-Hungarian army is routed out by the Italians, who enter Trento and land at Triest. (details)
October 24–28	Italian	Second Battle of Monte Grappa, beginning phase of Vittorio Veneto.
October 25	Middle Eastern	Battle of Aleppo. (details)
October 29	Politics	Wilhelm Groener replaces Erich Ludendorff as Hindenburg's deputy. (details)
October 29	Naval	German sailors mutiny at Wilhelmshaven and Kiel. The German Revolution begins. (details)
October 29	Politics	In Slavonia, Austria-Hungary, the State of Slovenes, Croats and Serbs is proclaimed.
October 30	Politics	Armistice between the Ottoman Empire and the United Kingdom. (details).
October 31	Politics	Aster Revolution. Hungarian nationalists proclaim the First Hungarian Republic.
November		First Spanish flu cases in Spain, where reports on the disease are published freely due to the lack of wartime censorship.
November 1	Western	Battle of Chesne, closing phase of the Meuse-Argonne Offensive. (details)
November 1–2	Western	Battle of Valenciennes, closing phase of the Hundred Days Offensive. (details)
November 3	Politics	Armistice between the Austro-Hungarian Empire and Italy, effective November 4. (details).
November 4	Western	Battle of the Sambre, closing phase of the Hundred Days Offensive. (details)
November 4	Western	Second Battle of Guise, a phase of the Battle of Sambre. (details)
November 4	Western	Battle of Thierache, a phase of the Battle of Sambre. (details)
November 5	Politics	The Committee of Union and Progress, the "Young Turks", dissolves itself in its last party congress. Its leaders, the Three Pashas, escape Constantinople in a German torpedo boat.
November 6–11	Western	Advance to the Meuse.
November 9	Politics	Kaiser Wilhelm II of Germany abdicates. The German monarchy is abolished and a republic is proclaimed, later known as the Weimar Republic. (details)
November 10	Politics	Emperor Karl I of Austria abdicates. The Habsburg monarchy is dissolved. (details)
November 10	Balkan	Romania rejoins the war against the defeated Central Powers, hoping to claim Transylvania from the collapsing Austria-Hungary.
November 11	Politics	At 5 a.m., Germany signs the Armistice of Compiègne with France. End of fighting effective at 11 a.m.. World War I is over. (details)
November 11	Politics	The Second Polish Republic is proclaimed.
November 12	Politics	The Republic of German-Austria is proclaimed.
November 12	Balkan	Occupation of Constantinople.
November 14	Politics	Tomáš Masaryk becomes first president of Czechoslovakia.
November 14	Naval	German U-boats interned.
November 14	African	Three days after the armistice, fighting ends in German East Africa when General Paul von Lettow-Vorbeck agrees a cease-fire after hearing of Germany's surrender.
November 18	Politics	Admiral Alexander Kolchak seizes control of the Provisional All-Russian Government in a coup, peoclaiming himself Supreme Ruler of Russia. (details).
November 21	Naval	Germany's Hochseeflotte surrenders to the United Kingdom. (details)
November 22	Western	German troops evacuate Luxembourg.
November 25	African	11 days after agreeing a cease-fire, General von Lettow-Vorbeck formally surrenders his undefeated Askari Schutztruppe at Northern Rhodesia.
November 27	Western	German troops evacuate Belgium.
December 1	Politics	The Kingdom of Serbs, Croats and Slovenes, later known as Yugoslavia, is proclaimed.
December 21	Politics	The Ottoman Chamber of Deputies is dissolved by Sultan Mehmed VI, hoping to directly negotiate with the Allies.

== 1919 ==
Dates	Theater/Front/Campaign	Events
January 5	Asian and Pacific	Hermann Detzner surrenders at the Finschhafen District of New Guinea.
January 10	Middle Eastern	Fakhri Pasha surrenders at Medina. (details)
January 18	Politics	Treaty of Versailles between the Allies and Germany: the Peace Conference opens in Paris. (details)
January 25	Politics	Proposal to create the League of Nations accepted. (details)
January 27	Politics	The Czechoslovak Legion assumes complete control of the Trans-Siberian Railway.
March 31	Middle Eastern	By this time, all Ottoman troops in Yemen have surrendered. (detaills)
May 15	Middle Eastern	Greek occupation of Smyrna, beginning of the Greco–Turkish War.
May 16	Middle Eastern	Mustafa Kemal Pasha is dispatched to the Ninth Army Troops Inspectorate in Samsun
June 21	Naval	German High Seas Fleet (53 ships) scuttled in Scapa Flow with nine deaths, the last casualties of the war. (details)
June 28	Politics	Treaty of Versailles signed. (details)
July 8	Politics	Germany ratifies the Treaty of Versailles. (details)
July 21	Politics	The United Kingdom ratifies the Treaty of Versailles. (details)
November 10–11	Politics	A Banquet in Honour of The President of the French Republic is hosted by King George V and held at Buckingham Palace during the evening hours of November 10. The very first Armistice Day is held on the Grounds of Buckingham Palace on the Morning of November 11. This will set the trend for the later Remembrance Day. (details)
November 14	Politics	The Bolsheviks take Omsk. Kolchak's retreat east is impeded by the Czechoslovaks denying him use of the Trans-Siberian.

== 1920 ==
Dates	Theater/Campaign/Front	Events
January 4	Politics	A coup in Irkutsk deposes Kolchak. (details)
January 10	Politics	First meeting of the League of Nations held in London. (details)
January 10	Politics	Free City of Danzig established. (details)
January 20	Politics	Irkutsk surrenders to the Bolsheviks.
January 21	Politics	The Paris Peace Conference ends. (details)
February 7	Politics	Armistice between the Bolsheviks and the Czechoslovak Legion. The Czechoslovaks surrender the Russian gold reserves and Kolchak in return for free passage to Vladivostok. Kolchak and his Prime Minister, Viktor Pepelyayev are executed.
February 10	Politics	A plebiscite returns Northern Schleswig to Denmark. (details)
March 16	Middle Eastern	Formal occupation of Constantinople
April 19–26	Politics	Conference of Sanremo, Italy, about League of Nations mandates in former Ottoman territories of the Middle East. (details)
April 23	Politics	Opening of the Grand National Assembly, establishment of the Ankara government.
June 4	Politics	Treaty of Trianon between the Allies and Hungary. (details)
August 10	Politics	Treaty of Sèvres between the Allies and the Istanbul Government of Ottoman Empire against objections of Turkish National Assembly. (details)
September 8	Politics	Gabriele D'Annunzio proclaims in Fiume the Italian Regency of Carnaro. (details)
November 1	Politics	League of Nations headquarters moved to Geneva, Switzerland. (details)
November 12	Politics	Treaty of Rapallo between Italy and Yugoslavia. Zadar is annexed by Italy and the Free State of Fiume is established. (details)
November 15	Politics	The League of Nations holds its first general assembly. (details)

== Post-1920 ==
Dates	Campaign/Front/Theater	Events
1921
October 13	Politics	Treaty of Kars between Bolshevik Russia and Turkey. (details)
1922
February 6	Politics	Washington Naval Treaty, limiting naval tonnage, signed by France, Italy, Japan, the United Kingdom and the United States. (details)
April 10 – May 19	Politics	Genoa Conference. Representatives of 34 countries discuss economics in the wake of the Great War. (details)
April 16	Politics	Treaty of Rapallo between Germany and Bolshevik Russia to normalize diplomatic relations. (details)
September 11	Politics	Treaty of Kars ratified in Yerevan, Armenia. (details)
November 1	Politics	Abolition of the Ottoman Sultanate
November 17	Politics	Mehmed VI flees Turkey
1923
June 16	Politics	The Russian Civil War ends.
July 24	Politics	Treaty of Lausanne between the Allies and Turkey's Ankara government. It supersedes the Treaty of Sèvres. (details)
October 4	Middle Eastern	Allied evacuation of Constantinople
October 29	Politics	Proclamation of the Republic of Turkey
1924
January 27	Politics	Treaty of Rome between Italy and Yugoslavia. Fiume is annexed by Italy and the neighbouring town of Sušak is assigned to Yugoslavia. (details)
March 3	Politics	The Ottoman caliphate is dissolved.
2010
October 3	Politics	Germany makes final reparations payments. (details)

== See also ==
- Timeline of World War I (1917–1918)
- Diplomatic history of World War I

== Sources ==
- Albertini, Luigi (1953). Origins of the War of 1914. Oxford: Oxford University Press. OCLC 168712.
- Boemeke, Manfred Franz (1998). The Treaty of Versailles: A Reassessment After 75 years. Cambridge University Press. ISBN 0-521-62132-1.
- Creveld, Martin van (1977). Supplying War: Logistics from Wallenstein to Patton. Cambridge University Press. ISBN 0-521-29793-1.
- Evans, David (2004). The First World War. Teach yourself. London: Hodder Arnold. ISBN 0-340-88489-4. OCLC 224332259.
- Farwell, Byron (1989). The Great War in Africa, 1914–1918. W.W. Norton. ISBN 978-0-393-30564-7.
- Gottschall, Terrell D. (2003). By order of the Kaiser: Otto von Diederichs and the rise of the Imperial German Navy, 1865–1902. Naval Institute Press. ISBN 1-55750-309-5.
- Halpern, Paul G. (1995). A Naval History of World War I. Routledge. ISBN 1-85728-498-4.
- Keegan, John (1998). The First World War. London: Hutchinson. ISBN 9780091801786.
- Lowe, John (1994). The Great Powers, Imperialism, and the German Problem, 1865–1925. Routledge. ISBN 0-415-10444-0.
- Neiberg, Michael S. (2005). Fighting the Great War: A Global History. Cambridge, Mass: Harvard University Press. ISBN 0-674-01696-3. OCLC 56592292.
- Odgers, George (1994). 100 Years of Australians at War. Lansdowne. ISBN 1-86302-669-X.
- Willmott, H.P. (2003). World War I. New York: Dorling Kindersley. ISBN 0-7894-9627-5. OCLC 52541937.
- Tucker, Spencer (2005). World War I: encyclopedia. ABC-CLIO. ISBN 1-85109-420-2.
