= Timeline of World War I (1917–1918) =

World War I (1917–1918)
- Italian machine-gun crew in position on Monte Grappa during the Battle of Vittorio Veneto, 1918
| Location | Global |

Belligerents
| Allies: France; British Empire; United Kingdom; India; Australia; New Zealand; South Africa; Newfoundland; Russia (surrendered); Russian SFSR (surrendered); United States; Japan; Italy; Belgium; Serbia; Romania (surrendered); Greece | Central Powers: Germany; Austria-Hungary; Ottoman Empire; Bulgaria |

The following is a timeline of the events of World War I from 1917 to 1918.

== Withdrawal and the Russian Revolution begins (March–November 1917) ==
By the end of 1916, Russian casualties totalled nearly five million killed, wounded or captured, with major urban areas affected by food shortages and high prices. In March 1917, Tsar Nicholas ordered the military to forcibly suppress a wave of strikes in Petrograd but the troops refused to fire on the crowds. Revolutionaries set up the Petrograd Soviet and fearing a left-wing takeover, the State Duma forced Nicholas to abdicate and established the Russian Provisional Government, which confirmed Russia's willingness to continue the war. However, the Petrograd Soviet refused to disband, creating competing power centres and caused confusion and chaos, with frontline soldiers becoming increasingly demoralised and unwilling to fight on.

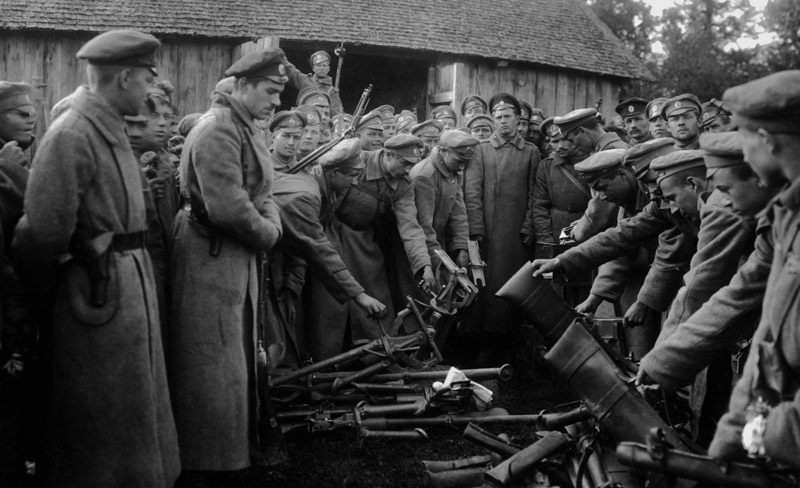
Troops led by General Lavr Kornilov lay down their arms, August 1917

In the summer of 1917, a Central Powers offensive began in Romania under the command of August von Mackensen to knock Romania out of the war, resulting in the battles of Oituz, Mărăști and Mărășești where up to 1,000,000 Central Powers troops were present. The battles lasted from 22 July to 3 September and eventually the Romanian army was victorious. August von Mackensen could not plan for another offensive as he had to transfer troops to the Italian Front.

Following the Tsar's abdication, Vladimir Lenin—with the help of the German government—was ushered by train from Switzerland into Russia on 16 April 1917. Discontent and the weaknesses of the Provisional Government led to a rise in the popularity of the Bolshevik Party, led by Lenin, which demanded an immediate end to the war. The Revolution of November was followed in December by an armistice and negotiations with Germany. At first, the Bolsheviks refused the German terms, but when German troops began marching across Ukraine unopposed, the new government acceded to the Treaty of Brest-Litovsk on 3 March 1918. The treaty ceded vast territories, including Finland, Estonia, Latvia, Lithuania, parts of Poland and Ukraine to the Central Powers. Despite this enormous German success, the manpower required by the Germans to occupy the captured territory may have contributed to the failure of their Spring Offensive, and secured relatively little food or other materiel for the Central Powers war effort.

With the Russian Empire out of the war, Romania found itself alone on the Eastern Front and signed the Treaty of Bucharest with the Central Powers in May 1918, ending the state of war between Romania and the Central Powers. Under the terms of the treaty, Romania had to give territory to Austria-Hungary and Bulgaria, and lease its oil reserves to Germany. However, the terms also included the Central Powers recognition of the union of Bessarabia with Romania.

== United States enters the war (April 1917) ==
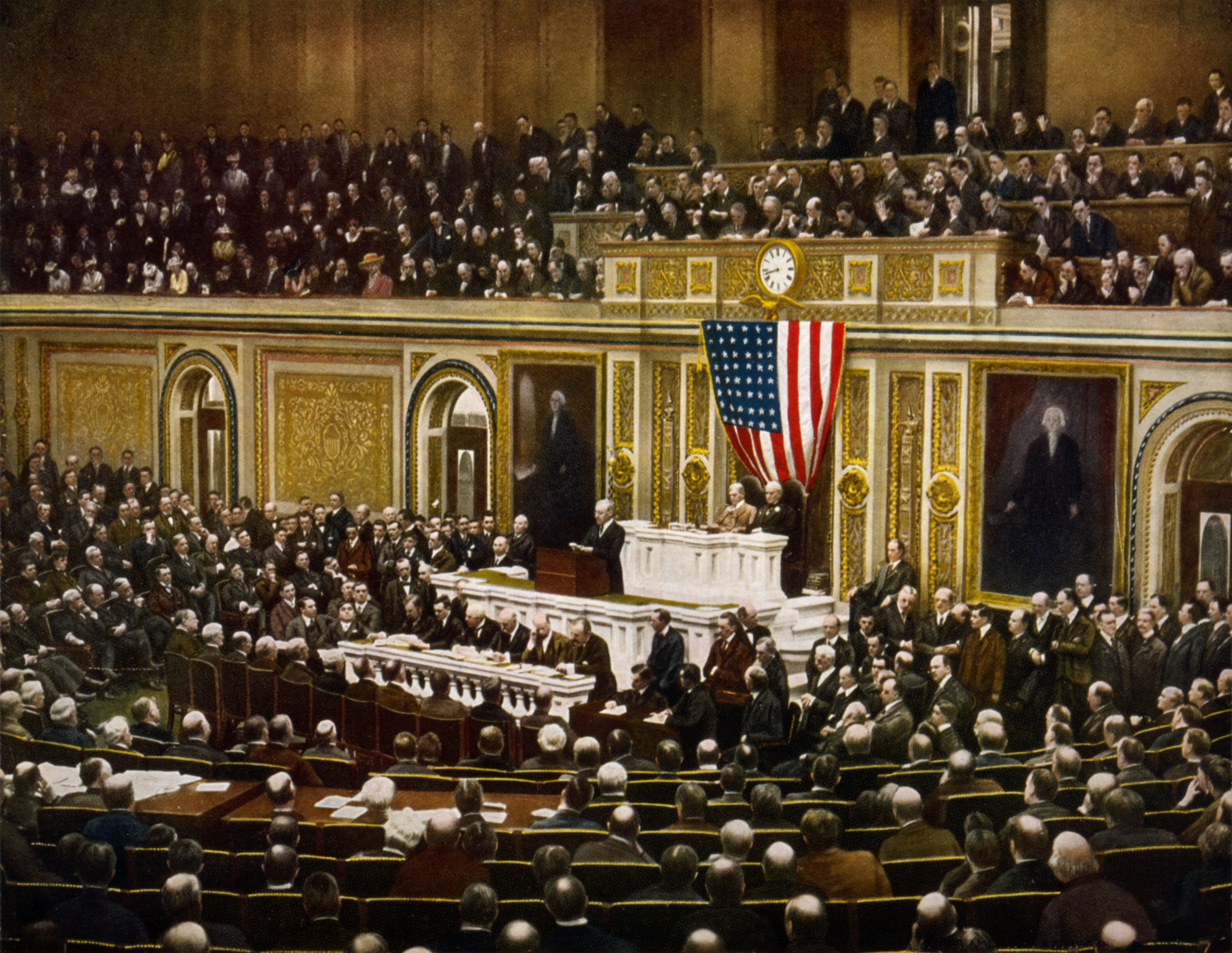
President Wilson asking Congress to declare war on Germany, 2 April 1917

The United States was a major supplier of war materials to the Allies but remained neutral in 1914, in large part due to domestic opposition. The most significant factor in creating the support Wilson needed was the German submarine offensive, which not only cost American lives, but paralysed trade as ships were reluctant to put to sea. On 7 May 1915, 128 Americans died when the British Passenger ship Lusitania was sunk by a German submarine. President Woodrow Wilson demanded an apology and warned the United States would not tolerate unrestricted submarine warfare, but refused to be drawn into the war. When more Americans died after the sinking of SS Arabic in August, Bethman-Hollweg ordered an end to such attacks. However, in response to British blockades, Germany resumed the use of unrestricted submarine warfare (Note: This gave German submarines permission to attack any merchant ships entering the war zone, regardless of their cargo or nationality; the zone included all British and French coastal waters) on 1 February 1917. On 24 February 1917, Wilson was presented with the Zimmermann Telegram; drafted in January by German Foreign Secretary Arthur Zimmermann, it was intercepted and decoded by British intelligence, who shared it with their American counterparts. Zimmermann hoped to exploit nationalist feelings in Mexico caused by American incursions during the Pancho Villa Expedition, promising support for a war against the US and help them recover territory lost from the Mexican–American War, although this offer was promptly rejected.

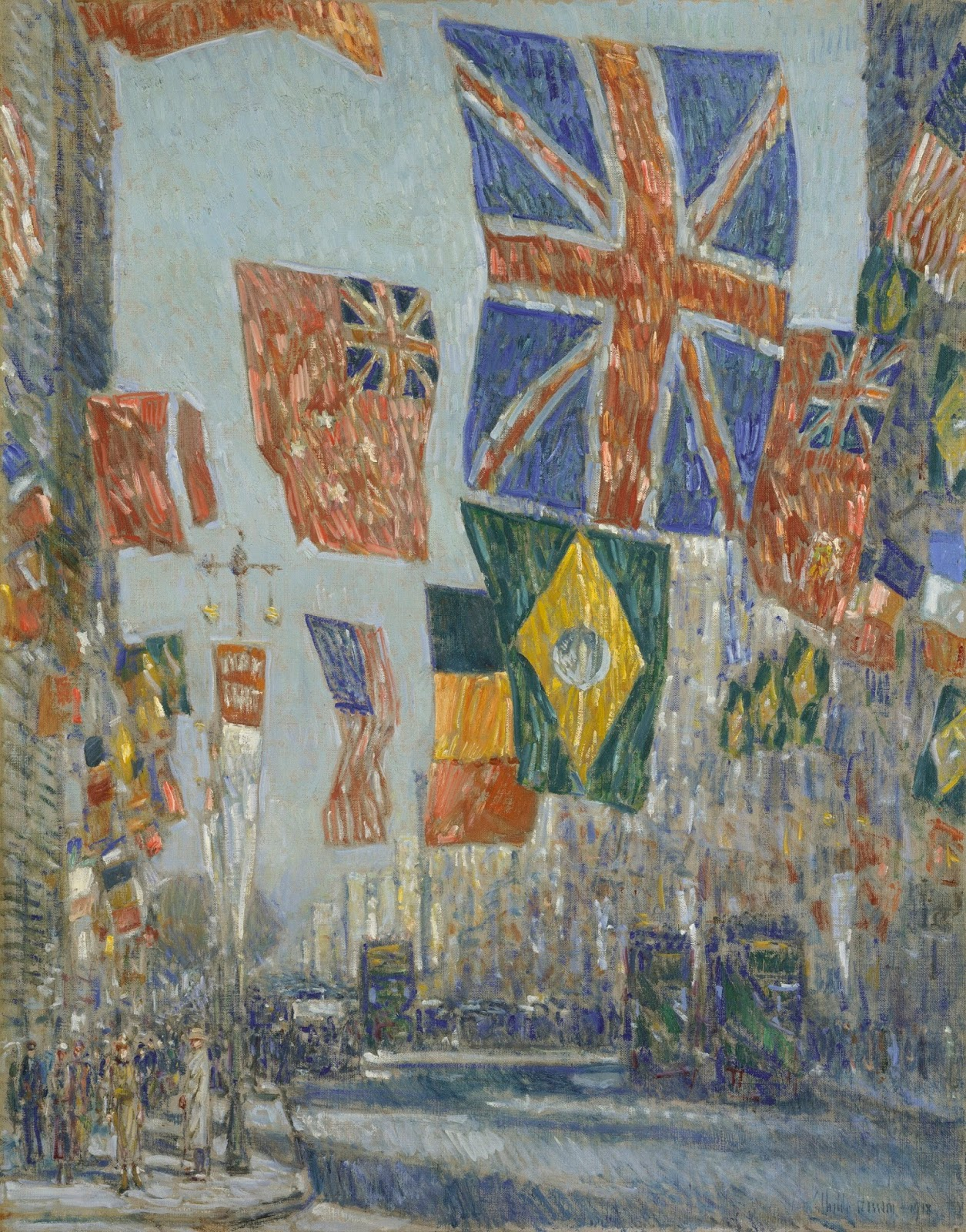
The Allied Avenue, 1917 painting by Childe Hassam, that depicts Manhattan's Fifth Avenue decorated with flags from Allied nations

On 6 April 1917, Congress declared war on Germany as an "Associated Power" of the Allies. The United States Navy sent a battleship group to Scapa Flow to join the Grand Fleet and provided convoy escorts. In April 1917, the United States Army had fewer than 300,000 men, including National Guard units, compared to British and French armies of 4.1 and 8.3 million respectively. The Selective Service Act of 1917 drafted 2.8 million men, although training and equipping such numbers was a huge logistical challenge. By June 1918, over 667,000 members of the American Expeditionary Forces (AEF), had been transported to France, a figure which reached 2 million by the end of November. However, American tactical doctrine was still based on pre-1914 principles, a world away from the combined arms approach used by the French and British by 1918. US commanders were initially slow to accept such ideas, leading to heavy casualties and it was not until the last month of the war that these failings were rectified.

Despite his conviction Germany must be defeated, Wilson went to war to ensure the US played a leading role in shaping the peace, which meant preserving the AEF as a separate military force, rather than being absorbed into British or French units as his Allies wanted. He was strongly supported by AEF commander General John J. Pershing, a proponent of pre-1914 "open warfare" who considered the French and British emphasis on artillery as misguided and incompatible with American "offensive spirit". Much to the frustration of his Allies, who had suffered heavy losses in 1917, he insisted on retaining control of American troops and refused to commit them to the front line until able to operate as independent units. As a result, the first significant US involvement was the Meuse–Argonne offensive in late September 1918.

== Nivelle Offensive and French Army mutinies (April–June 1917) ==
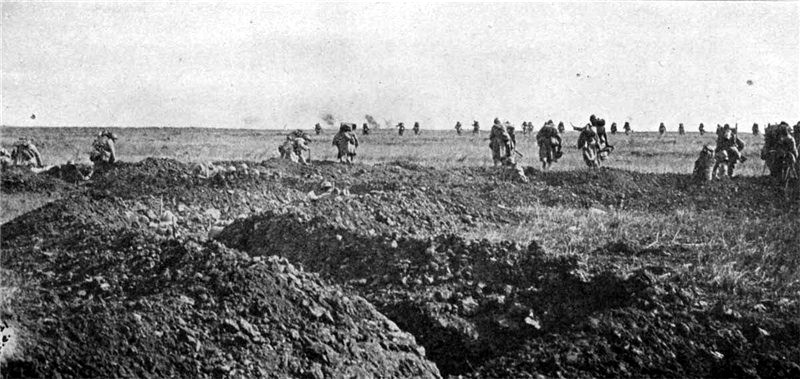
French infantry advance on the Chemin des Dames, April 1917

Verdun cost the French nearly 400,000 casualties, and the horrific conditions severely impacted morale, leading to a number of incidents of indiscipline. Although relatively minor, they reflected a belief among the rank and file that their sacrifices were not appreciated by their government or senior officers. Combatants on both sides claimed the battle was the most psychologically exhausting of the entire war; recognising this, Philippe Pétain frequently rotated divisions, a process known as the noria system. While this ensured units were withdrawn before their ability to fight was significantly eroded, it meant a high proportion of the French army was affected by the battle. By the beginning of 1917, morale was brittle, even in divisions with good combat records.

In December 1916, Robert Nivelle replaced Pétain as commander of French armies on the Western Front and began planning a spring attack in Champagne, part of a joint Franco-British operation. Nivelle claimed the capture of his main objective, the Chemin des Dames, would achieve a massive breakthrough and cost no more than 15,000 casualties. Poor security meant German intelligence was well informed on tactics and timetables, but despite this, when the attack began on 16 April the French made substantial gains, before being brought to a halt by the newly built and extremely strong defences of the Hindenburg Line. Nivelle persisted with frontal assaults and by 25 April the French had suffered nearly 135,000 casualties, including 30,000 dead, most incurred in the first two days.

Concurrent British attacks at Arras were more successful, although ultimately of little strategic value. Operating as a separate unit for the first time, the Canadian Corps capture of Vimy Ridge during the battle is viewed by many Canadians as a defining moment in creating a sense of national identity. Although Nivelle continued the offensive, on 3 May the 21st Division, which had been involved in some of the heaviest fighting at Verdun, refused orders to go into battle, initiating the French Army mutinies; within days, acts of "collective indiscipline" had spread to 54 divisions, while over 20,000 deserted. Unrest was almost entirely confined to the infantry, whose demands were largely non-political, including better economic support for families at home, and regular periods of leave, which Nivelle had ended.

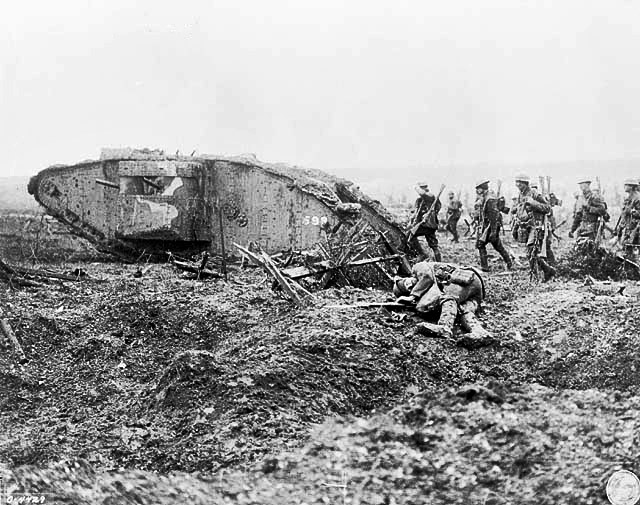
Canadian Corps troops at the Battle of Vimy Ridge, 1917

Although the vast majority remained willing to defend their own lines, they refused to participate in offensive action, reflecting a complete breakdown of trust in the army leadership. Nivelle was removed from command on 15 May and replaced by Pétain, who resisted demands for drastic punishment and set about restoring morale by improving conditions. While exact figures are still debated, only 27 men were actually executed, with another 3,000 sentenced to periods of imprisonment; however, the psychological effects were long-lasting, one veteran commenting "Pétain has purified the unhealthy atmosphere...but they have ruined the heart of the French soldier".

In 1917, Emperor Charles I of Austria secretly attempted separate peace negotiations with Clemenceau, through his wife's brother Sixtus in Belgium as an intermediary, without the knowledge of Germany. Italy opposed the proposals. When the negotiations failed, his attempt was revealed to Germany, resulting in a diplomatic catastrophe.

== Sinai and Palestine campaign (1917–1918) ==
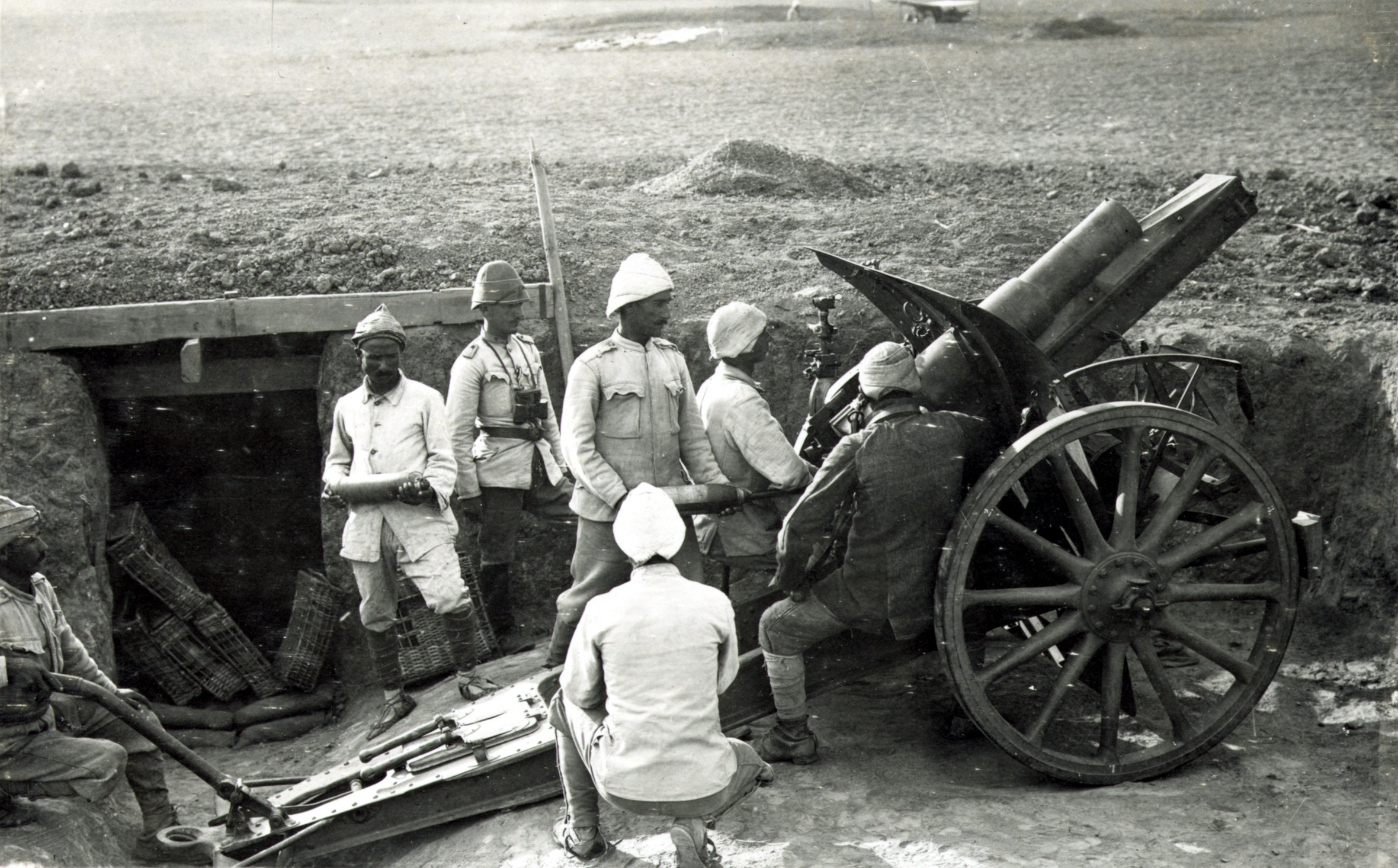
10.5 cm Feldhaubitze 98/09 and Ottoman artillerymen at Hareira in 1917 before the Southern Palestine offensive

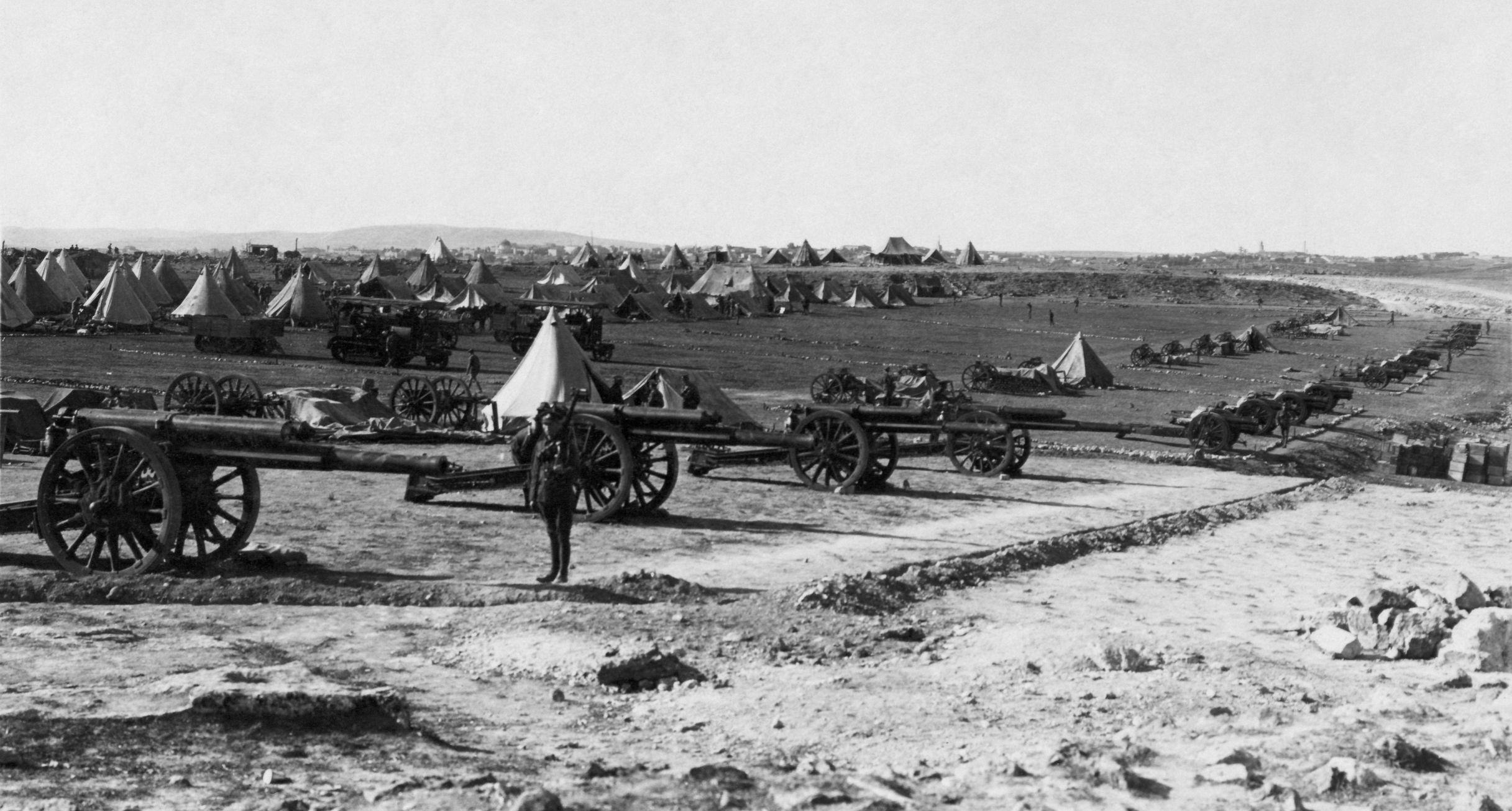
British artillery battery on Mount Scopus in the Battle of Jerusalem, 1917. Foreground, a battery of 16 heavy guns. Background, conical tents and support vehicles.

In March and April 1917, at the First and Second Battles of Gaza, German and Ottoman forces stopped the advance of the Egyptian Expeditionary Force, which had begun in August 1916 at the Battle of Romani. At the end of October, the Sinai and Palestine campaign resumed, when General Edmund Allenby's XXth Corps, XXI Corps and Desert Mounted Corps won the Battle of Beersheba. Two Ottoman armies were defeated a few weeks later at the Battle of Mughar Ridge and, early in December, Jerusalem was captured following another Ottoman defeat at the Battle of Jerusalem. About this time, Friedrich Freiherr Kress von Kressenstein was relieved of his duties as the Eighth Army's commander, replaced by Djevad Pasha, and a few months later the commander of the Ottoman Army in Palestine, Erich von Falkenhayn, was replaced by Otto Liman von Sanders.

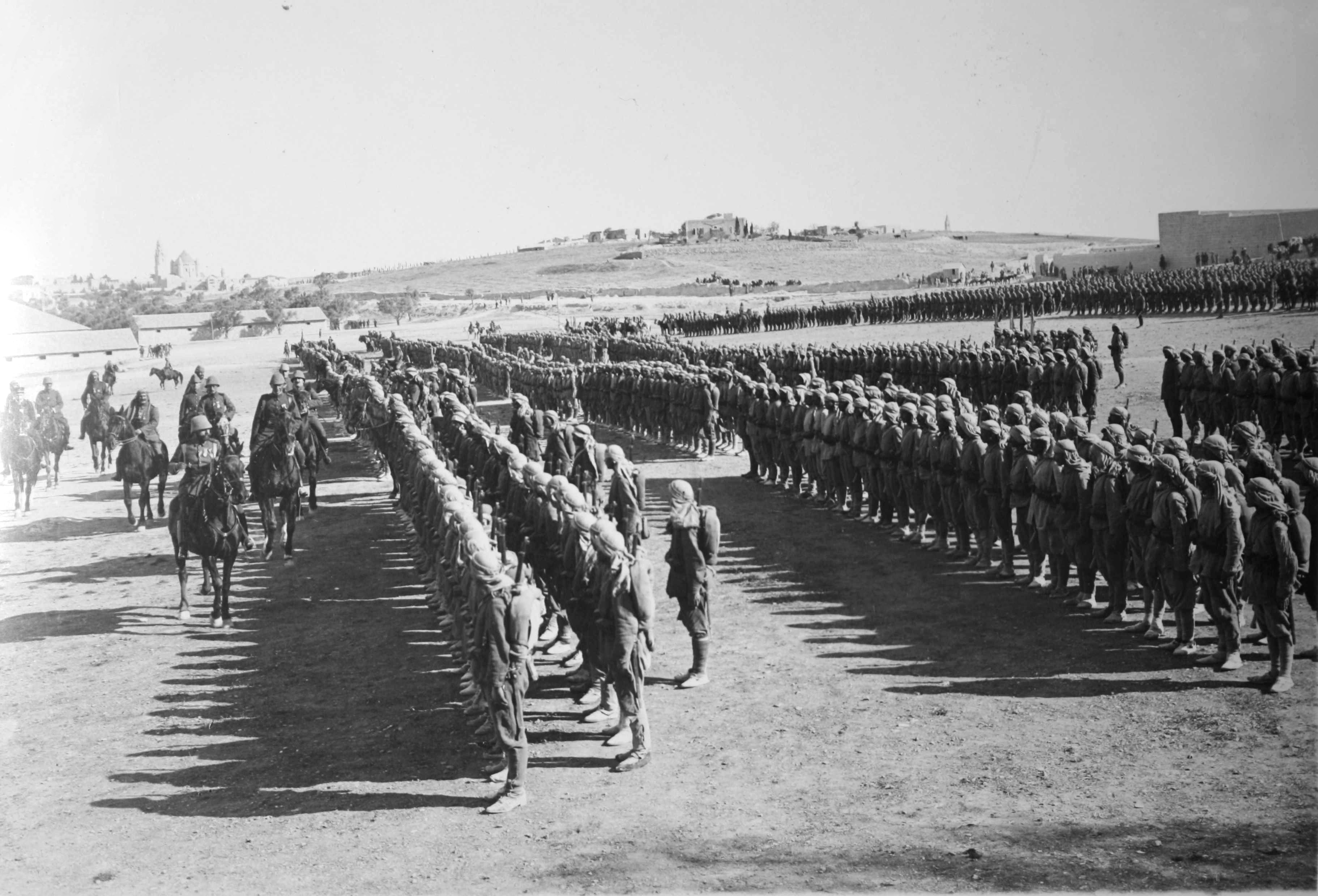
Ottoman troops in Jerusalem

In early 1918, the front line was extended and the Jordan Valley was occupied, following the First Transjordan and the Second Transjordan attacks by British Empire forces in March and April 1918. In March, most of the Egyptian Expeditionary Force's British infantry and Yeomanry cavalry were sent to the Western Front as a consequence of the Spring Offensive. During several months of reorganisation and training, and while Indian Army units replaced the departed troops, a number of attacks were carried out on sections of the Ottoman front line. The reorganised Egyptian Expeditionary Force broke Ottoman forces at the Battle of Megiddo in September 1918. In two days, the British and Indian infantry, supported by a creeping barrage, broke the Ottoman front line and captured the headquarters of the Eighth Army (Ottoman Empire) at Tulkarm, the continuous trench lines at Tabsor, Arara, and the Seventh Army (Ottoman Empire) headquarters at Nablus. In the Jezreel Valley, they captured Nazareth, Afulah and Beisan, Jenin, along with Haifa and Daraa. Samakh and Tiberias on the Sea of Galilee were captured on the way northwards to Damascus. Meanwhile, Chaytor's Force captured the crossings of the Jordan River, Es Salt, Amman and at Ziza most of the Fourth Army (Ottoman Empire). The Armistice of Mudros, signed at the end of October, ended hostilities with the Ottoman Empire when fighting was continuing north of Aleppo.

== German spring offensive (March–July 1918) ==
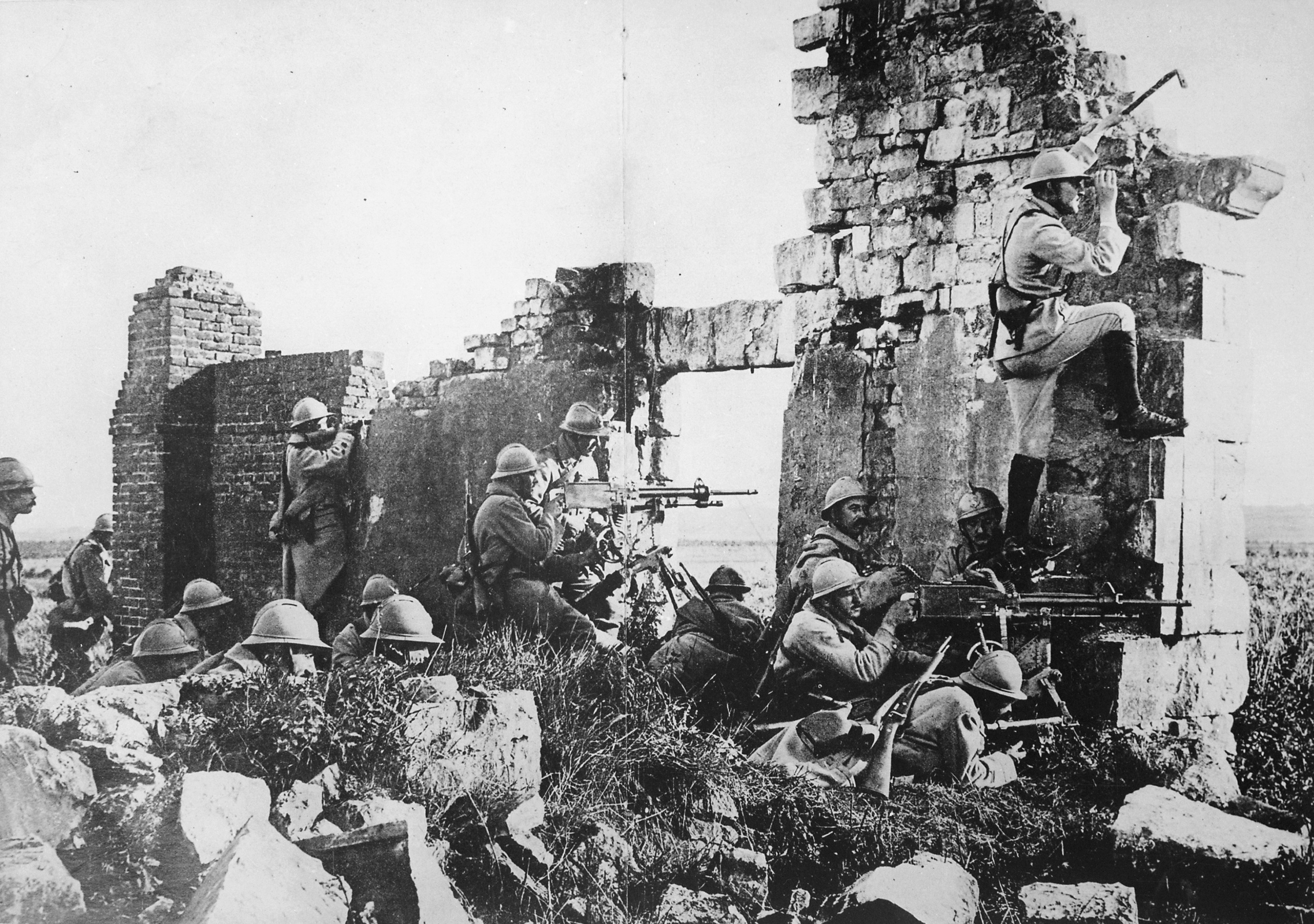
French soldiers under General Gouraud, with machine guns amongst the ruins of a church near the Marne, 1918

In December, the Central Powers signed an armistice with Russia, thus freeing large numbers of German troops for use in the west. With German reinforcements and new American troops pouring in, the outcome was to be decided on the Western Front. The Central Powers knew that they could not win a protracted war, but they held high hopes for success based on a final quick offensive. Furthermore, both sides became increasingly fearful of social unrest and revolution in Europe. Thus, both sides urgently sought a decisive victory.

Ludendorff drew up plans (codenamed Operation Michael) for the 1918 offensive on the Western Front. The spring offensive sought to divide the British and French forces with a series of feints and advances. The German leadership hoped to end the war before significant US forces arrived. The operation commenced on 21 March 1918 with an attack on British forces near Saint-Quentin. German forces achieved an unprecedented advance of 60 kilometres (37 mi).

British and French trenches were penetrated using novel infiltration tactics, also named Hutier tactics after General Oskar von Hutier, by specially trained units called stormtroopers. Previously, attacks had been characterised by long artillery bombardments and massed assaults. In the spring offensive of 1918, however, Ludendorff used artillery only briefly and infiltrated small groups of infantry at weak points. They attacked command and logistics areas and bypassed points of serious resistance. More heavily armed infantry then destroyed these isolated positions. This German success relied greatly on the element of surprise.

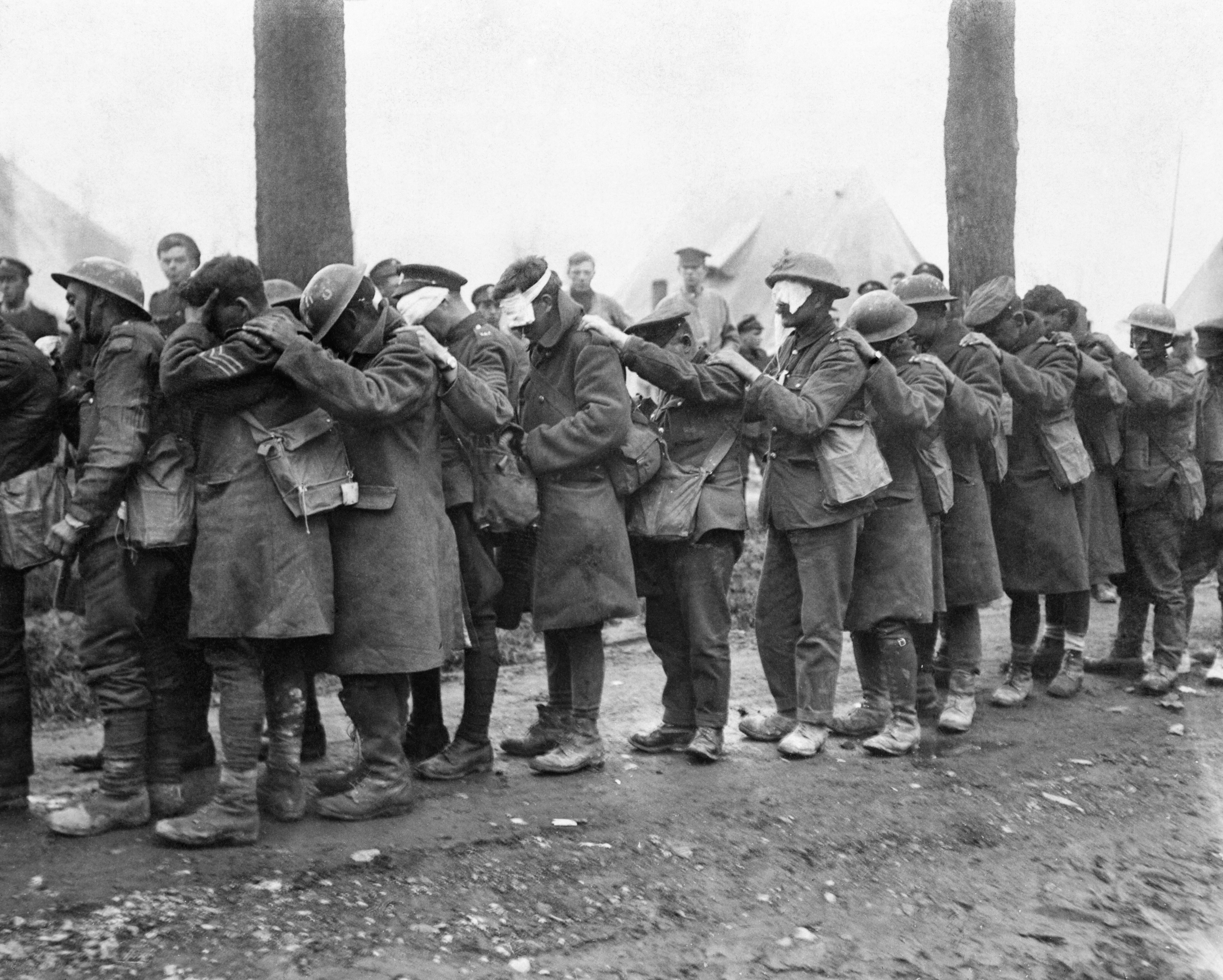
British 55th (West Lancashire) Division soldiers blinded by tear gas during the Battle of Estaires, 10 April 1918

The front moved to within 120 kilometres (75 mi) of Paris. Three heavy Krupp railway guns fired 183 shells on the capital, causing many Parisians to flee. The initial offensive was so successful that Kaiser Wilhelm II declared 24 March a national holiday. Many Germans thought victory was near. After heavy fighting, however, the offensive was halted. Lacking tanks or motorised artillery, the Germans were unable to consolidate their gains. The problems of re-supply were also exacerbated by increasing distances that now stretched over terrain that was shell-torn and often impassable to traffic.

Following Operation Michael, Germany launched Operation Georgette against the northern English Channel ports. The Allies halted the drive after limited territorial gains by Germany. The German Army to the south then conducted Operations Blücher and Yorck, pushing broadly towards Paris. Germany launched Operation Marne (Second Battle of the Marne) on 15 July, in an attempt to encircle Reims. The resulting counter-attack, which started the Hundred Days Offensive, marked the first successful Allied offensive of the war. By 20 July, the Germans had retreated across the Marne to their starting lines, having achieved little, and the German Army never regained the initiative. German casualties between March and April 1918 were 270,000, including many highly trained stormtroopers.

Meanwhile, Germany was falling apart at home. Anti-war marches became frequent and morale in the army fell. Industrial output was half the 1913 levels.

== Hundred Days Offensive (August–November 1918) ==
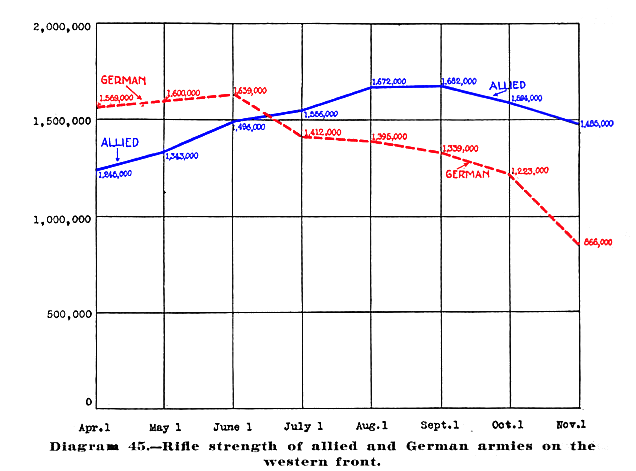
Between April and November 1918, the Allies increased their front-line rifle strength while German strength fell by half.

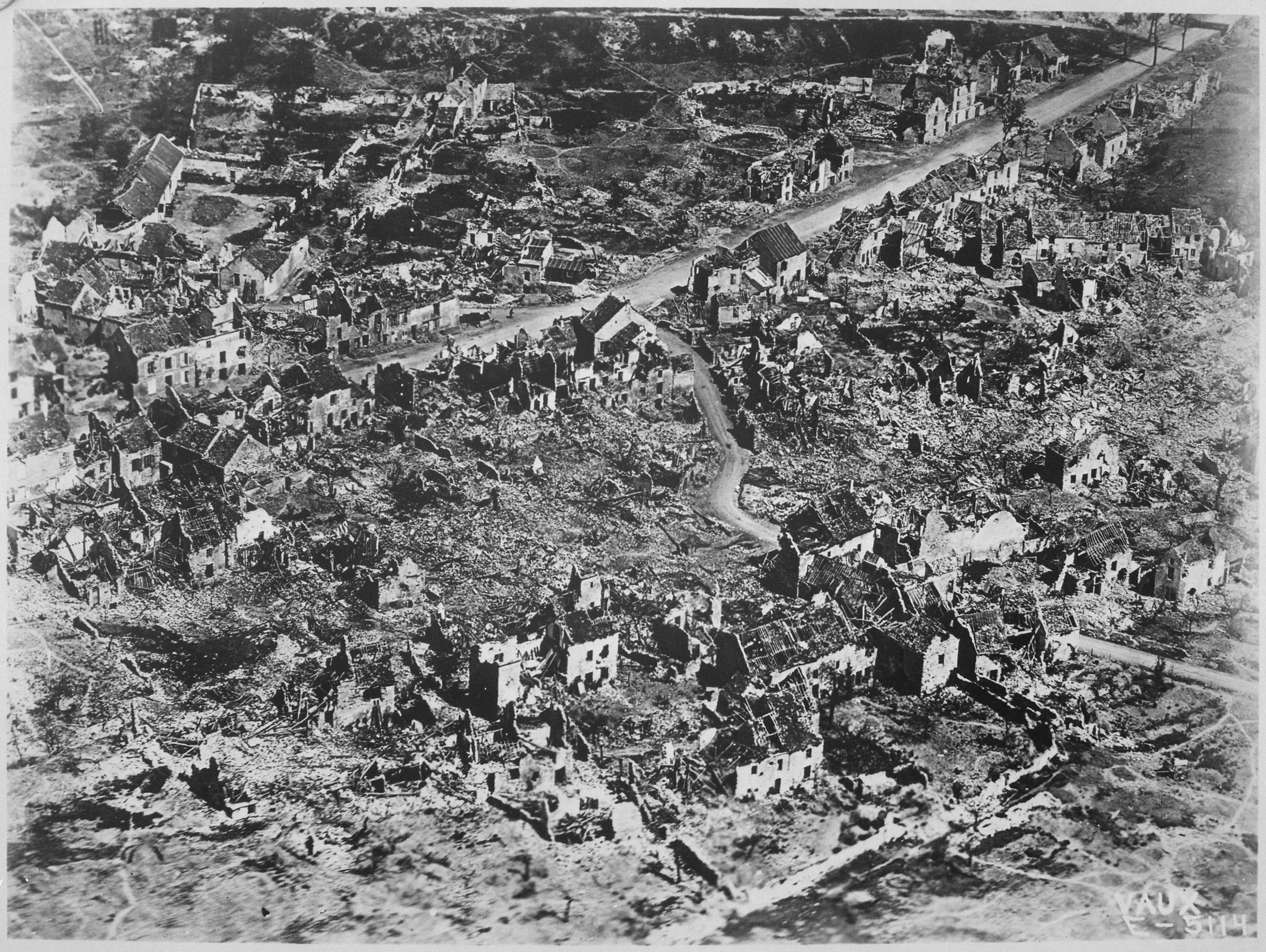
Aerial view of ruins of Vaux-devant-Damloup, France, 1918

The Allied counteroffensive, known as the Hundred Days Offensive, began on 8 August 1918, with the Battle of Amiens. The battle involved over 400 tanks and 120,000 British, Dominion, and French troops, and by the end of its first day a gap 24 kilometres (15 mi) long had been created in the German lines. The defenders displayed a marked collapse in morale, causing Ludendorff to refer to this day as the "Black Day of the German army". After an advance as far as 23 kilometres (14 mi), German resistance stiffened, and the battle was concluded on 12 August.

Rather than continuing the Amiens battle past the point of initial success, as had been done so many times in the past, the Allies shifted attention elsewhere. Allied leaders had now realised that to continue an attack after resistance had hardened was a waste of lives, and it was better to turn a line than to try to roll over it. They began to undertake attacks in quick order to take advantage of successful advances on the flanks, then broke them off when each attack lost its initial impetus.

The day after the Offensive began, Ludendorff said: "We cannot win the war any more, but we must not lose it either." On 11 August, he offered his resignation to the Kaiser, who refused it, replying, "I see that we must strike a balance. We have nearly reached the limit of our powers of resistance. The war must be ended." On 13 August, at Spa, Hindenburg, Ludendorff, the Chancellor, and Foreign Minister Hintz agreed that the war could not be ended militarily and, on the following day, the German Crown Council decided that victory in the field was now most improbable. Austria and Hungary warned that they could continue the war only until December, and Ludendorff recommended immediate peace negotiations. Prince Rupprecht warned Prince Maximilian of Baden: "Our military situation has deteriorated so rapidly that I no longer believe we can hold out over the winter; it is even possible that a catastrophe will come earlier."

=== Battle of Albert ===
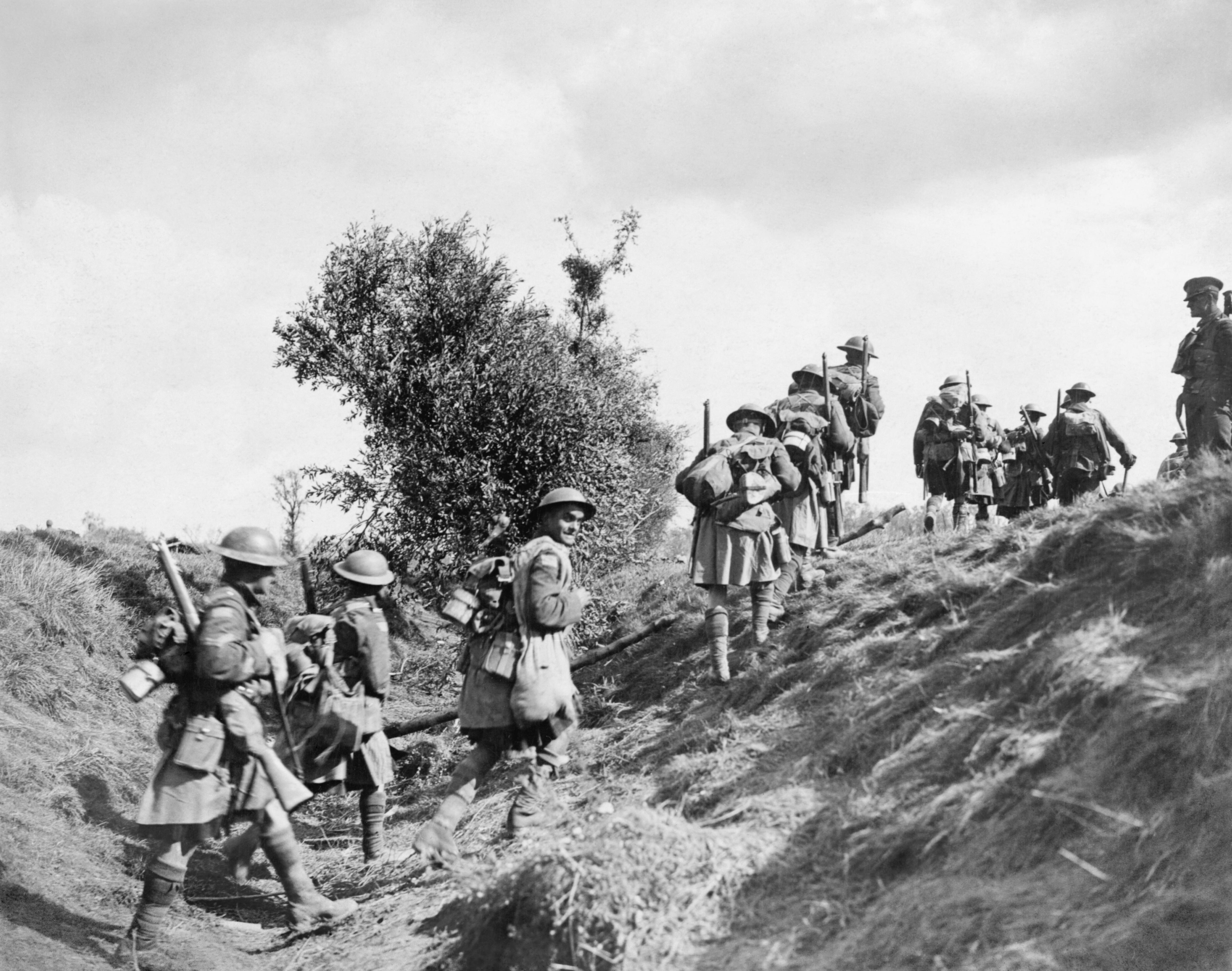
16th Bn (Canadian Scottish), advancing during the Battle of the Canal du Nord, 1918

British and Dominion forces launched the next phase of the campaign with the Battle of Albert on 21 August. The assault was widened by French and then further British forces in the following days. During the last week of August, the Allied pressure along a 110-kilometre (68 mi) front against the enemy was heavy and unrelenting. From German accounts, "Each day was spent in bloody fighting against an ever and again on-storming enemy, and nights passed without sleep in retirements to new lines."

Faced with these advances, on 2 September the German Oberste Heeresleitung ("Supreme Army Command") issued orders to withdraw in the south to the Hindenburg Line. This ceded without a fight the salient seized the previous April. According to Ludendorff, "We had to admit the necessity ... to withdraw the entire front from the Scarpe to the Vesle." In nearly four weeks of fighting beginning on 8 August, over 100,000 German prisoners were taken. The German High Command realised that the war was lost and made attempts to reach a satisfactory end. On 10 September Hindenburg urged peace moves to Emperor Charles of Austria, and Germany appealed to the Netherlands for mediation. On 14 September Austria sent a note to all belligerents and neutrals suggesting a meeting for peace talks on neutral soil, and on 15 September Germany made a peace offer to Belgium. Both peace offers were rejected.

=== Allied advance to the Hindenburg Line ===
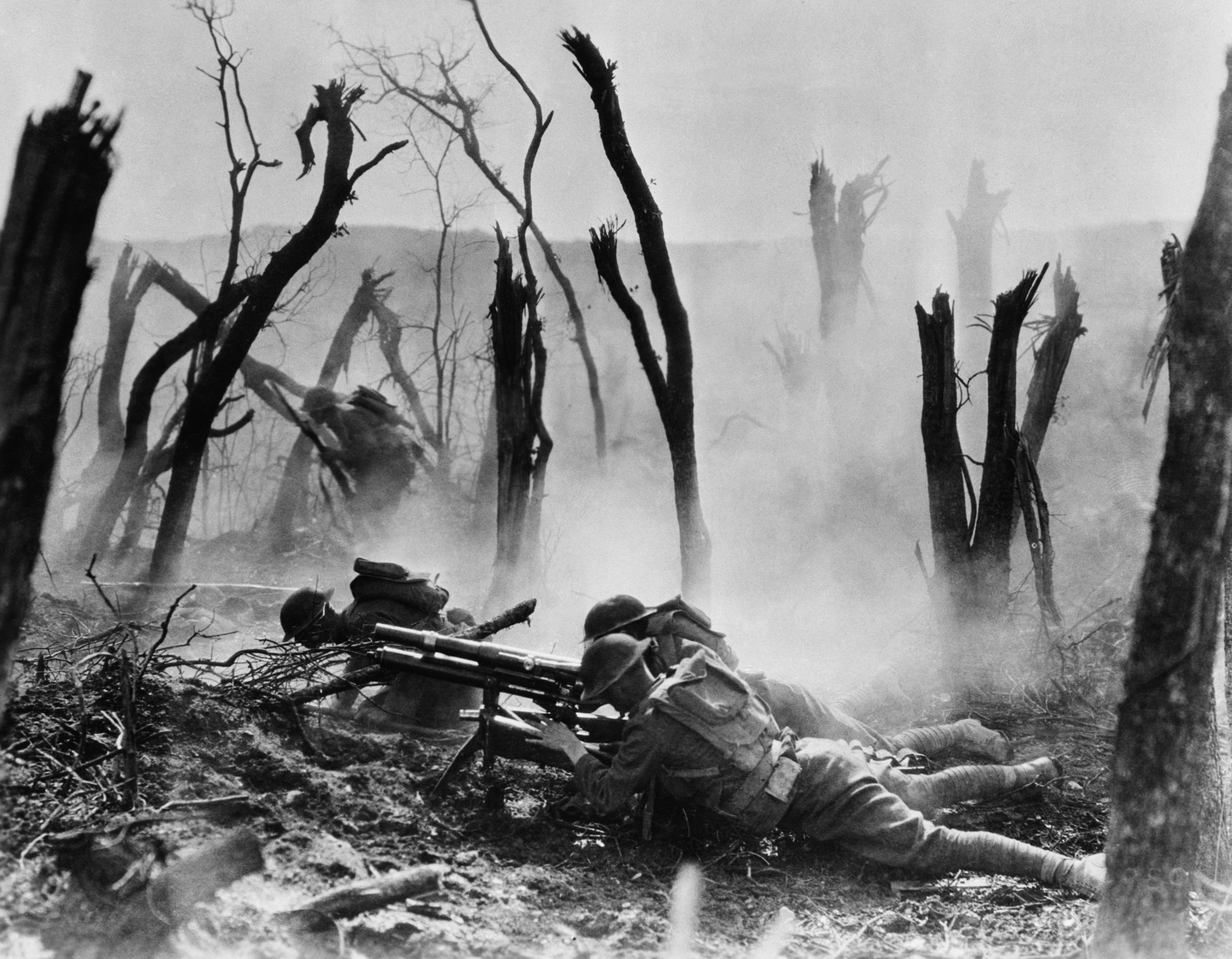
An American gun crew from the 23rd Infantry, 2nd Division, firing on German entrenched positions during the Meuse-Argonne offensive, 1918

In September the Allies advanced to the Hindenburg Line in the north and centre. The Germans continued to fight strong rear-guard actions and launched numerous counterattacks, but positions and outposts of the Line continued to fall, with the BEF alone taking 30,441 prisoners in the last week of September. On 24 September an assault by both the British and French came within 3 kilometres (2 mi) of St. Quentin. The Germans had now retreated to positions along or behind the Hindenburg Line. That same day, Supreme Army Command informed the leaders in Berlin that armistice talks were inevitable.

The final assault on the Hindenburg Line began with the Meuse-Argonne offensive, launched by American and French troops on 26 September. The following week, co-operating American and French units broke through in Champagne at the Battle of Blanc Mont Ridge, forcing the Germans off the commanding heights, and closing towards the Belgian frontier. On 8 October the line was pierced again by British and Dominion troops at the Battle of Cambrai. The German army had to shorten its front and use the Dutch frontier as an anchor to fight rear-guard actions as it fell back towards Germany.

When Bulgaria signed a separate armistice on 29 September, Ludendorff, having been under great stress for months, suffered something similar to a breakdown. It was evident that Germany could no longer mount a successful defence. The collapse of the Balkans meant that Germany was about to lose its main supplies of oil and food. Its reserves had been used up, even as US troops kept arriving at the rate of 10,000 per day.

== Breakthrough of Macedonian Front (September 1918) ==
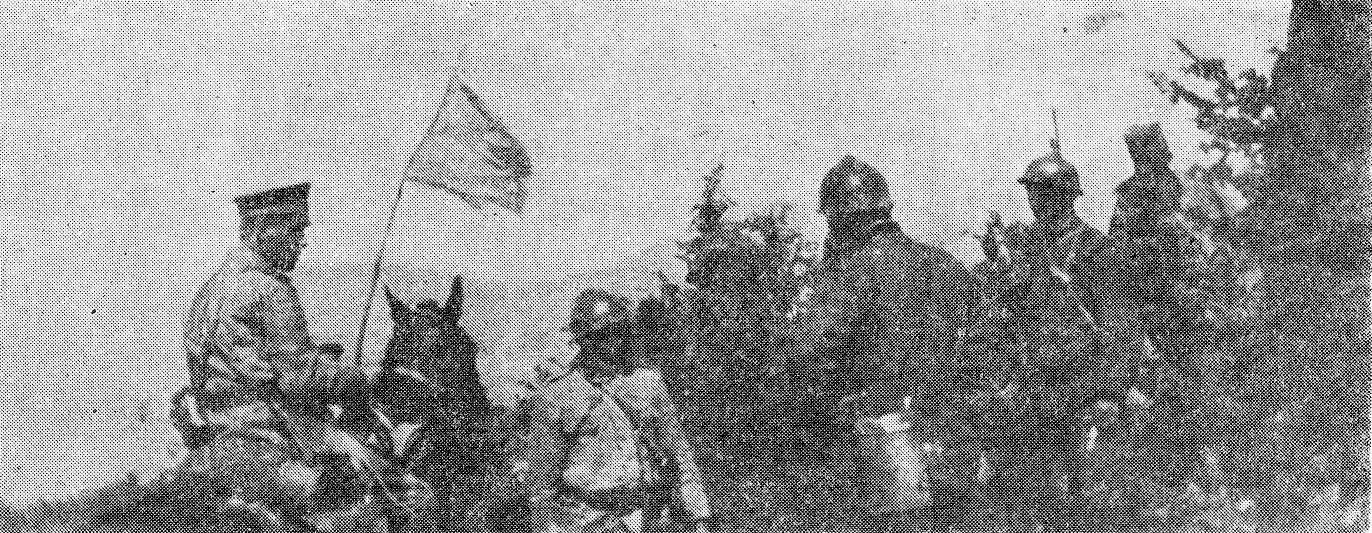
Bulgarian major Ivanov with white flag surrendering to Serbian 7th Danube regiment near Kumanovo

Allied forces started the Vardar offensive on 15 September at two key points: Dobro Pole and near Dojran Lake. In the Battle of Dobro Pole, the Serbian and French armies had success after a three day long battle with relatively small casualties, and subsequently made a breakthrough in the front, something which was rarely seen in World War I. After the front was broken, Allied forces started to liberate Serbia and reached Skopje at 29 September after which Bulgaria signed an armistice with the Allies on 30 September.

Allied armies continued the liberation of Serbia while Germany unsuccessfully tried to establish new front lines near Niš by sending troops from Romania. After the Serbian army entered Niš on 11 October, Germany left Austro-Hungary to organize the Balkan front. On 1 November Serbian forces liberated Belgrade and started to cross over the border with Austria-Hungary. Austria-Hungary was politically disintegrating and signed an armistice with Italy on 3 November, leaving Germany alone in Europe. On 6 November the Serbian Army liberated Sarajevo and Novi Sad on 9 November. The non-German peoples of Austria-Hungary started to organize independent states in the territory of Austria-Hungary, which it was unable to prevent.

== German Revolution (1918–1919) ==
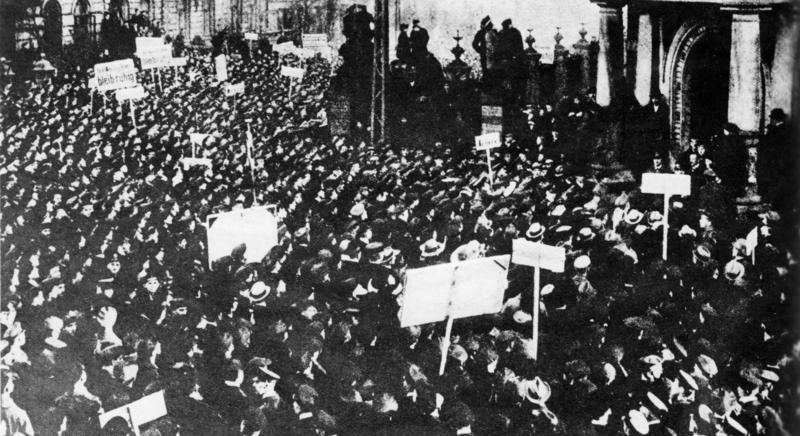
German Revolution, Kiel, 1918

News of Germany's impending military defeat spread throughout the German armed forces. The threat of mutiny was rife. Admiral Reinhard Scheer and Ludendorff decided to launch a last attempt to restore the "valour" of the German Navy.

In northern Germany, the German Revolution of 1918–1919 began at the end of October 1918. Units of the German Navy refused to set sail for a last, large-scale operation in a war they believed to be as good as lost, initiating the uprising. The sailors' revolt, which then ensued in the naval ports of Wilhelmshaven and Kiel, spread across the whole country within days and led to the proclamation of a republic on 9 November 1918, shortly thereafter to the abdication of Kaiser Wilhelm II, and to German surrender.

== Armistices and capitulations ==
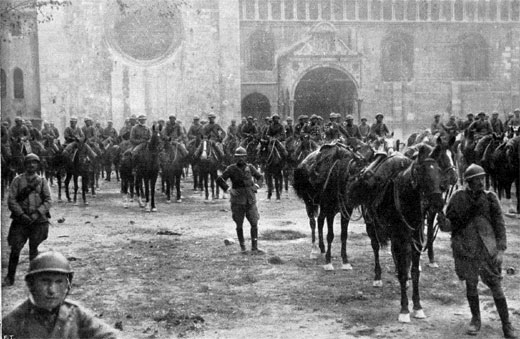
Italian troops reach Trento during the Battle of Vittorio Veneto, 1918. Italy's victory marked the end of the war on the Italian Front and secured the dissolution of the Austro-Hungarian Empire.

The collapse of the Central Powers came swiftly. Bulgaria was the first to sign an armistice, the Armistice of Salonica on 29 September 1918. German Emperor Wilhelm II in his telegram to Bulgarian Tsar Ferdinand I described the situation thus: "Disgraceful! 62,000 Serbs decided the war!". On the same day, the German Supreme Army Command informed Kaiser Wilhelm II and the Imperial Chancellor Count Georg von Hertling, that the military situation facing Germany was hopeless.

On 24 October, the Italians began a push that rapidly recovered territory lost after the Battle of Caporetto. This culminated in the Battle of Vittorio Veneto, which marked the end of the Austro-Hungarian Army as an effective fighting force. The offensive also triggered the disintegration of the Austro-Hungarian Empire. During the last week of October, declarations of independence were made in Budapest, Prague, and Zagreb. On 29 October, the imperial authorities asked Italy for an armistice, but the Italians continued advancing, reaching Trento, Udine, and Trieste. On 3 November, Austria-Hungary sent a flag of truce to ask for an armistice (Armistice of Villa Giusti). The terms, arranged by telegraph with the Allied Authorities in Paris, were communicated to the Austrian commander and accepted. The Armistice with Austria was signed in the Villa Giusti, near Padua, on 3 November. Austria and Hungary signed separate armistices following the overthrow of the Habsburg monarchy. In the following days, the Italian Army occupied Innsbruck and all Tyrol with over 20,000 soldiers.

On 30 October, the Ottoman Empire capitulated, signing the Armistice of Mudros.

=== New German government surrenders ===
With the military faltering and with widespread loss of confidence in the Kaiser leading to his abdication and fleeing of the country, Germany moved towards surrender. Prince Maximilian of Baden took charge of a new government on 3 October as Chancellor of Germany to negotiate with the Allies. Negotiations with President Wilson began immediately, in the hope that he would offer better terms than the British and French. Wilson demanded a constitutional monarchy and parliamentary control over the German military. There was no resistance when the Social Democrat Philipp Scheidemann on 9 November declared Germany to be a republic. The Kaiser, kings and other hereditary rulers all were removed from power and Wilhelm fled to exile in the Netherlands. It was the end of Imperial Germany; a new Germany had been born as the Weimar Republic.

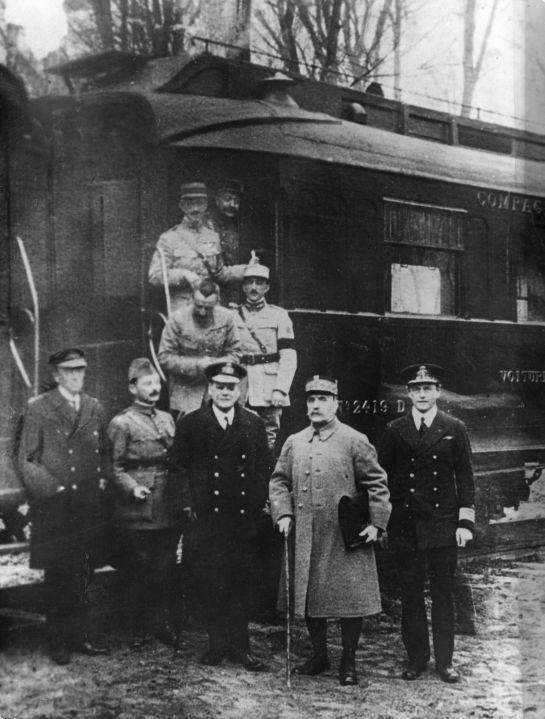
Ferdinand Foch, second from right, pictured outside the carriage in Compiègne after agreeing to the armistice that ended the war there. The carriage was later chosen by Nazi Germany as the symbolic setting of Pétain's June 1940 armistice.

On 11 November, at 5:00 am, an armistice with Germany was signed in a railroad carriage at Compiègne. At 11 am on 11 November 1918—"the eleventh hour of the eleventh day of the eleventh month"—a ceasefire came into effect. During the six hours between the signing of the armistice and its taking effect, opposing armies on the Western Front began to withdraw from their positions, but fighting continued along many areas of the front, as commanders wanted to capture territory before the war ended. The occupation of the Rhineland took place following the Armistice. The occupying armies consisted of American, Belgian, British and French forces.

In November 1918, the Allies had ample supplies of manpower and materiel to invade Germany. Yet at the time of the armistice, no Allied force had crossed the German frontier, the Western Front was still some 720 kilometres (450 mi) from Berlin, and the Kaiser's armies had retreated from the battlefield in good order. These factors enabled Hindenburg and other senior German leaders to spread the story that their armies had not really been defeated. This resulted in the stab-in-the-back myth, which attributed Germany's defeat not to its inability to continue fighting (even though up to a million soldiers were suffering from the 1918 flu pandemic and unfit to fight), but to the public's failure to respond to its "patriotic calling" and the supposed sabotage of the war effort, particularly by Jews, Socialists, and Bolsheviks.

The Allies had much more potential wealth they could spend on the war. One estimate (using 1913 US dollars) is that the Allies spent $58 billion on the war and the Central Powers only $25 billion. Among the Allies, the UK spent $21 billion and the US$17 billion; among the Central Powers Germany spent $20 billion.

== See also ==
- Timeline of World War I

== Bibliography ==
- Axelrod, Alan (2018). How America Won World War I. Rowman & Littlefield. ISBN 978-1-4930-3192-4.
- Ayers, Leonard Porter (1919). The War with Germany: A Statistical Summary. Government Printing Office.
- Baker, Kevin (June 2006). "Stabbed in the Back! The past and future of a right-wing myth". Harper's Magazine.
- Beckett, Ian (2007). The Great War. Longman. ISBN 978-1-4058-1252-8.
- Chickering, Rodger (2004). Imperial Germany and the Great War, 1914–1918. Cambridge: Cambridge University Press. ISBN 978-0-521-83908-2. OCLC 55523473.
- Christie, Norm M (1997). The Canadians at Cambrai and the Canal du Nord, August–September 1918. CEF Books. ISBN 978-1-896979-18-2.
- Clayton, Anthony (2003). Paths of Glory; the French Army 1914–1918. Cassell. ISBN 978-0-304-35949-3.
- Erickson, Edward J. (2001). Ordered to Die: A History of the Ottoman Army in the First World War. Contributions in Military Studies. Vol. 201. Westport, Connecticut: Greenwood Press. ISBN 978-0-313-31516-9. OCLC 43481698.
- Gilbert, Martin (1994). First World War. Stoddart Publishing. ISBN 978-0-7737-2848-6.
- Gray, Randal; Argyle, Christopher (1990). Chronicle of the First World War. New York: Facts on File. ISBN 978-0-8160-2595-4. OCLC 19398100.
- Gray, Randal (1991). Kaiserschlacht 1918: the final German offensive. Osprey. ISBN 978-1-85532-157-1.
- Grotelueschen, Mark Ethan (2006). The AEF Way of War: The American Army and Combat in World War I. Cambridge University Press. ISBN 978-0-521-86434-3.
- Heyman, Neil M. (1997). World War I. Guides to historic events of the twentieth century. Westport, Connecticut: Greenwood Press. ISBN 978-0-313-29880-6. OCLC 36292837.
- Horne, Alistair (1981) [1964]. The Price of Glory: Verdun 1916 (Abridged ed.). Penguin. ISBN 978-0-14-002215-5.
- Hull, Isabel Virginia (2006). Absolute destruction: military culture and the practices of war in Imperial Germany. Cornell University Press. ISBN 978-0-8014-7293-0.
- Humphries, Mark Osborne (2007). ""Old Wine in New Bottles": A Comparison of British and Canadian Preparations for the Battle of Arras". In Hayes, Geoffrey; Iarocci, Andrew; Bechthold, Mike (eds.). Vimy Ridge: A Canadian Reassessment. Waterloo: Wilfrid Laurier University Press. ISBN 978-0-88920-508-6.
- Inglis, David (1995). Vimy Ridge: 1917–1992, A Canadian Myth over Seventy Five Years (PDF). Burnaby: Simon Fraser University. Archived (PDF) from the original on 16 September 2018.
- Kurlander, Eric (2006). Steffen Bruendel. Volksgemeinschaft oder Volksstaat: Die "Ideen von 1914" und die Neuordnung Deutschlands im Ersten Weltkrieg. H-net. Archived from the original (Book review) on 10 June 2007.
- Ludendorff, Erich (1919). My War Memories, 1914–1918. OCLC 60104290. also published by Harper as "Ludendorff's Own Story, August 1914 – November 1918: The Great War from the Siege of Liège to the Signing of the Armistice as Viewed from the Grand Headquarters of the German Army" OCLC 561160 (original title Meine Kriegserinnerungen, 1914–1918)
- Marshall, S. L. A.; Josephy, Alvin M. (1982). The American heritage history of World War I. American Heritage Pub. Co. : Bonanza Books : Distributed by Crown Publishers. ISBN 978-0-517-38555-5. OCLC 1028047398.
- McLellan, Edwin N. The United States Marine Corps in the World War. Archived from the original on 16 September 2018.
- Millett, Allan Reed; Murray, Williamson (1988). Military Effectiveness. Boston: Allen Unwin. ISBN 978-0-04-445053-5. OCLC 220072268.
- Nicholson, Gerald W.L. (1962). Canadian Expeditionary Force, 1914–1919: Official History of the Canadian Army in the First World War. Ottawa: Queens Printer and Controller of Stationery. OCLC 2317262. Archived from the original on 16 May 2007.
- Pitt, Barrie (2003). 1918: The Last Act. Barnsley: Pen and Sword. ISBN 978-0-85052-974-6. OCLC 56468232.
- Rickard, J. (5 March 2001). "Erich von Ludendorff [sic], 1865–1937, German General". Military History Encyclopedia on the Web. Archived from the original on 10 January 2008.
- Rickard, J. (27 August 2007). "The Ludendorff Offensives, 21 March–18 July 1918". historyofwar.org. Archived from the original on 10 October 2017.
- Shanafelt, Gary W. (1985). The secret enemy: Austria-Hungary and the German alliance, 1914–1918. East European Monographs. ISBN 978-0-88033-080-0.
- Stevenson, David (2004). Cataclysm: The First World War as Political Tragedy. New York: Basic Books. p. 560. ISBN 978-0-465-08184-4. OCLC 54001282.
- Stevenson, David (2012). 1914–1918: The History of the First World War. Penguin. ISBN 978-0-7181-9795-7.
- Strachan, Hew (2003). The First World War: Volume I: To Arms. New York: Viking. ISBN 978-0-670-03295-2. OCLC 53075929.
- Terraine, John (1963). Ordeal of Victory. J.B. Lippincott. ISBN 978-0-09-068120-4. OCLC 1345833.
- Westwell, Ian (2004). World War I Day by Day. St. Paul, Minnesota: MBI Publishing. pp. 192pp. ISBN 978-0-7603-1937-6. OCLC 57533366.
- Wheeler-Bennett, John W. (1938). Brest-Litovsk: The forgotten peace. Macmillan.
- Winter, Jay, ed. (2014). The Cambridge History of the First World War (2016 ed.). Cambridge University Press. ISBN 978-1-316-60066-5.
