= Eric Gore-Browne =

English cricketer and British Army officer (1890–1918)

Personal information
- Full name: Eric Antony Rollo Gore-Browne
- Born: 13 June 1890; Ryde, Isle of Wight, England
- Died: 3 July 1918 (aged 28); Namacurra, Zambezia Province, Portuguese East Africa
- Batting: Unknown
- Bowling: Unknown

Domestic team information
- Years: Team
- 1912/13: Europeans

Career statistics
Competition	First-class
Matches	1
Runs scored	12
Batting average	6.00
100s/50s	–/–
Top score	12
Balls bowled	24
Wickets	0
Bowling average	–
5 wickets in innings	–
10 wickets in match	–
Best bowling	–
Catches/stumpings	–/–
- Source: ESPNcricinfo, 8 October 2020

Eric Antony Rollo Gore-Browne (13 June 1890 – 3 July 1918) was an English first-class cricketer and British Army officer who was killed in action in the First World War.

== Early life and education ==
Gore-Browne was the son of the Rev. Robert Melvill Gore-Brown (son of Rt. Rev. Harold Browne) and his wife Hon. Agnes Catharine Rollo, daughter of John, 10th Lord Rollo. He was born at Ryde on the Isle of Wight in June 1890. He was educated firstly in Hampshire at Twyford School and Eastam's School at Southsea. From there he attended Oundle School in Northamptonshire. After completing his education, Gore-Browne decided on a career in the British Army and attended the Royal Military College, Sandhurst.

== Military career ==
He graduated as a second lieutenant into the Dorsetshire Regiment. He spent some time with the regiment in British India, during which he was promoted to lieutenant.

Gore-Brown was seconded to the King's African Rifles in December 1913. He served with the Rifles in the First World War, during which he was promoted to captain in April 1915. He was wounded in action on 21 September 1915 at Longido in German East Africa. He was evacuated 70 miles (110 km) by stretcher and mule cart to where he was treated for his wounds. Upon his recovery he trained troops in Nairobi and was decorated with the Croix de guerre for his work in training troops in Nairobi and other places in East Africa. He had returned to active service by early 1918, where he commanded the fort at Namacurra in Portuguese East Africa. The fort came under attack from 1–3 July by a superior German force commanded by Paul von Lettow-Vorbeck. Seeing little option but to retreat, Gore-Browne ordered an orderly withdrawal of his forces toward a wide stream where he hoped to take up stronger defensive positions on its opposite bank. However, the retreat was not orderly and the troops under his command panicked. In the chaos nearly half of his force were either shot by the pursuing German forces, drowned, or were attacked by crocodiles. Gore-Browne himself drowned during the rout.

== Cricket career ==
While in India, he made a single appearance in first-class cricket for the Europeans cricket team against the Parsees at Poona in the 1912/13 Bombay Presidency Match. Batting twice in the match, he was dismissed for 12 runs by M. D. Parekh in the Europeans first innings, while in their second innings he was dismissed without scoring by J. N. Elavia.
