= Pandanus petersii =

Conservation status
- Vulnerable (IUCN 2.3)

Scientific classification
- Kingdom: Plantae
- Clade: Tracheophytes
- Clade: Angiosperms
- Clade: Monocots
- Order: Pandanales
- Family: Pandanaceae
- Genus: Pandanus
- Species: P. petersii

Binomial name
- Pandanus petersii Warb.

Species of flowering plant

Pandanus petersii is a species of plant in the family Pandanaceae. It is endemic to Mozambique; its habitat ranges from Namacurra to Quelimane and the Zambezi Delta. Typical features of its habitat are woodland remnants in swampy or wetland places. It is threatened by habitat loss.
