= Askari =

Local soldier of a colonial army in Africa

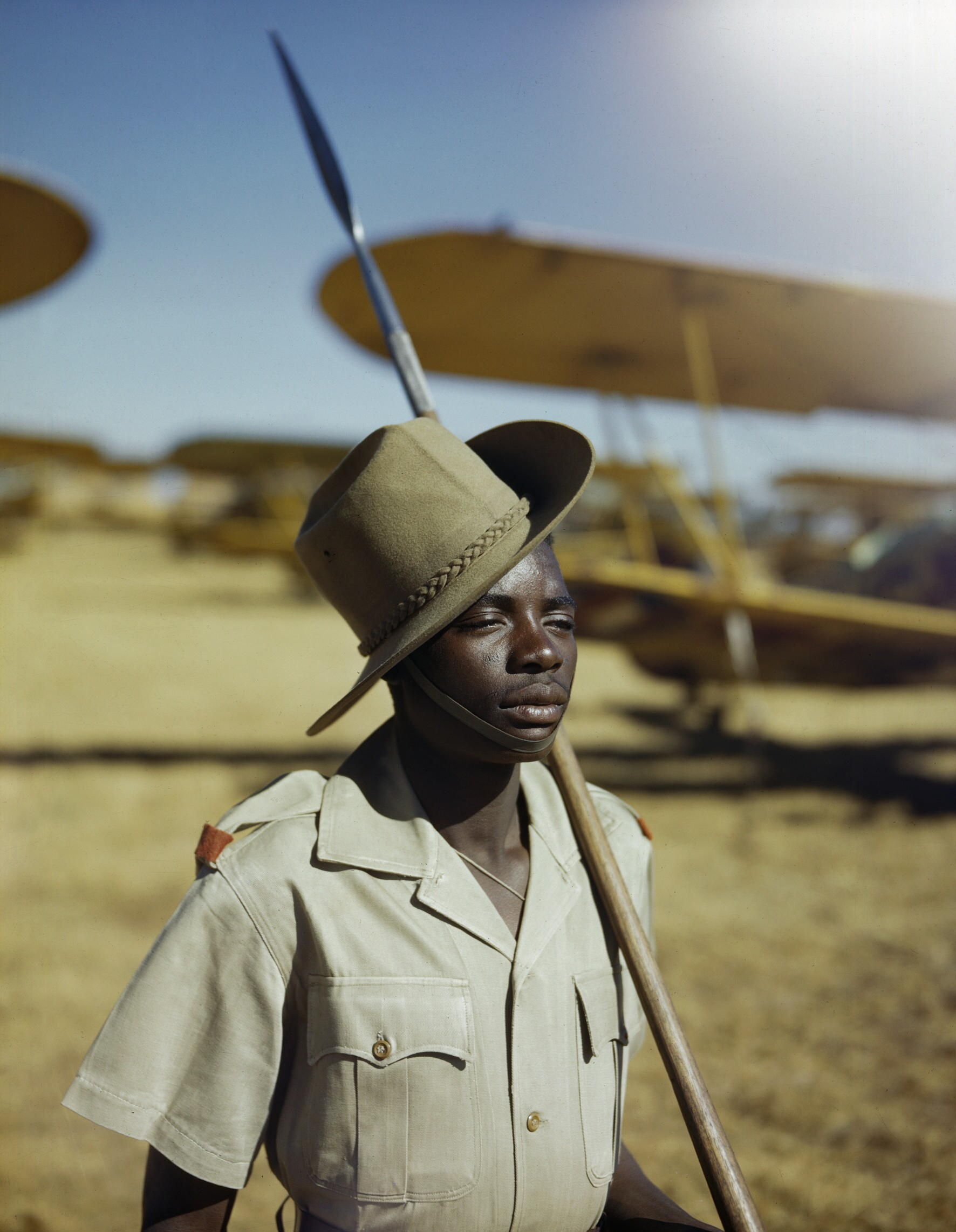
An askari with an assegai at AFB Waterkloof, Pretoria, South Africa, January 1943.

An askari or ascari (from Swahili, and Arabic عسكري, ʿaskarī, meaning 'soldier' or 'military', also 'police' in Somali) was a local soldier serving in the armies of the European colonial powers in Africa, particularly in the African Great Lakes, Northeast Africa and Central Africa. The word is used in this sense in English, as well as in German, Italian, Urdu, and Portuguese. In French, the word is used only in reference to native troops outside the French colonial empire. The designation is still in occasional use today to informally describe police, gendarmerie and security guards.

During the period of the European colonial empires in Africa, locally recruited soldiers designated as askaris were employed by the Italian, British, Portuguese, German and Belgian colonial armies. They played a crucial role in the conquest of the various colonial possessions, and subsequently served as garrison and internal security forces. During both World Wars, askari units also served outside their colonies of origin, in various parts of Africa, the Middle East, and Asia. In South Africa the term refers to former members of the liberation movements who defected to the Apartheid government security forces.

== Etymology ==
Askari is a loan word from Persian عسكري ('ʿaskarī') 'soldier'. The Persian word is a derivation from the Middle Persian word lashkar 'army'.

The word lashkar is the root of the word lascar for a South Asian soldier or a person of South Asian origin. Words for '(regular) soldier' derived from these words are found in Azeri, Arabic, Indonesian, Malay, Somali, Swahili, Turkish, and Urdu.

== Belgian colonies ==
In the Belgian Congo, the askaris were organised into a combined military and police force, which was commanded by Belgian officers and both native and white non commissioned officers.

== British colonies ==
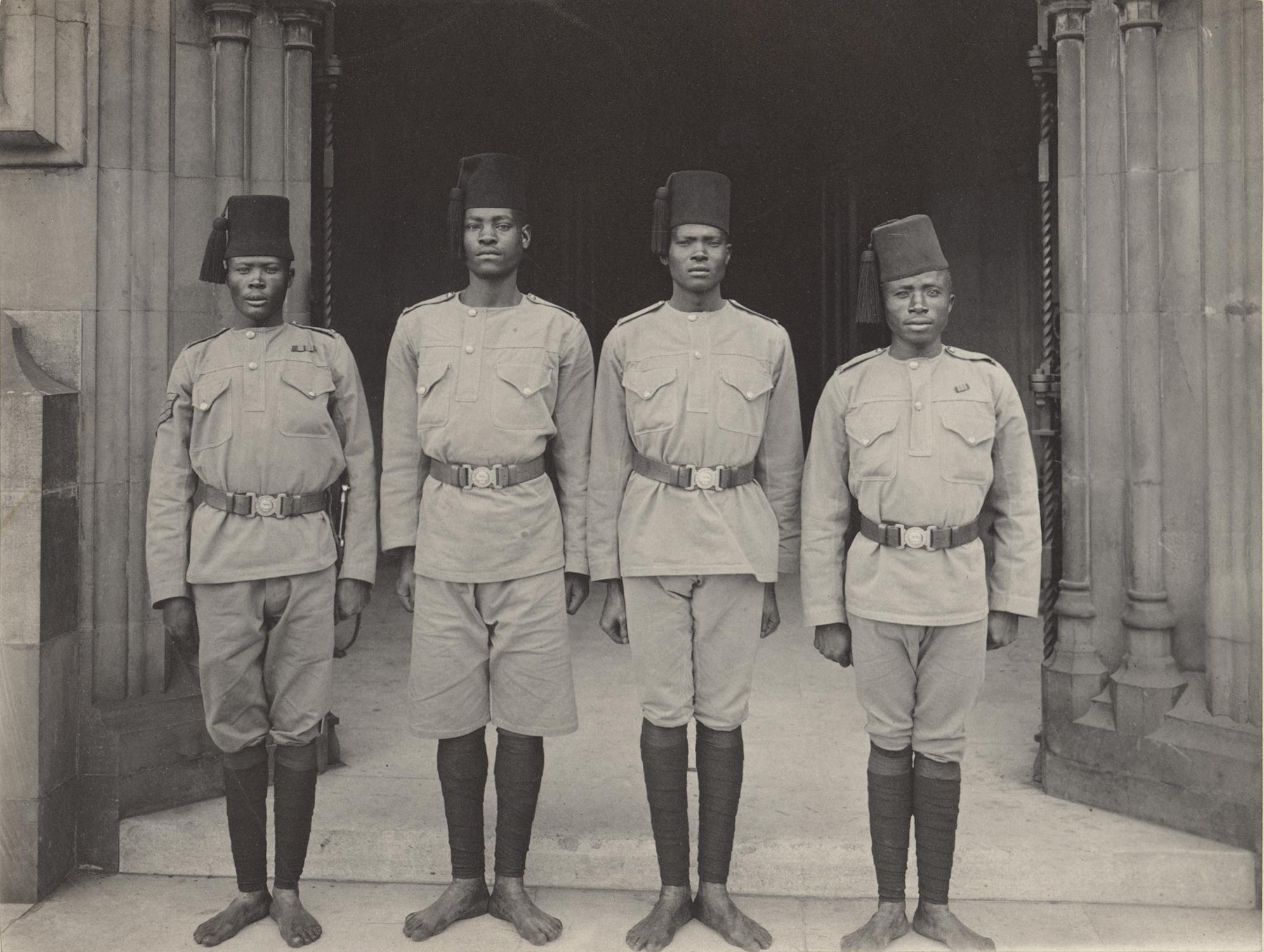
Soldiers of the King's African Rifles at the coronation of Edward VII in 1902

The Imperial British East Africa Company (1888 – 1896) raised units of askaris from among the Swahili people, the Sudanese and Somalis. There was no official uniform, nor standardised weaponry. Many of the askaris campaigned in their native dress. Officers usually wore civilian clothes.

From 1895 the British askaris were organised into a regular, disciplined and uniformed force called the East Africa Rifles, later forming part of the multi-battalion King's African Rifles. The designation of "askari" was retained for locally recruited troops in the King's African Rifles, smaller military units and police forces in the colonies until the end of colonial rule in Kenya, Tanganyika and Uganda during the period 1961–63. After independence, the term Askari continued to be used to refer to soldiers in former British colonies.

== German colonies ==
The colonial army (Schutztruppe) of the German Empire employed native troops with European officers and NCOs in its colonies. The main concentration of such locally recruited troops was in German East Africa (now Tanzania), formed in 1891 after the transfer of the Wissmanntruppe (raised in 1889 to suppress the Abushiri Revolt) to German imperial control.

The first askaris formed in German East Africa were raised by DOAG (Deutsche Ost-Afrika Gesellschaft—the German East Africa Company) in about 1888. Originally drawn from Sudanese mercenaries, the German askaris were subsequently recruited from the Wahehe and Angoni tribal groups. They were harshly disciplined but well paid and highly trained by German cadres who were themselves subject to a rigorous selection process. Prior to 1914 the basic Schutztruppe unit in Southeast Africa was the Feldkompanie comprising seven or eight German officers and NCOs with between 150 and 200 askaris (usually 160)—including two machine gun teams.

Such small independent commands were often supplemented by tribal irregulars or Ruga-Ruga.

They were successfully used in German East Africa where 11,000 askaris, porters and their European officers, commanded by Paul Emil von Lettow-Vorbeck, managed to fight a successful guerilla campaign against numerically superior British, Portuguese and Belgian colonial forces until the end of World War I in 1918.

The Weimar Republic and pre-war Nazi Germany provided pension payments to the German askaris. Due to interruptions during the worldwide depression and World War II, the parliament of the Federal Republic of Germany (West Germany) voted in 1964 to fund the back pay of the askaris still alive. The West German embassy at Dar es Salaam identified approximately 350 ex-askaris and set up a temporary cashier's office at Mwanza on Lake Victoria.

Only a few claimants could produce the certificates given to them in 1918; others provided pieces of their old uniforms as proof of service. The banker who had brought the money came up with an idea: each claimant was handed a broom and ordered in German to perform the manual of arms. Not one of them failed the test.

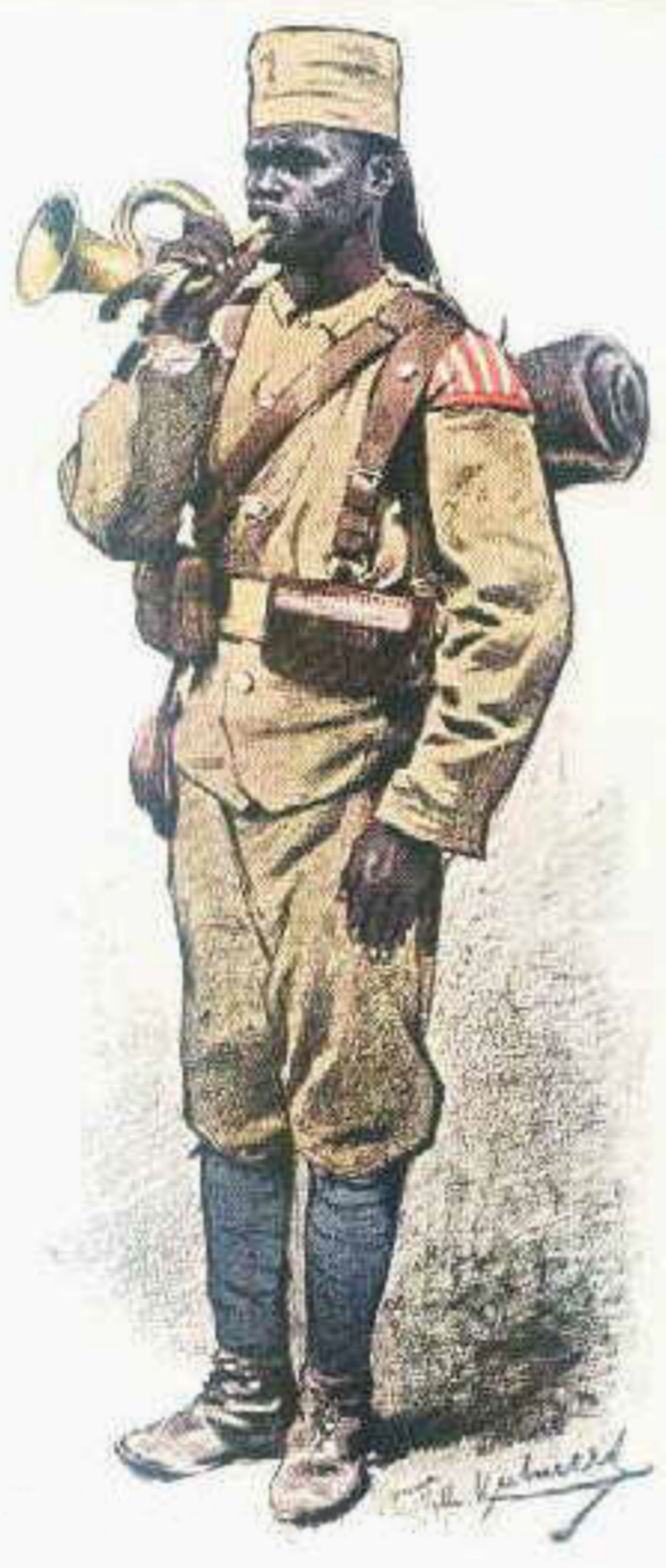
Askari bugler German East Africa

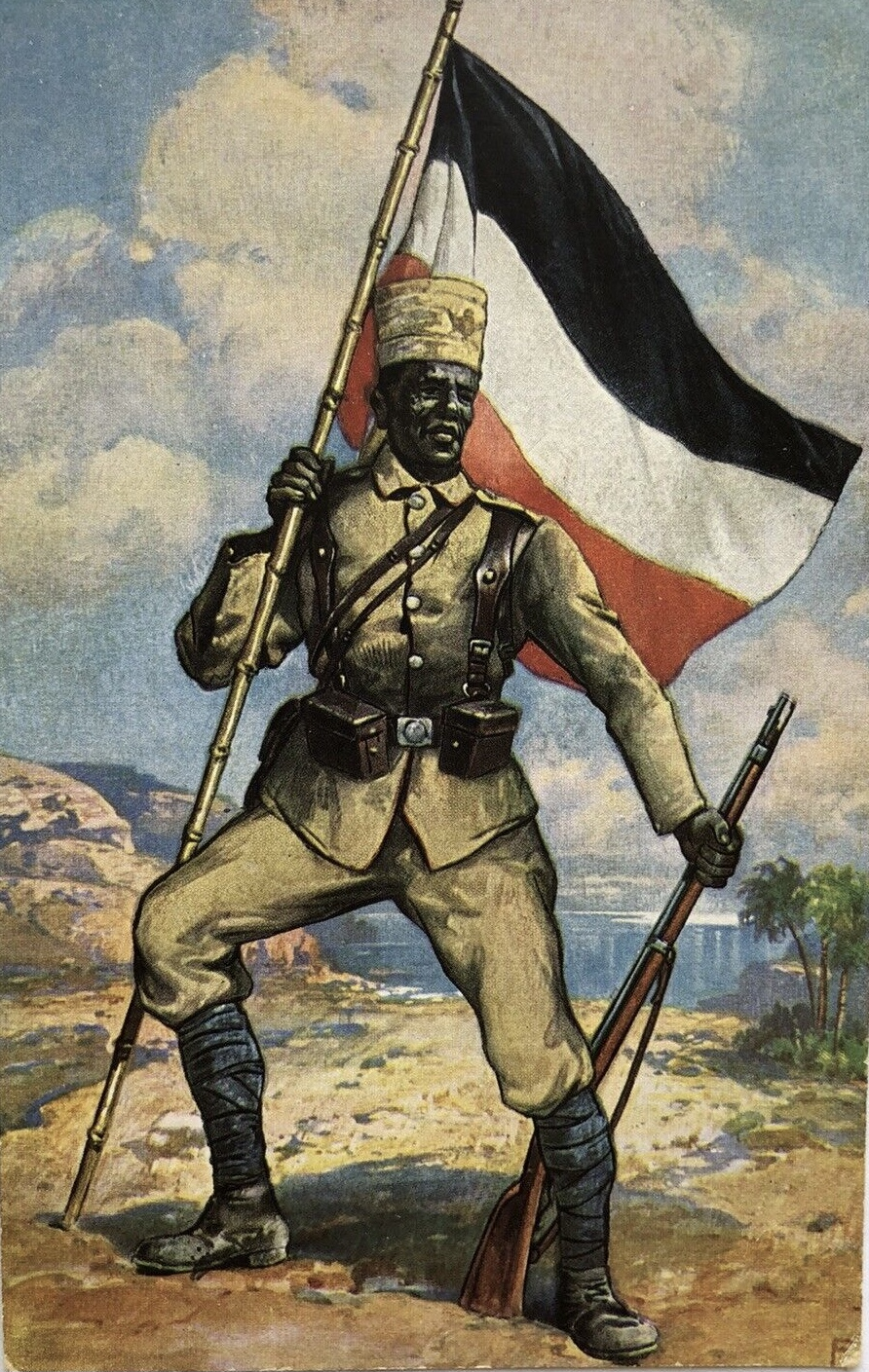
Askari in German army uniform, 1915

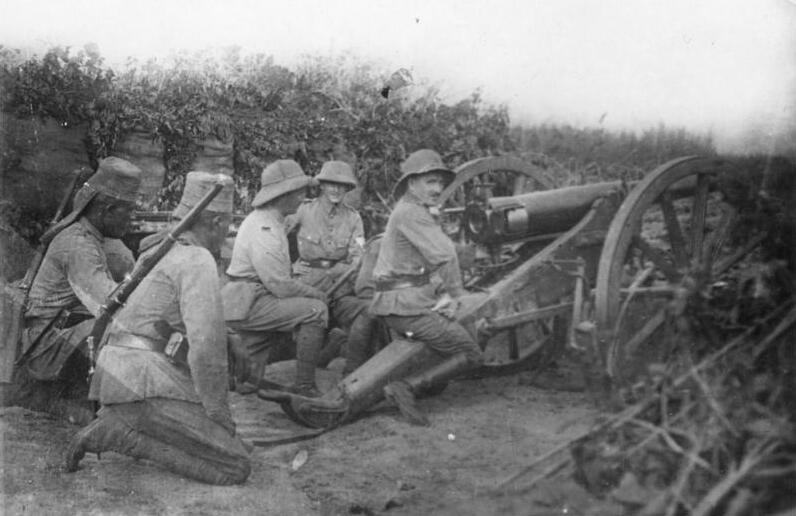
Germans and Askaris during the East African Campaign

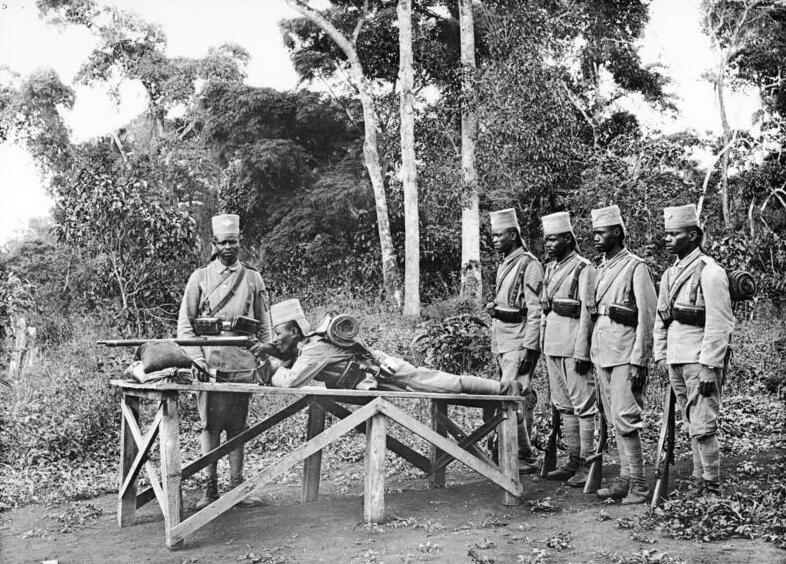
Askaris in training

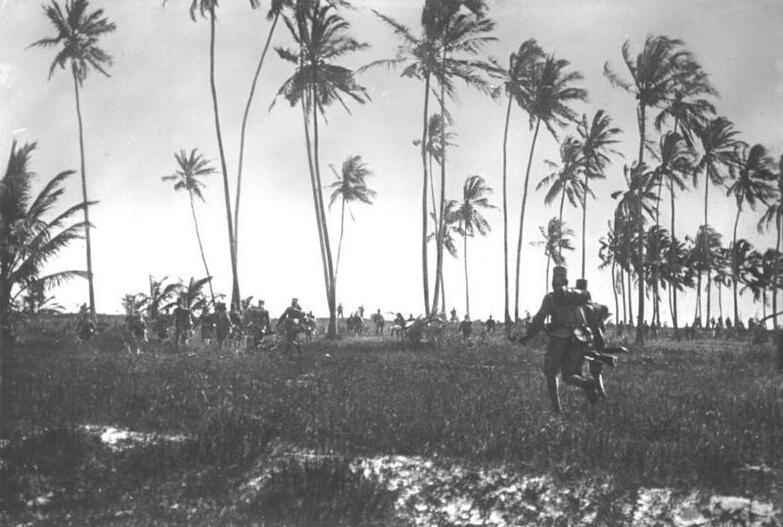
Askari in action (Tanga)

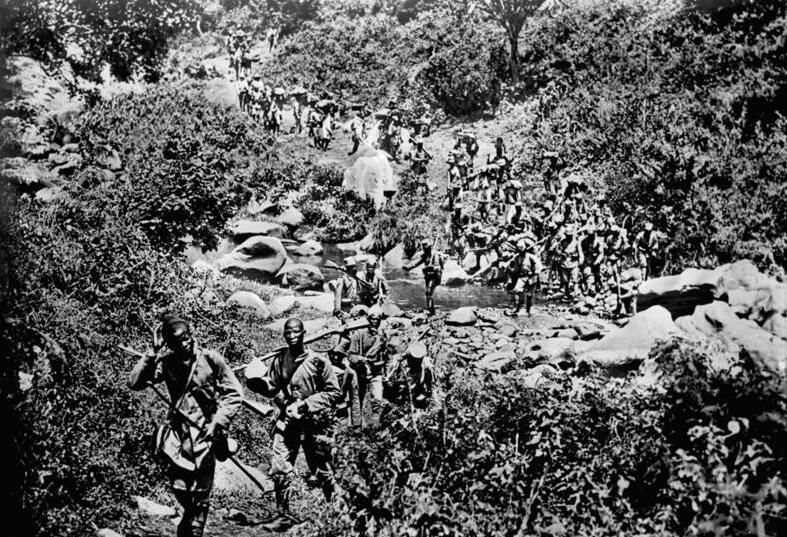
Askaris on the march (WWI)

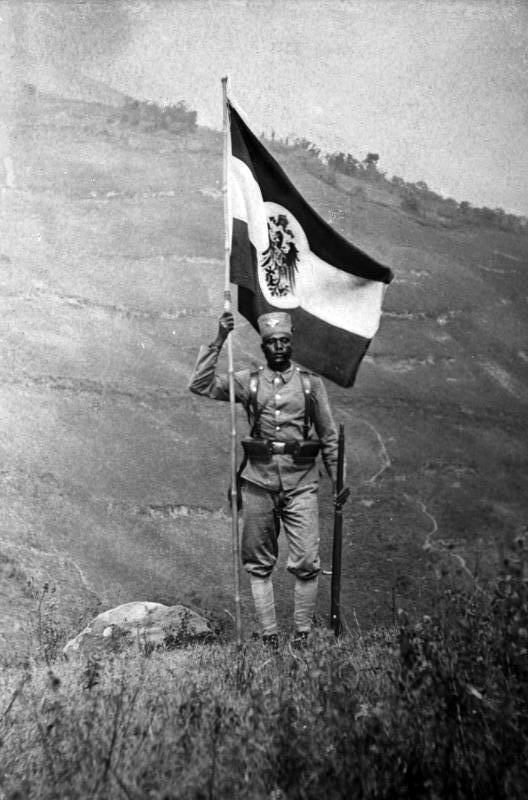
Askari standard bearer, German East Africa

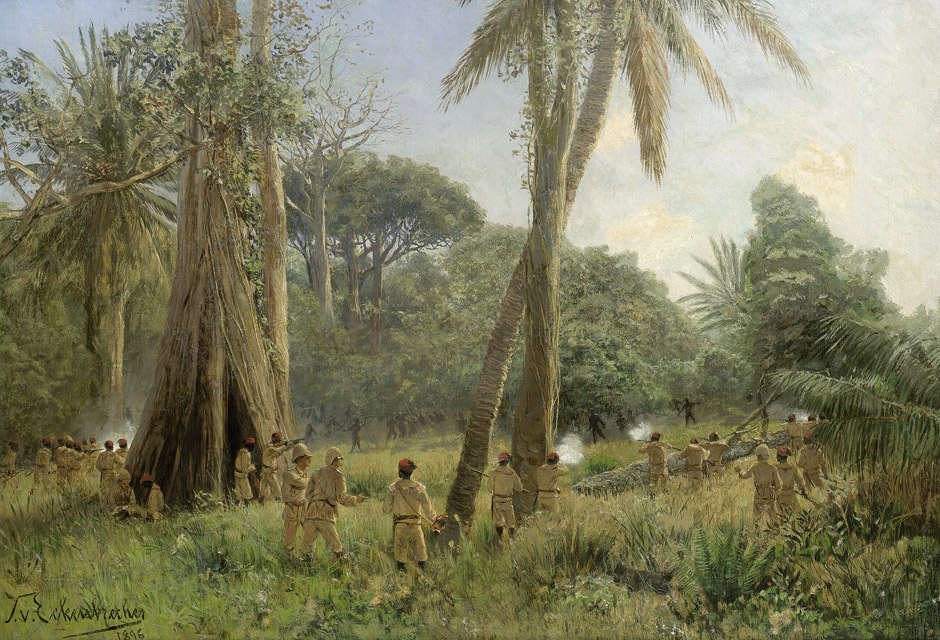
A depiction of a battle between local tribesmen and German askaris by Themistokles von Eckenbrecher, 1896.

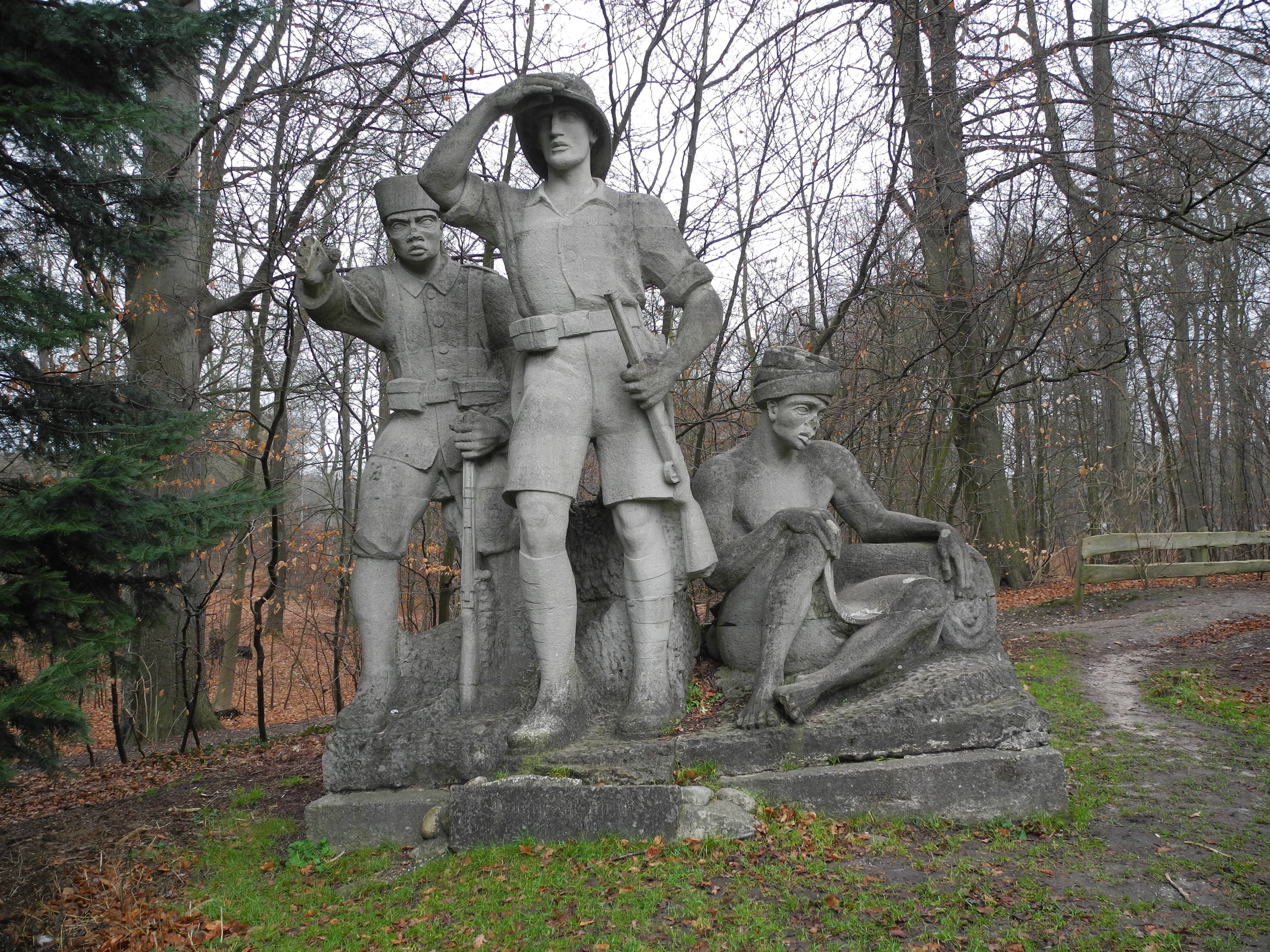
German-Ostafrika Memorial in Aumühle

== Italian colonies ==
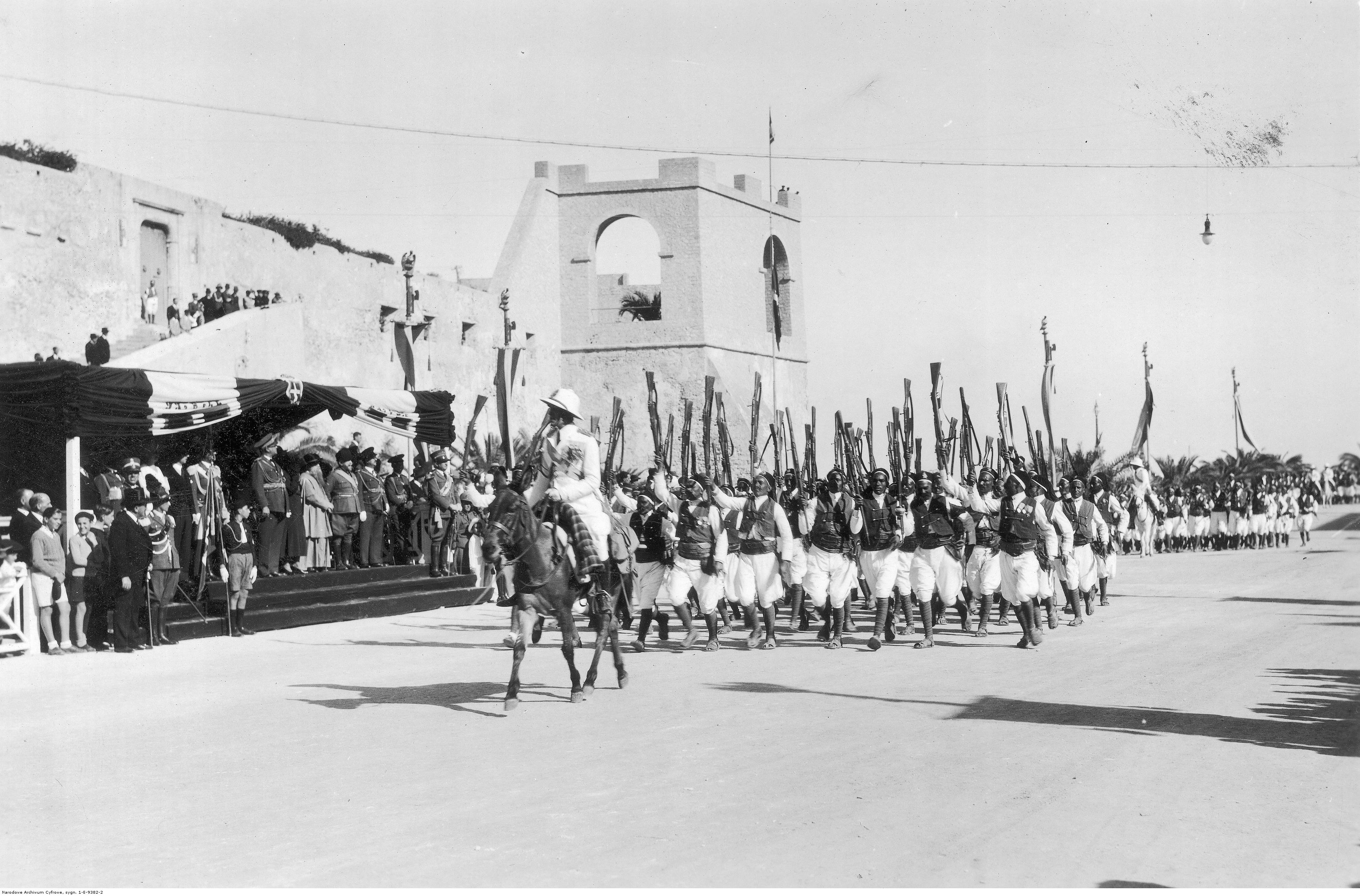
Parade of Italian askaris in front of King Victor Emanuel III and Governor Rodolfo Graziani during the King's visit in Italian Cyrenaica in February 1932

The Italian Colonial Army recruited Eritrean and subsequently Somali, Libyan and Ethiopian troops to serve under Italian officers. The first Eritrean battalions, the I, II, III and IV, were raised in 1888 from Muslim and Christian volunteers, replacing an earlier Bashi-bazouk corps of irregulars. The four Indigeni battalions in existence by 1891 were incorporated into the Royal Corps of Colonial Troops that year. The original four were expanded to eight battalions, adding V, VI, VII and VIII, in 1895/9. The Eritrean ascaris fought with distinction at Serobeti, Agordat, Kassala, Coatit and Adwa. Initially the Eritrean Ascaris comprised only infantry battalions, although Eritrean cavalry squadrons (Penne di Falco) and mountain artillery batteries were subsequently raised. By 1922 units of camel cavalry called "meharisti" had been added. Those Eritrean camel units were also deployed in Libya after 1932. During the 1930s Benito Mussolini added some armored cars units to the Ascari. Italian officers believed that askaris were expendable fighters. As a result, the askari usually saw more action and suffered greater casualties than their Italian counterparts.

Until 1935, voluntary military service attracted large amounts of recruits because of the pay and the prospect of post-retirement employment in the colonial administration. Regulations barred colonial subjects from rising above the rank of sergeant and all commissioned officers of the Ascari were Italian. To be enrolled, it was necessary to pass a marching test of about 60 km. Their discipline was very strict under their Italian officers, who always carried a "curbasc", a whip made of hippopotamus skin used for corporal punishment. In early 1934, Italy started assembling an army to invade Ethiopia. To support this effort, the colonial administration introduced conscription. By the time of the Italian invasion of Ethiopia in October 1935, there were 60,000 Askaris in the Italian colonial army. Most of them served in the 1st, 2nd, or 3rd colonial divisions, but some belonged to other units and the irregular militias called banda.

== Spanish colonies ==
As noted above "askari" was normally a designation used in Sub-Saharan Africa. Exceptionally though, the term "askari" was also used by the Spanish colonial government in North-West Africa, in respect not of their regular Moroccan troops (see regulares), but of a locally recruited gendarmerie force raised in Spanish Morocco in 1913. They were known as the "Mehal-la Jalifianas". This was the equivalent of the better known Goumiers employed in French Morocco.

Indigenous members of the Tropas Nómadas or desert police serving in the Spanish Sahara were also designated as "askaris", as were the other ranks of the Native Police (Policia Indígena) raised in Melilla in 1909.

== Portuguese colonies ==
In Portuguese West Africa, and most other African colonies of the Portuguese Empire, local askaris were recruited. These were used to keep the peace in the nation-sized colonies. During the 20th century, all the indigenous troops were merged into a Portuguese colonial army. This military was segregated along lines of race, and until 1960 there were three classes of soldiers: commissioned soldiers (European whites), overseas soldiers (black African "civilizados") and native soldiers (Africans who lived in the Portuguese colonies). These categories were renamed to 1st, 2nd and 3rd class in 1960—which effectively corresponded to the same classification.

== Apartheid South Africa ==
During Apartheid, especially during the 1980s, Askari was the term used to describe former members of the liberation movements who came to work for the Security Branch, providing information and identifying and tracing former comrades. A number were also operationally deployed. Former members of the liberation movements became askaris if they defected from the liberation movements of their own accord or if they were arrested or captured. In some cases, attempts were made to "turn" captured uMkhonto we Sizwe (MK) or Azanian People's Liberation Army (APLA) operatives using both orthodox and unorthodox methods during interrogation, often involving torture. Other askaris were MK operatives who had been abducted by the Security Branch from neighbouring states. Several abductees remain disappeared and are believed to have been killed. The threats of death used to turn askaris were not idle. During the Truth and Reconciliation Commission hearings, amnesty applications revealed that several operatives were killed for steadfastly refusing to cooperate.

Askaris were primarily used to infiltrate groups and to identify former comrades with whom they had trained in other countries. At the Pretoria hearing in July 1999, Chris Mosiane testified: "In the initial stages, askaris were used as police dogs to sniff out insurgents with white SB [Security Branch members] as their handlers. Black SB were used to monitor the askaris." Askaris were initially treated as informers and were paid from a secret fund. Later, they were integrated into the South African Police at the level of constable and were paid an SAP salary. While deployed in the regions, they were paid an additional amount, which was usually generated by making false claims to a secret fund. After successful operations, they usually received bonuses. The askaris used Vlakplaas as an operational base and resided in the townships where they attempted to maintain their cover as underground MK operatives. Although a few askaris escaped, most were far too frightened to attempt it. At his amnesty hearing, Colonel Eugene de Kock testified that he had set up a spy network amongst the askaris and used electronic surveillance. He told the Amnesty Committee that he had also established a disciplinary structure to deal with internal issues and other infractions by askaris and white officers. However, askaris who exceeded their authority in operational situations or criminal matters were seldom punished. Generally, askaris were extremely effective. Because of their internal experience of MK structures, they were invaluable in identifying potential suspects, in infiltrating networks, in interrogations and in giving evidence for the state in trials.

== Post 2003 Iraq War ==
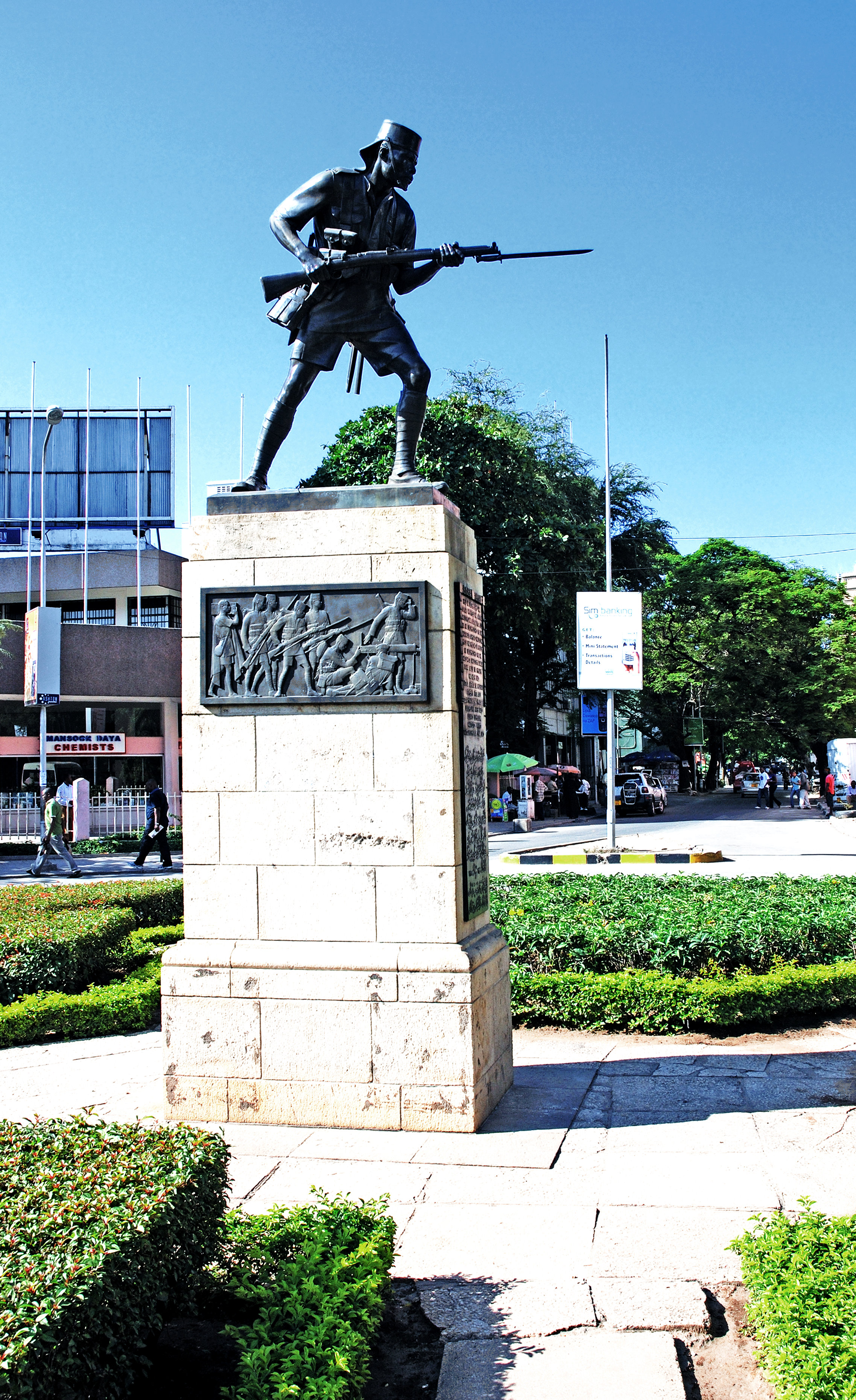
Askari Monument in Dar es Salaam, Tanzania dedicated to Askari who fought in the East African Campaign of World War I

Widely deployed Ugandan private security guards are also designated as askari. Guards were to receive $1,000 monthly salary and an $80,000 bonus if shot, but many have complained that the money was not paid or unfair fees assessed. The guards work for recruiting agencies such as Askar Security Services, which are hired by Beowulf International, a receiving company in Iraq, which subcontracts their services to EOD Technologies, an American company hired by the U.S. Department of Defense to provide security guards for Camp Victory in Baghdad. A Beowulf representative said that 400 of the workers "had impressed the US Army with their skill and experience", but complained that some of the workers lacked police or security experience and "didn't even know how to hold a gun". At least eleven other Ugandan recruiters include Dresak International and Connect Financial Services.

== See also ==
- Ascari, an Italian Soldati-class destroyer during World War II
- Belanda Hitam (Zwarte Hollanders), African recruits in the Royal Netherlands East Indies Army
- Colonial troops
- Force Publique (Belgian Congo)
- Lascar
- Sepoy
- Tiradores de Ifni and Regulares (Spanish North Africa)
- Tirailleurs (French Africa)
- USS Askari
