= Battle of Nambanje =

- Part of East African Campaign
Date	13 March 1917
Location	Nambanje, German East Africa 8°42′33″S 38°36′00″E
Result	German victory

Belligerents
German Empire: German East Africa	British Empire

Commanders and leaders
(German Empire) Paul von Lettow-Vorbeck	(United Kingdom of Great Britain and Ireland) T.J.W. Weld

Units involved
Schutztruppe	(United Kingdom of Great Britain and Ireland) 1st East African Division

Strength
Unknown	Unknown

Casualties and losses
Unknown	7 killed 10 wounded 1 captured 1 machine gun captured
- Location within Tanzania Battle of Nambanje (Africa)

The Battle of Nambanje was a minor engagement between British and German colonial forces during the East African Campaign of World War I. It involved the 1st East African Division and took place on 13 March 1917. Several British units were ordered to attack German forces that had been spotted near Nambanje. The British advance was detected by the Germans the day before, which enabled them to prepare and repulse the attack.
