= Paul von Lettow-Vorbeck =

German army officer (1870–1964)

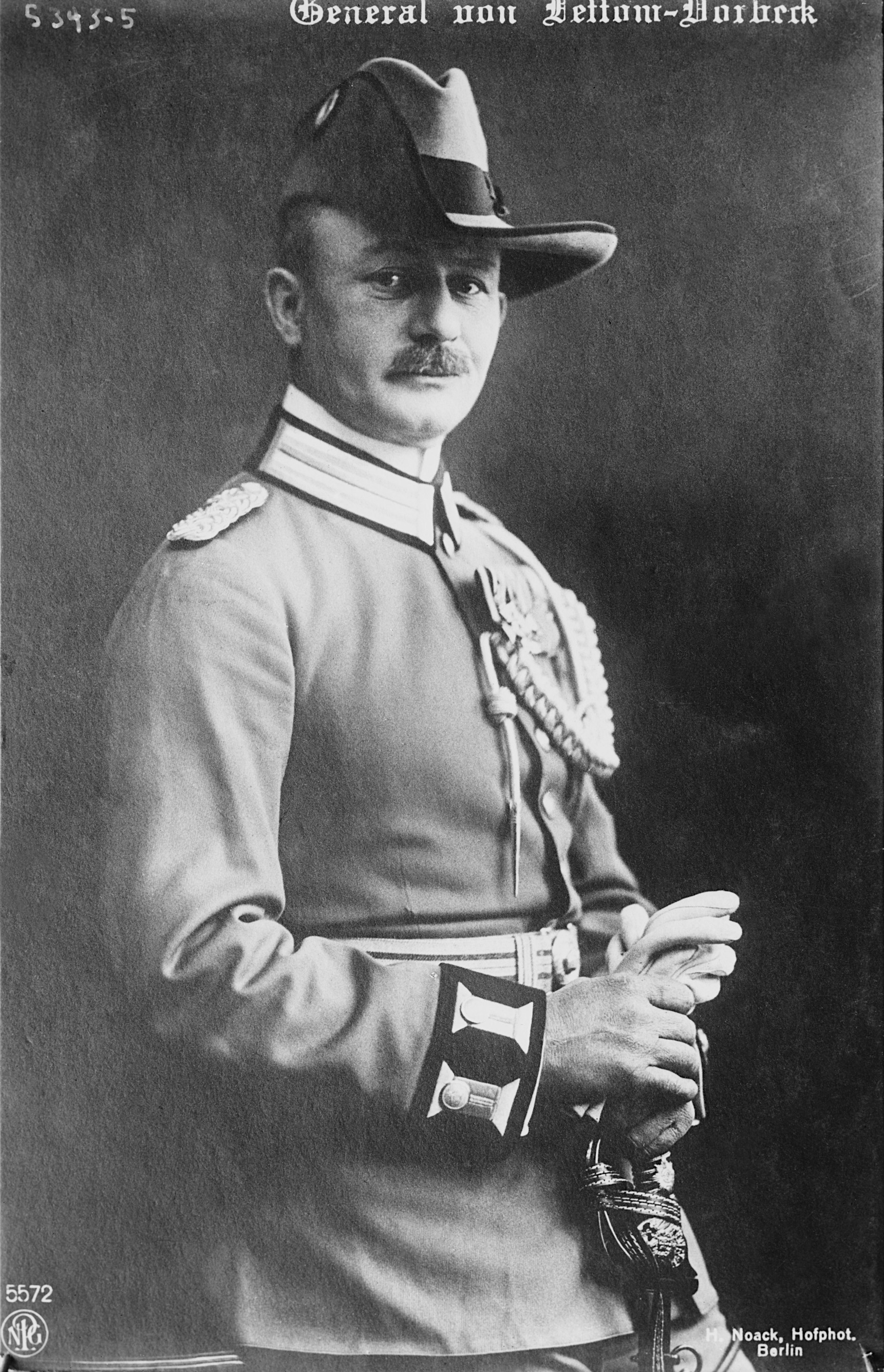
- Lettow-Vorbeck in 1914
- Born: 20 March 1870; Saarlouis, Rhine Province, Kingdom of Prussia
- Died: 9 March 1964 (aged 93); Hamburg, West Germany
- Military career
- Allegiance: German Empire (1890–1918); Weimar Republic (1918–1920)
- Branch: Imperial German Army: Prussian Army; Reichsheer
- Service years: 1890–1920
- Rank: Generalmajor; General der Infanterie (Charakter)
- Nicknames: Der Löwe von Afrika; The Lion of Africa
- Units: 4th Foot Guards; Schutztruppe of German; South-West Africa; XI Corps
- Commands: 2nd Sea Battalion; Schutztruppe of German; East Africa
- Conflicts: Boxer Rebellion; Herero Wars; Battle of Waterberg; World War I; East African Campaign; Battle of Tanga; Battle of Jassin; Battle of Mahiwa; Battle of Ngomano; Battle of Lioma; Battle of Kisaki; Battle of Nambanje; Battle of Kondoa Irangi; Battle of Mlali; Battle of Namacurra; Battle of Dutumi; Battle of Kibata; Battle of Kilosa; German Revolution
- Awards: Pour le Mérite with Oak Leaves
- Other work: Public speaker, writer

Paul Emil von Lettow-Vorbeck (popularly known as the Lion of Africa (German: Löwe von Afrika; 20 March 1870 – 9 March 1964), was a general in the Imperial German Army and the commander of its forces in the German East Africa campaign. For four years, with a force of about 14,000 (3,000 Germans and 11,000 Africans), he held in check a much larger force of 300,000 British, Indian, Belgian, and Portuguese troops. He is known for never being captured in battle, and for keeping his forces intact throughout the war.

Lettow-Vorbeck was the only German commander to successfully invade a part of the British Empire during the First World War. His exploits in the campaign have been described by historian Edwin Palmer Hoyt as "the greatest single guerrilla operation in history, and the most successful".

== Early life ==
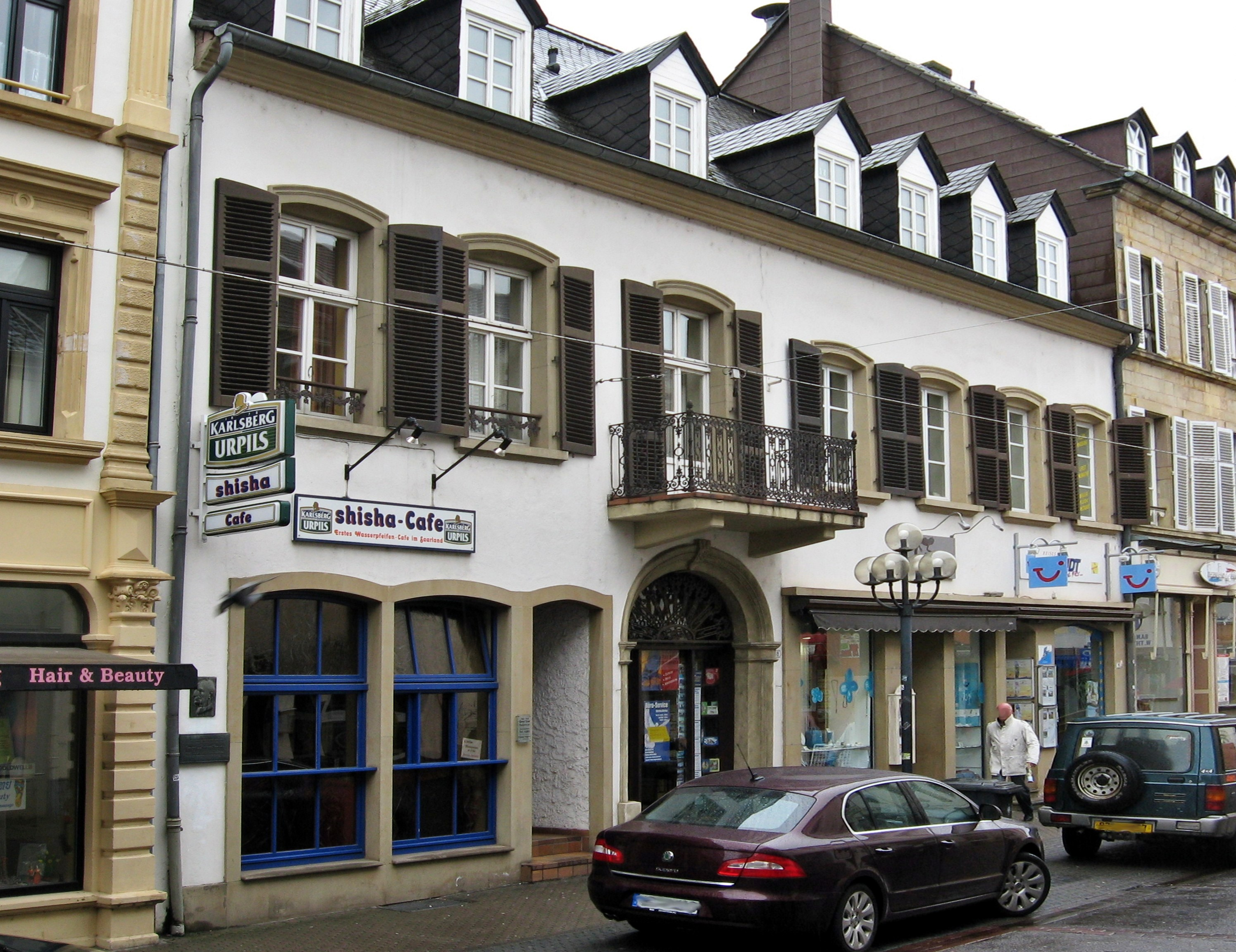
Lettow-Vorbeck's birthplace in Saarlouis

Paul Emil von Lettow-Vorbeck was son of Paul von Lettow-Vorbeck (1832–1919) and Marie von Eisenhart-Rothe (1842–1919). He was born into the Pomeranian minor nobility, while his father was stationed as an army officer at Saarlouis in the Prussian Rhine Province. He was educated in boarding schools in Berlin and joined the cadet corps at Potsdam and Berlin-Lichterfelde. In 1890, he was commissioned a Leutnant into the Imperial German Army.

According to Robert Gaudi, "In Mein Leben von Lettow writes nostalgically of his decade as a junior officer in the Kaiser's Imperial Army: there were Dawn inspections in the biting cold, regimental maneuvers, glimpses of the luminaries of the day – the Kaiser, Crown Prince Friedrich, the "Man of Gold" Field Marshal Count von Moltke, who was Germany's greatest military strategist, and others. There were drinking parties with fellow officers, card games till all hours, and splendid dances in Berlin – the young women shivering in their off-the-shoulder dresses, the new officers in bright stiff uniforms - followed by the mad rush to catch the last train back to Spandau barracks before the last roll call."

Lettow-Vorbeck later wrote, "I recall an older officer scolding a younger one because he failed to ask a young woman who was without a partner to dance. Offenses against chivalry were not tolerated."

Lt. von Lettow-Vorbeck was assigned to the Great German General Staff.

== Military career ==
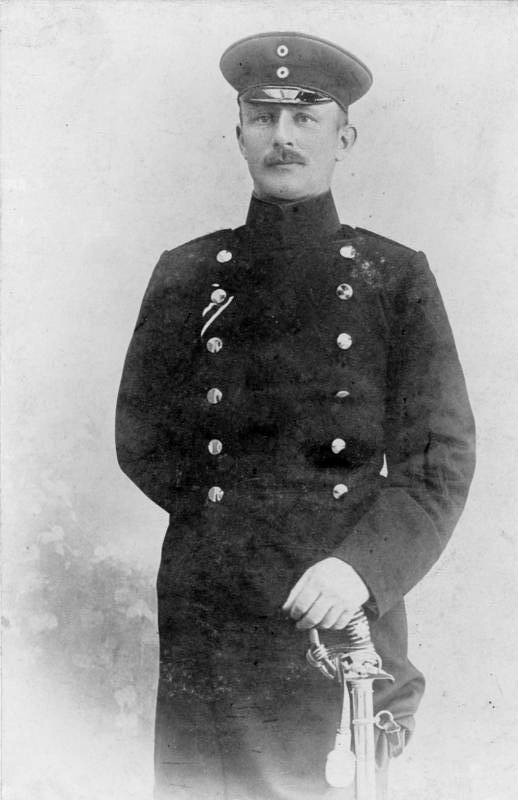
Captain von Lettow-Vorbeck, stationed in German South-West Africa in 1904

In 1900, Lettow-Vorbeck was posted to China as a member of the international alliance forces to quell the Boxer Rebellion. Although Lettow-Vorbeck was fascinated by the ancient history and elaborate courtesy of Chinese culture, he intensely disliked fighting against guerrillas and considered the war detrimental to the discipline of the German Army. He returned to the German General Staff from China in 1901.

Beginning in 1904, Lettow-Vorbeck, now a captain, was assigned to German Southwest Africa (now Namibia), during the Herero insurrection and the subsequent genocide.

Lettow-Vorbeck saw combat against the Herero at the Battle of Waterberg, which he later called, "something rarely encountered in guerrilla warfare, a chance to defeat them in a single operation."

When the Nama people also rose against German rule under the leadership of Hendrik Witbooi, Lettow-Vorbeck remained in German Southwest Africa in order to continue fighting. He played a major role in the pursuit of Jacob Morenga. During a 1906 gunfight against Morenga and his men, Lettow-Vorbeck suffered injuries to his left eye, which was left blind, and his chest.

He was then evacuated to South Africa for treatment and recovery.

Leonard Mosley would later write, however, "It was from these brilliant and fantastic Hottentots that Lettow-Vorbeck learned the Bushcraft that was to prove of such value to him in his war against the British in East Africa. When [Hottentot guerrilla leader] Samuel Isaak was captured and brought in for questioning, it was von Lettow who conducted the interrogations... His questions were how to live off a country which offers no apparent sustenance, how to run in conditions when most men barely have the strength to walk, how to condition the body to go without food or water, and most important of all, how to become so much a part, so absorbed into an unfriendly wilderness that survival is possible as the snakes and land crabs and lizards survive".

In 1907 Lettow-Vorbeck was promoted to Major and assigned to the staff of XI Corps at Kassel, Hesse. From March 1909 to January 1913, he was commanding officer of the marines of II. Seebataillon ("2nd Sea Battalion") at Wilhelmshaven, Lower Saxony. In October 1913, the Imperial German army promoted him to Lieutenant Colonel and appointed him to command the German colonial forces, known as the Schutztruppe (protectorate force), in German Kamerun (today's Cameroon, plus a portion of present-day Nigeria). Before he could assume this command, however, his orders were changed and he was posted — with effect from 13 April 1914 — to German East Africa (Tanganyika, the mainland territory of present-day Tanzania).

While travelling to his new assignment, Lettow-Vorbeck formed a lifelong friendship with Danish author Karen Blixen (also known by her pen name of Isak Dinesen), who was travelling aboard the same liner. Decades later, she recalled that, "He belonged to the olden days, and I have never met another German who has given me so strong an impression of what Imperial Germany was and stood for."

== First World War ==
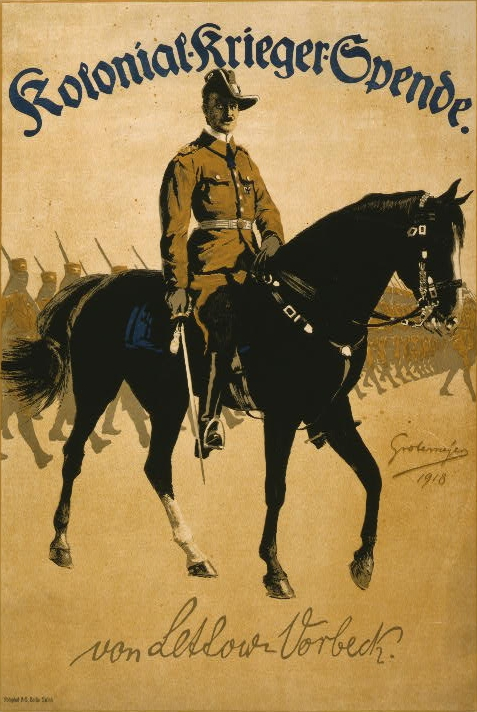
Great War poster of Lettow-Vorbeck leading African soldiers. Above: "Colonial Warriors' Donation"; below a facsimile of Lettow-Vorbeck's signature

Lettow-Vorbeck's plan for the war was relatively simple: knowing that East Africa would only be a sideshow to other theatres of war, he was determined to tie down as many British troops as he could. He intended to keep them away from the Western Front, and in this way to contribute to the German war effort.

In August 1914 Lettow-Vorbeck was the commander of a military garrison of 2,600 German nationals and 2,472 African soldiers in fourteen Askari field companies. Feeling the need to seize the initiative, he disregarded orders from Berlin and the colony's Governor, Heinrich Schnee, who had attempted to achieve neutrality for German East Africa, relying on the Congo Act of 1885, by which the European colonial powers had promised to keep their overseas possessions neutral in any European wars. He thus prepared to repel a major British amphibious assault on the city of Tanga. The attack began on 2 November 1914, and for the next four days the German forces fought the Battle of Tanga. Lettow-Vorbeck then assembled his men and their scant supplies to attack the British railways in East Africa. He scored a second victory over the British at Jassin on 19 January 1915. These victories allowed the Germans to capture much needed rifles and other supplies, in addition to boosting the troops' morale. Lettow-Vorbeck also lost many experienced men, however, including the "splendid Captain Tom von Prince", whom he could not easily replace.

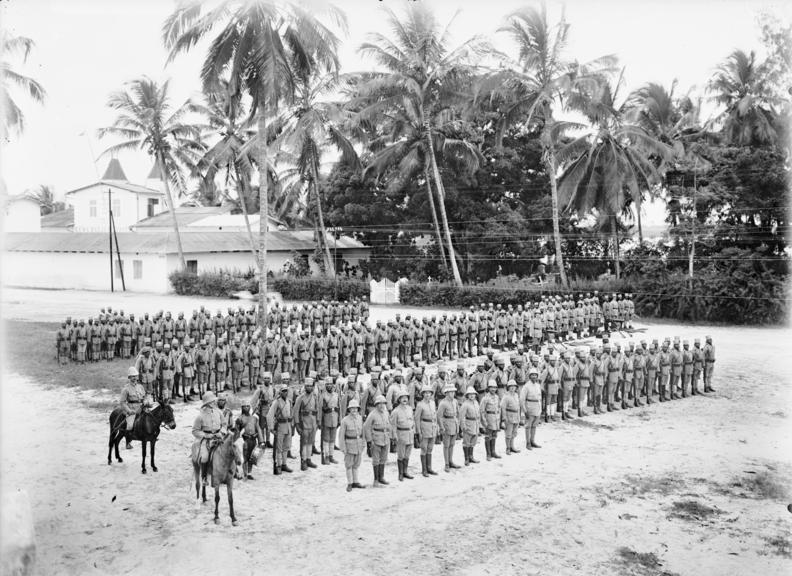
Schutztruppe Askari Company (1914)

Though casualties were high, Lettow insisted his commanders engage British forces, though they offered few enticing targets. This forced him to conduct raids into British East Africa (later Kenya, Uganda, and Zanzibar), targeting forts, railways, and communications, still hoping to force the Entente to divert manpower from the main theatre of war in Europe. Realizing the critical needs of guerrilla warfare, he used everything available to him to keep his troops supplied.

The Schutztruppe recruited new personnel and expanded its size to some 14,000 soldiers, most of them Askaris. Lettow-Vorbeck's fluency in the Swahili language apparently earned the respect and admiration of his African soldiers. He appointed black officers and reportedly stated that "we are all Africans here". In one historian's opinion,

"It is probable that no white commander of the era had so keen an appreciation of the African's worth not only as a fighting man but as a man."

The historian Michael von Herff says the loyalty of Askaris during the campaign was due to them having formed a military caste within the colonial structure, which had largely separated itself from its members' tribal roots.

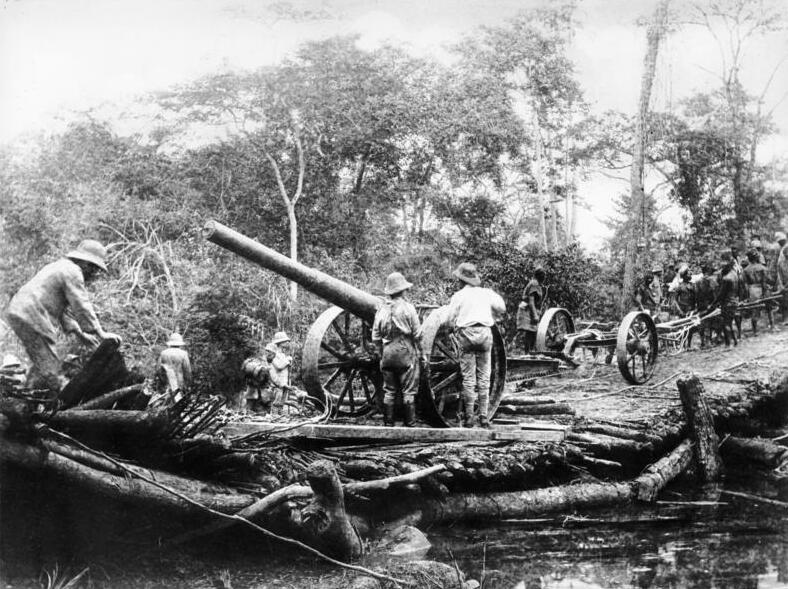
Königsberg guns on land

In 1915, he gained the men and artillery of the German cruiser SMS Königsberg which had been scuttled in the Rufiji River delta. The cruiser had a capable crew under commander Max Looff, and its artillery pieces, converted to land use, became the largest standard guns used in the East African Theatre. In March 1916 British forces under General Jan Smuts and the Belgians under Charles Tombeur launched an offensive with 45,000 men near Tabora. Lettow-Vorbeck used the climate and terrain to his advantage, engaging the British on his terms. British reinforcements forced Lettow-Vorbeck to yield territory. Continuing his resistance, Lettow-Vorbeck fought a crucial battle at Mahiwa in October 1917, where he inflicted 2,700 casualties on the British. Lettow-Vorbeck himself lost 519 men killed, wounded, or missing while also running critically low on ammunition, forcing him to withdraw. The British would proceed to recover their losses and continue to hold an overwhelming advantage in numbers of men. For the Schutztruppe, this was serious, for there were no reserves with which to replenish their ranks. After news of the battle reached Germany, however, Lettow-Vorbeck was promoted to major-general (Generalmajor).

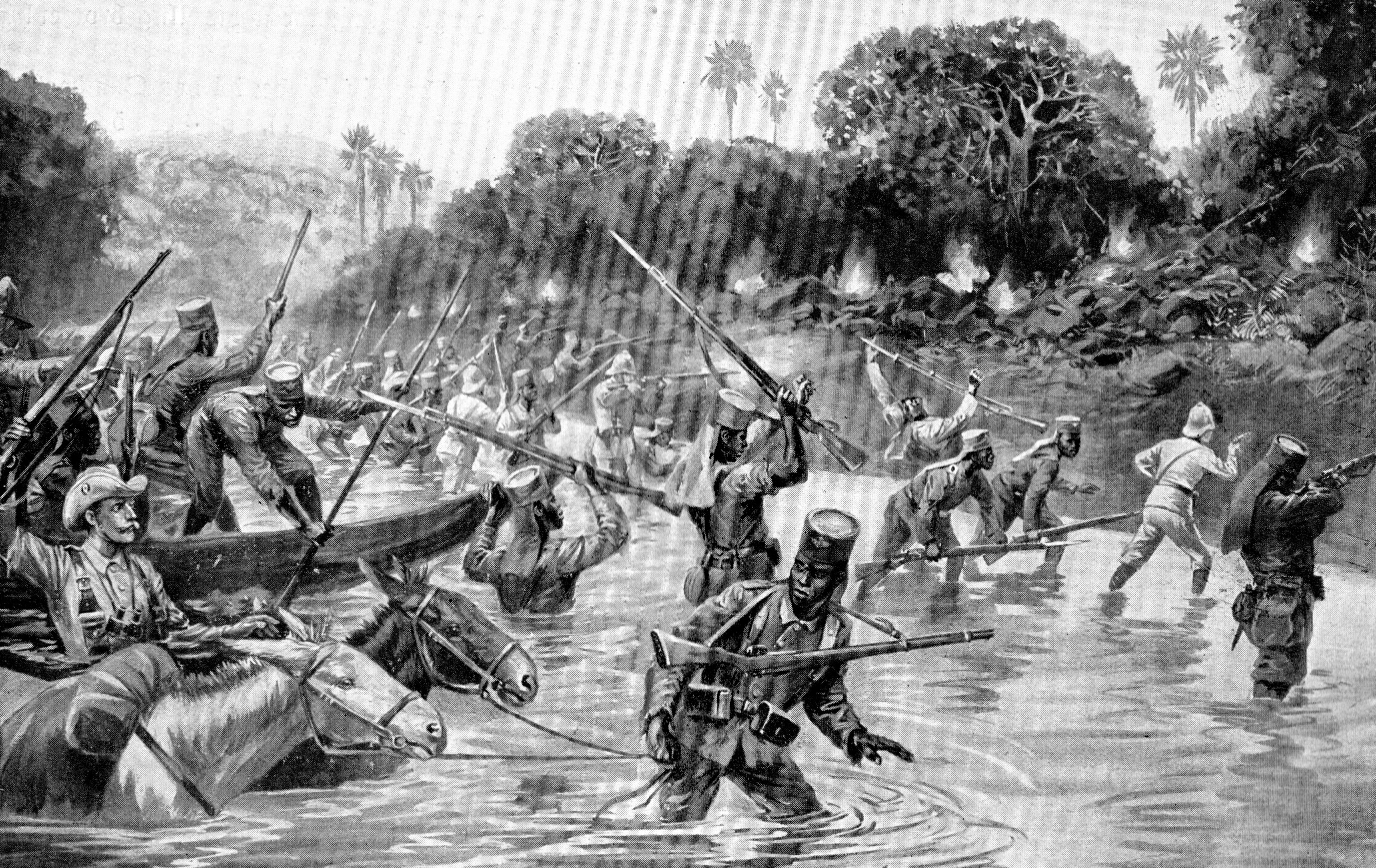
The Battle of Ngomano in November 1917

Lettow-Vorbeck thus withdrew to the south, with his troops on half rations and the British in pursuit. On 25 November 1917, his advance column waded across the Ruvuma River into Portuguese Mozambique. Having essentially cut their own supply lines, the Schutztruppe caravan became a completely independent unit. On its first day across the river, the column attacked the newly replenished Portuguese garrison of Ngomano and solved its supply problems for the foreseeable future. The subsequent capture of a river steamer with a load of medical supplies, including quinine, satisfied some of its medical needs as well. For almost a year Lettow-Vorbeck's men had lived off whatever was available, mainly provisions captured from the British and Portuguese; they had replaced their old rifles with new equipment and acquired machine guns and mortars after capturing Namakura (Namacurra in modern Mozambique) in July 1918.

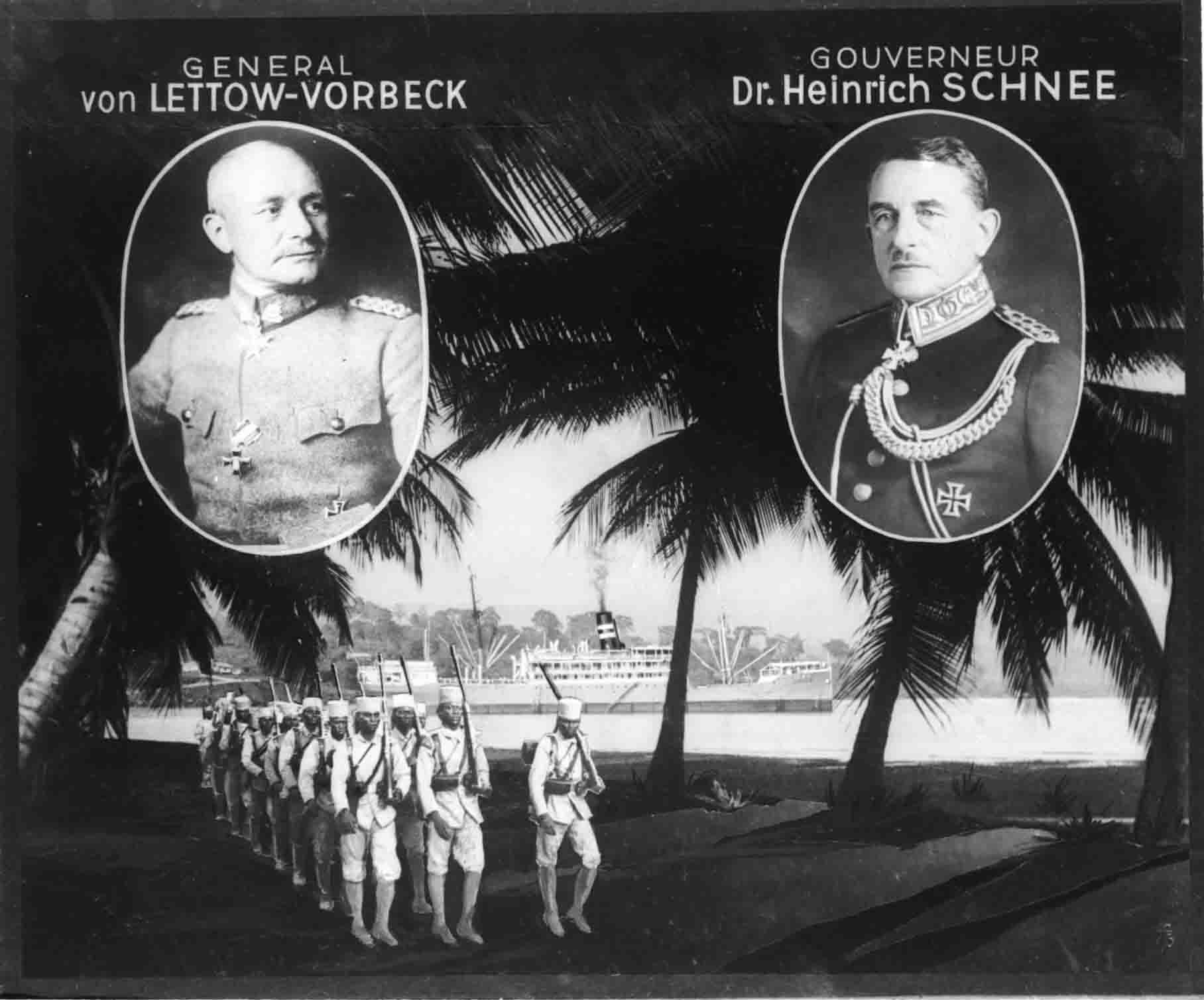
General von Lettow-Vorbeck and colonial Governor Heinrich Schnee

The war in East Africa set off a chain of events with devastating results for the natives and their German overlords. The invasions caused interruptions throughout the colony, so that the land no longer "basked in a climate of plenty."

Lettow-Vorbeck considered his first obligation as a military commander that to his army, over the objections of Governor Heinrich Schnee. The governor regarded war as the worst possible calamity to befall German East Africa, "[undoing] everything his social and economic reforms had accomplished." Lettow-Vorbeck's strategy, meanwhile, held central giving ground and escaping confrontations with Allied forces. He had thus established food depots along his intended line of march from Neu Moshi to the Uluguru Mountains, writing off famine in neighboring villages as a misfortune of war.

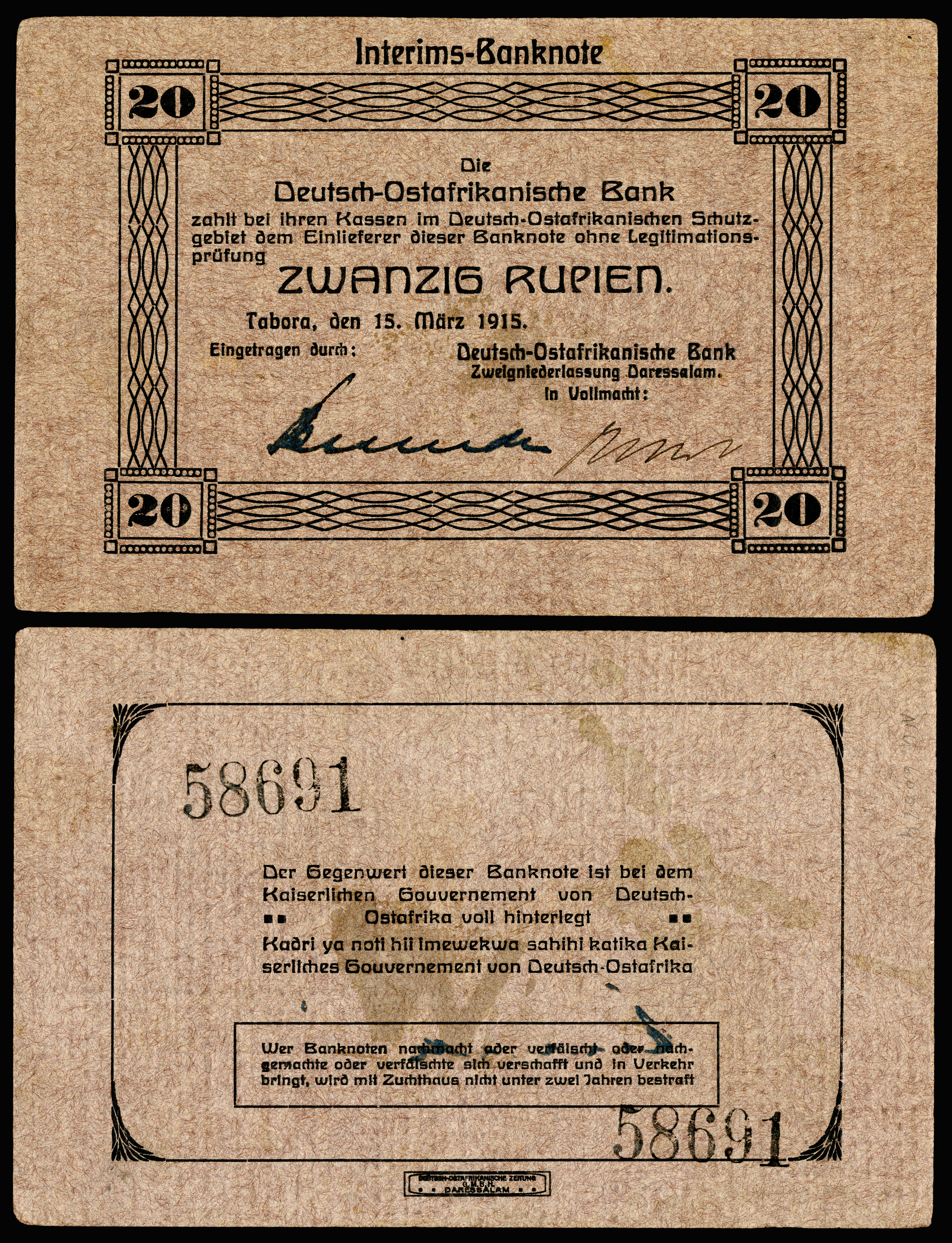
A 20 German East African rupie provisional banknote issued in Dar es Salaam due to a significant lack of provisions resulting from naval blockade

Little aid from Germany could penetrate the British naval blockade to alleviate the enormous supply deficiencies facing Lettow-Vorbeck's men in the area, and only two ships succeeded in running the blockade and reaching the colony. On 14 April 1915, the freighter Kronborg arrived off Tanga at Manza Bay after a two-month journey from Wilhelmshaven, and was promptly attacked by the British cruiser HMS Hyacinth. Fortunately for the Germans, Kronborg was scuttled by her captain to avoid a coal fire after repeated hits were scored by the British cruiser, and the ship settled in shallow water. Nearly the entire cargo could then be salvaged. However, when the steamer Marie von Stettin arrived south of Lindi on 17 March 1916, its cargo of 1,500 tons was of only very modest help to Lettow-Vorbeck's forces.

An attempt in November 1917 to resupply German forces by Zeppelin airship, an operation codenamed "the China Show", failed. The Zeppelin, LZ 104 (L 59), intended also as a morale-booster to the beleaguered East African troops, was designed to be dismembered on arrival and all its parts cannibalised as spares for the troops - the canvas of its hull used for tents, for example. The airship reached the Sudan, in a single uninterrupted flight from Bulgaria, where it received a message from the German Admiralty that its planned landing area in East Africa was no longer in Lettow-Vorbeck's hands. Its captain decided to turn back. The British later claimed the about-turn was a result of a fake radio message sent in German by British intelligence in Cairo stating that Lettow-Vorbeck had surrendered, but this has never been proven.

By late September 1916, all of coastal German East Africa, including Dar es Salaam and the Central Railway, was under British control. The west of the colony was meanwhile occupied by Belgian forces. In December 1917, the German colony was officially declared an Allied protectorate.

Lettow-Vorbeck and his caravan of Europeans, Askaris, porters, women, and children marched on, deliberately bypassing the tribal homelands of the native soldiers in an effort to prevent desertions. They traversed difficult territory. "Swamps and jungles ... what a dismal prospect there is in front of me," stated the Allied commander in pursuit, General Jan Smuts, whose new approach was subsequently not to fight the Schutztruppe at all, but to go after their food supply. When the end of the campaign eventually came, Smuts was in London and General J. L. van Deventer commanded East Africa.

His actions were described as "a campaign of supreme ruthlessness where a small, well trained force extorted supplies from civilians to whom it felt no responsibility...it was the climax of Africa's exploitation". Lettow-Vorbeck's tactics led to a famine that killed thousands of Africans and weakened the population, leaving it vulnerable to the Spanish influenza epidemic in 1919.

In a book published in 1919, Ludwig Deppe, a doctor of medicine who campaigned with Lettow-Vorbeck and who had formerly headed the hospital at Tanga, lamented the tragedy that German forces had imposed on East Africa in their war with the Allies:

"Behind us we leave destroyed fields, ransacked magazines and, for the immediate future, starvation. We are no longer the agents of culture, our track is marked by death, plundered and evacuated villages, just like the progress of our own and enemy armies in the Thirty Years' War."

When the worldwide Spanish influenza epidemic swept into eastern Africa in 1918–1919, it struck down thousands of people. The weakened state of many native Africans, resulting from the war, made them especially susceptible. Lettow-Vorbeck was greatly respected by his white officers, non-commissioned officers and Askaris, and even Allied forces. In the field when rations had to be reduced and supplies dwindled,

"It was a measure of the Askaris' loyalty to their commander that they accepted the cuts and did not desert en masse. Some did desert, of course... But the German Askaris were by far the most loyal as well as the most effective, and it all went back to… Lettow-Vorbeck's brand of discipline, which bound him and his German officers as much as his black soldiers".

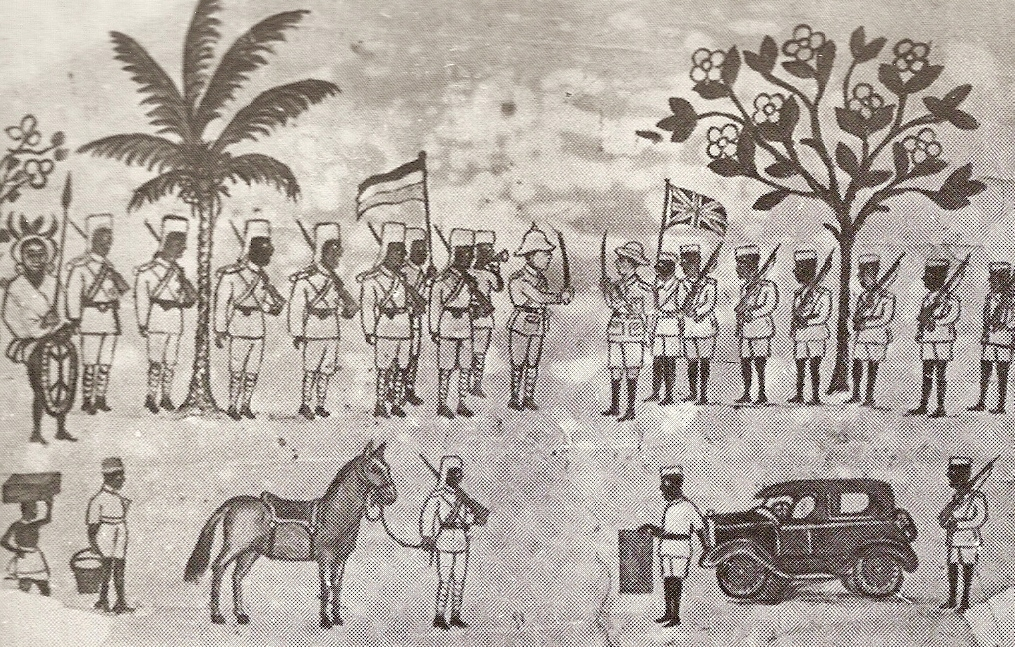
Lettow-Vorbeck surrendering his forces to the British at Abercorn, as drawn by an African artist

There is a legend that Lettow-Vorbeck once lost his glass eye in the bush. When an askari returned it to him and enquired why the colonel had removed it, Lettow-Vorbeck replied that "he had placed it there to watch that the askari were doing their duty".

On 28 September 1918, Lettow-Vorbeck again crossed the Ruvuma River and returned to German East Africa, with the British still in pursuit. He then turned west and raided Northern Rhodesia, evading an ambush that the British had prepared in German East Africa. On 13 November 1918, two days after the Armistice, he took the town of Kasama, which the British had evacuated, and he continued heading south-west towards Katanga. When he reached the Chambeshi River on the morning of 14 November, the British magistrate Hector Croad appeared under a white flag and delivered a message from South African General Jacob van Deventer, informing Lettow-Vorbeck of the Armistice. This message arrive carried by a runner the 400 miles from the end of the telegraph line at Kapiri Mposhi.

Lettow-Vorbeck refused to believe that, and required confirmation from Germany, but agreed to a temporary cease-fire at the spot now marked by the Chambeshi Monument in present-day Zambia. His message followed the same route to London, then to Germany, and the confirmation eventually reached him

Lettow-Vorbeck was instructed by the British to march north to Abercorn to surrender his army, arriving there on 25 November. The remains of his army at the time consisted of 30 German officers, 125 German non-commissioned officers and other enlisted ranks, 1,168 Askaris, and some 3,500 porters. Lettow-Vorbeck surrendered his sword, but as a mark of respect it was returned to him; similarly, his troops laid down their rifles, but were allowed to retain them.

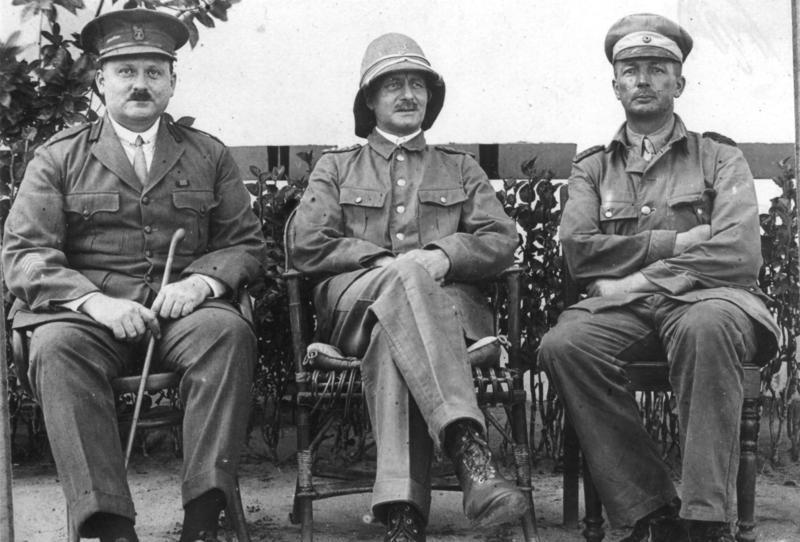
British officer with Lettow-Vorbeck and Georg Kraut in Dar es Salaam, March 1919

The British transferred the German POWs to Dar es Salaam for eventual repatriation. Lettow-Vorbeck made several efforts to secure an early release for his Askaris, who were in a POW camp at Tabora.

Before Lettow-Vorbeck was separated from his Askaris, one of them cried out,

"I have been asked to say this to you Bwana General. Where do you go now? Where you go, we will go with you! And if this is not the time, then wait until my son grows up to be a warrior and he will take my place and go with you. We will go with the Bwana General, will we not?"

Robert Gaudi writes,

"To a man, the Askaris stepped forward, ready to follow the commander to the ends of the Earth. But von Lettow held them back with a gesture and kept on marching. His war was over now."

== Weimar Republic ==
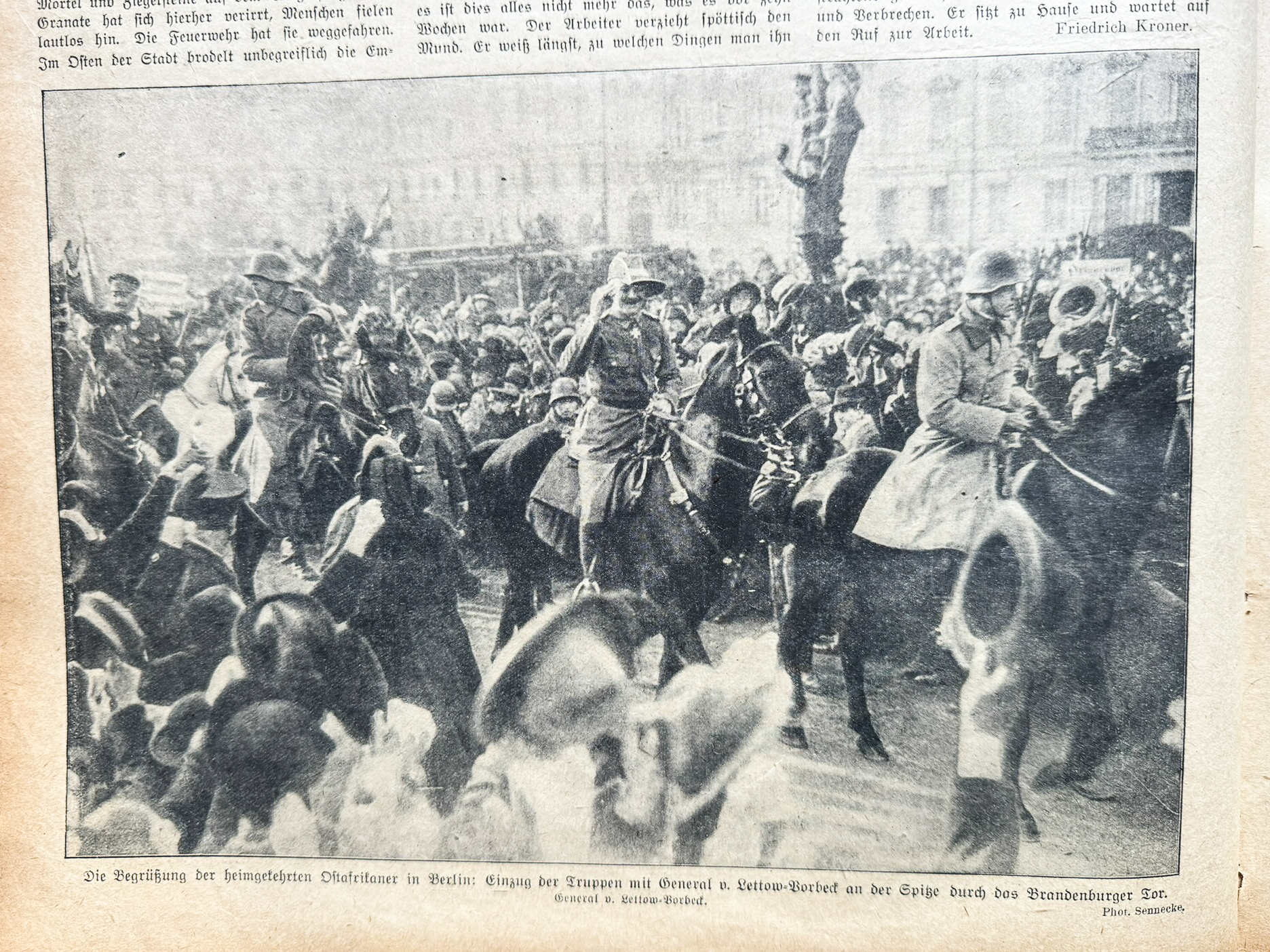
Triumphant return to Berlin of General Paul von Lettow-Vorbeck - the Lion of Africa 1919

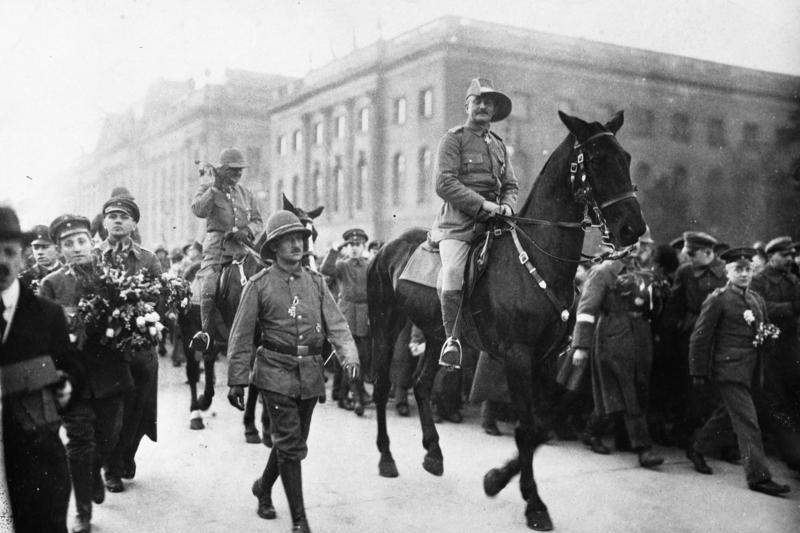
Lettow-Vorbeck at a parade in Berlin in 1919

Lettow-Vorbeck returned to Germany in early March 1919 to a hero's welcome. He led the veterans of the Schutztruppe in their tattered tropical uniforms on a victory parade through the Brandenburg Gate, which was decorated in their honour. He was the only German commander to successfully invade the British Empire during the First World War.

He remained in the Reichswehr despite attempts to involve him in the politics of the Weimar Republic. Fourteen months after his return to Germany, Lettow-Vorbeck commanded the troops that ended the Spartacist Uprising in Hamburg. However, Lettow-Vorbeck then lost his commission in the Reichswehr in the summer of 1920 following his involvement in the Kapp Putsch. He subsequently worked in Bremen as an import-export manager.

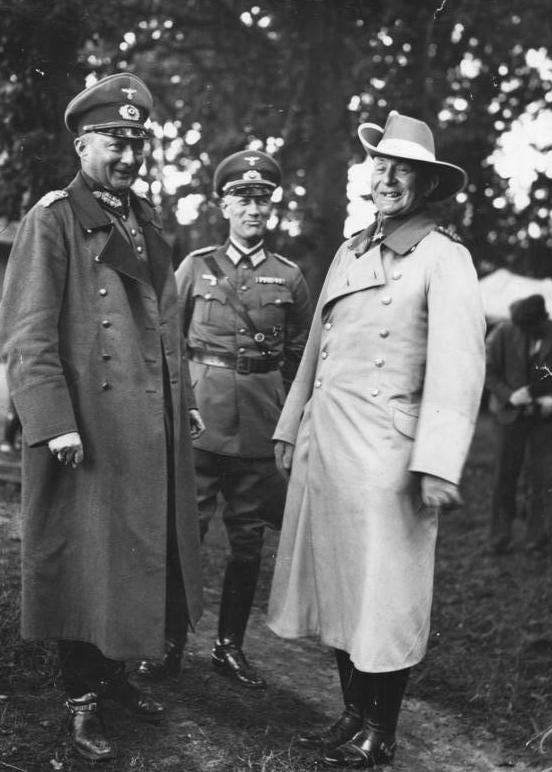
Lettow-Vorbeck (right) as a guest of General Günther von Kluge during army maneuvers in 1935

In June 1926, Lettow-Vorbeck met Richard Meinertzhagen in Bremen, the British Intelligence Corps Colonel with whom he had fought a battle of wits until December 1916, when Meinertzhagen was invalided. Three years later, Lettow-Vorbeck accepted an invitation to London where he met face-to-face for the first time Jan Smuts; the two men formed a lasting friendship. When Smuts died in 1950, Lettow-Vorbeck sent his widow a letter expressing his sympathy for her loss.

A similar oft-quoted claim states that Lettow-Vorbeck also apologised for the "ungentlemanly death" of the British hunter Frederick Selous at the hands of one of his snipers; this claim, however, is not supported by any contemporary evidence.

=== Political career ===
In a review of the work on Lettow-Vorbeck by Uwe Schulte-Varendorff, historian Eckard Michels agrees with Schulte-Varendorff that Lettow-Vorbeck did not directly show susceptibility to far right politics and anti-Semitism. Eckard Michels also writes, however, that Lettow-Vorbeck did not seek publicity out of opportunism or greed and only morphed into a public figure because of the society at the time's desire for a reminder of bygone times.

Between May 1928 and July 1930, Lettow-Vorbeck served as a Reichstag deputy for the monarchist German National People's Party. He left the party in 1930, after Alfred Hugenberg became the party leader and drew it increasingly into the far right. Lettow-Vorbeck then joined the Conservative People's Party and ran for it in the election of 1930, where he gained the best result of the party in his electoral district of Upper Bavaria, but was not re-elected. He intensely "distrusted Hitler and his movement," and approached his relative Hans-Jürgen von Blumenthal with an idea to form a coalition with Der Stahlhelm against the Nazis. This resulted in the Vorbeck-Blumenthal Pact.

== Nazi Germany ==
In 1933, Adolf Hitler courted Lettow-Vorbeck and unsuccessfully urged him to join the Nazi Party. He declined the offered position of head of the Reich Colonial Ministry. In April 1933, he unsuccessfully protested to Reich President Paul von Hindenburg against the Nazi dismissal of Bremen’s police colonel, Walter Caspari. Nevertheless, on 25 September 1933, he was appointed to the Bremen State Council, which advised the Senate on governmental matters, where he was responsible for colonial affairs.

Lettow-Vorbeck came into conflict with the Nazi regime in 1934 when he strongly opposed the incorporation of Der Stahlhelm, Bund der Frontsoldaten, into the reserve of the Sturmabteilung (aka Brownshirts/Stormtroopers, shortened as SA). Instead, he advocated the creation of a new veterans’ association. In Bremen, SA members attacked both members of the Stahlhelm and Lettow-Vorbeck’s office, prompting him to protest to Hindenburg, Ernst Röhm, and Hitler. His initiative was unsuccessful, however, and since he did not withdraw from the SA Reserve, he became a member of the SA in 1933.

When Hitler offered him the ambassadorship to the Court of St James's in 1935, he "declined with frigid hauteur"; the suggestion for the nomination as ambassador to the Court of St James had come from retired Colonel Richard Meinertzhagen during a visit to Berlin. During the 1960s, Charles Miller asked the nephew of a Schutztruppe officer, "I understand that von Lettow told Hitler to go fuck himself." The nephew responded, "That's right, except that I don't think he put it that politely."

During the Nazi era, he remained a central figure in the colonial veterans’ community and appeared at rallies and commemorative events, including the "German People’s Colonial Memorial Day" in Breslau in 1936 and the "East African Meeting" in Hamburg in 1938. His person and his conduct of the war in German East Africa were presented as exemplary models of German soldiery. On the occasion of his 50th service anniversary in 1938, he was celebrated as a "brilliant soldier," and on 25 Tannenberg Day, 27 August 1939, Hitler awarded him the honorary rank of General of the Infantry.

Lettow-Vorbeck’s propagandistic role within military colonial propaganda was viewed ambivalently by the National Socialist elite. While Field Marshal August von Mackensen suggested to Hitler that he be given greater prominence in propaganda, Propaganda Minister Joseph Goebbels wrote in his diary on 21 January 1938 regarding Lettow-Vorbeck: "Another reactionary! I’ll put a stop to that." On 2 February 1938, Goebbels added: "Lettow-Vorbeck is stirring up trouble against the state and the party. I’m having him banned from public speaking." For some National Socialists, he no longer appeared to embody the desired ideological conformity.

Lettow-Vorbeck repeatedly emphasized the loyalty of the Askari, while simultaneously developing a heroic conception of the German soldier. This "Askari myth" underscored the military and civilizational achievements of white Germans. The fact that, in his view, the Askari could also undergo Germanization brought him into conflict with Nazi racial doctrine, which denied Africans any adaptability or educability. After 1939, Lettow-Vorbeck became uninteresting to the Nazis.

== Post-war ==
By the end of World War II, Lettow-Vorbeck was destitute. His house in Bremen had been destroyed by Allied bombs, and he depended for a time on food packages from his friends Meinertzhagen and Smuts. After the postwar economic boom, however, he enjoyed comfortable circumstances again. In 1953 he visited Dar-es-Salaam, where he was welcomed by surviving Askaris who greeted him with their old marching song Heia Safari! British colonial officials welcomed him with full military honours.

His book, Africa, as I Saw It Again, published shortly thereafter, is a justification of colonial rule. While he conceded that "one day the natives should also govern themselves completely independently," this could only be a long-term goal: "Until then, European leadership is necessary; even the sensible Black people understand this."

As colonialism came to an end in Africa, several activists for the independence of Tanganyika, who were all the sons of Lettow-Vorbeck's Askaris, came to seek his advice. As there had been violence against the White population in the former colony of German East Africa, Lettow-Vorbeck later recalled that he gave one of them, who later became a government official in independent Tanzania,

"...a good talking to. I told him not to despise the White people and not to humiliate them for the mistakes they made. 'We only repudiate the small men, father,' he replied, 'When the White Man is big enough, as you were big enough, we continue to respect him.'"

Lettow-Vorbeck was pleased by this answer, and laughed and slapped his knee when he told Leonard Mosley about the conversation.

== Personal life ==
After his return from Africa, Lettow-Vorbeck married Martha Wallroth (1884–1953) in 1919. They had two sons and two daughters: Rüdiger (1921–1940), Arnd (1922–1941), Heloise (1923-2018), and Ursula (1927).

Both his two sons, Rüdiger and Arnd von Lettow-Vorbeck, and his stepson Peter Wallroth, were killed in action serving in the Wehrmacht.

== Death ==
In 1964, eleven days before his 94th birthday, Paul von Lettow-Vorbeck died in Hamburg. The West German government and the Bundeswehr flew in two former Askaris as state guests to attend the funeral.

Several officers of the Bundeswehr were assigned as an honour guard, and West Germany's Minister of Defence, Kai-Uwe von Hassel, gave the eulogy, saying that the deceased, "was truly undefeated in the field". Paul von Lettow-Vorbeck was buried in Pronstorf, Schleswig-Holstein, in the graveyard of Vicelin Church.

== Legacy ==
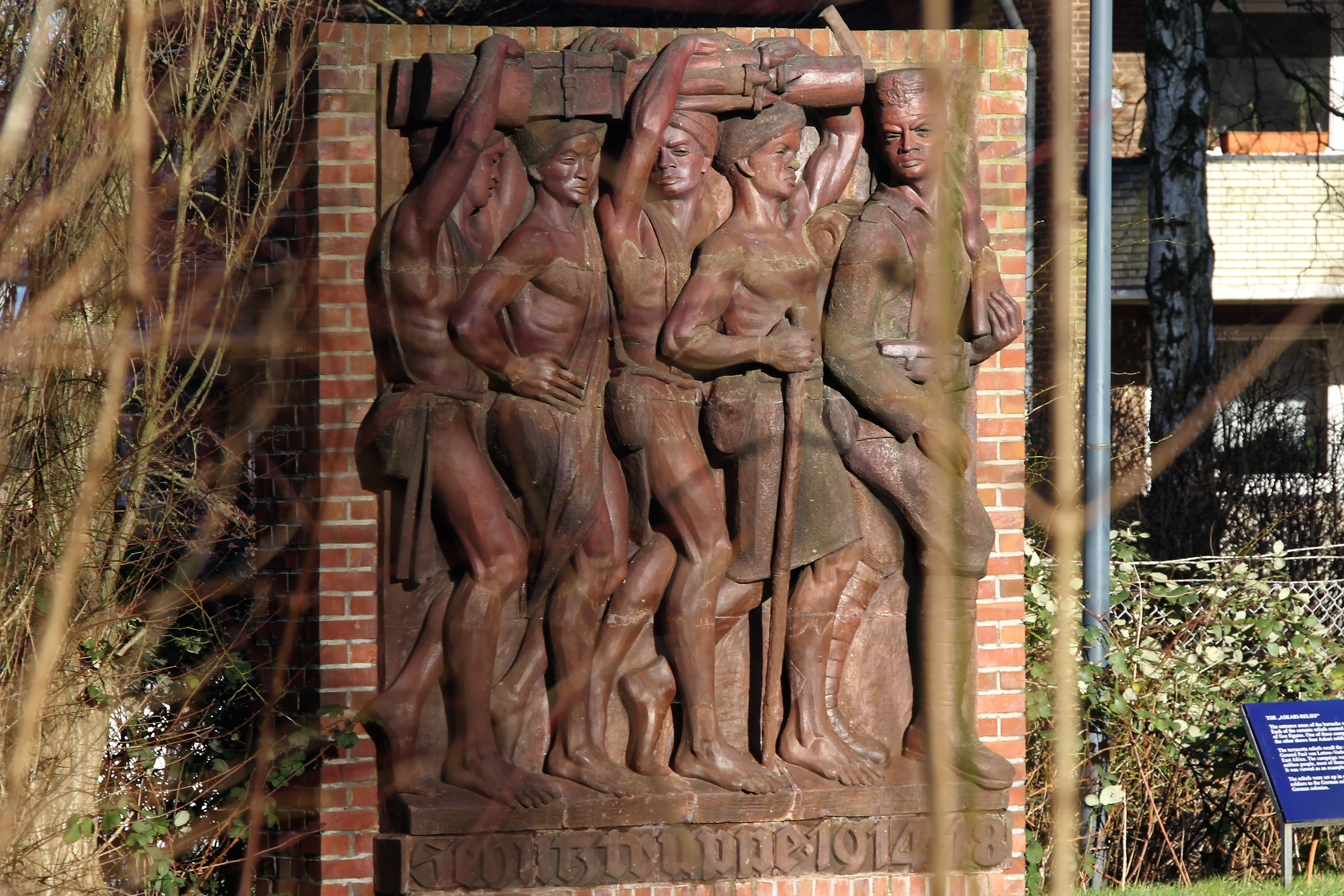
Relief sculpture at the former Hamburg-Jenfeld barracks

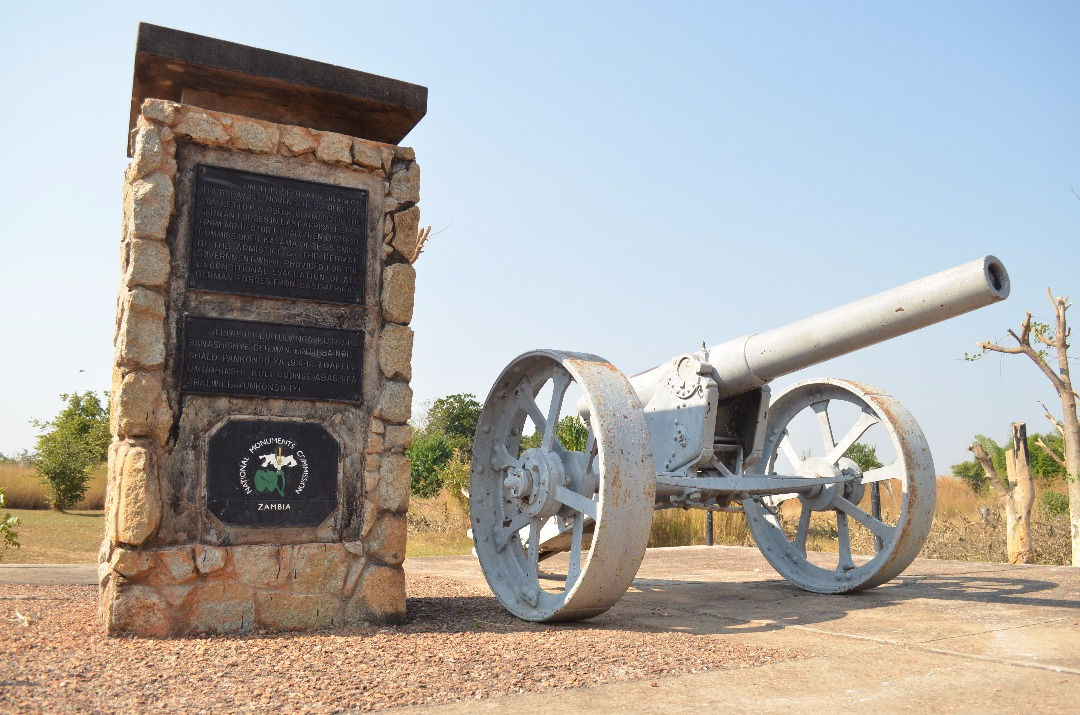
Chambeshi Monument, in the Northern Province of Zambia, also called the Chambeshi Memorial and the Lettow-Vorbeck Memorial, commemorates the final cessation of hostilities of the First World War, three days after the Armistice in Europe.

In the year of Lettow-Vorbeck's death, 1964, the West German Bundestag voted to give back-dated pay to all surviving Askaris from the German forces of the First World War. A temporary cashier's office was set up in Mwanza on Lake Victoria. Of the 350 former soldiers who gathered, only a handful could produce the certificates that Lettow-Vorbeck had given them in 1918. Others presented pieces of their old uniforms as proof of service. The German banker who had brought the money then had an idea. Each claimant was asked to step forward, was handed a broom, and was ordered in German to perform drills from their manual of arms. Not one man failed the test.

Four barracks of the Federal German Army, or Bundeswehr, were once named in Lettow-Vorbeck's honour. They were situated at Leer, Hamburg-Jenfeld, Bremen, and Bad Segeberg. Following the recent closure of 178 military installations, the only one remaining is the Lettow-Vorbeck-Kaserne in Leer, East Frisia. The former Hamburg-Jenfeld barracks houses the "Tanzania Park", a group of large terracotta relief sculptures of Lettow-Vorbeck and his Askari soldiers, now closed to the public. Another sculpture of Lettow-Vorbeck and the Askaris is on display at Mühlenteich, near the Bismarck memorial at Friedrichsruh.

In early 2010, the City Council of Saarlouis renamed Von Lettow-Vorbeck-Straße, mainly for Lettow-Vorbeck's involvement in the 1920 Kapp Putsch. In Hanover, "Lettow-Vorbeck Straße" was renamed "Namibia Straße". In Wuppertal, Cuxhaven, Halle and Graz, Austria there are still streets named after General von Lettow-Vorbeck.

The dryosaurid dinosaur species Dysalotosaurus lettowvorbecki was named after Lettow-Vorbeck.

== Honours ==
He received the following orders and decorations:

- Kingdom of Prussia:
  - Officer of the Order of the Red Eagle, with Crown
  - Knight of the Order of the Prussian Crown, 3rd Class with Swords
  - Pour le Mérite (military), 4 November 1916; with Oak Leaves, 10 October 1917
  - Iron Cross, 1st and 2nd class
- Kingdom of Bavaria:
  - Knight of the Military Order of Max Joseph
  - Knight of the Military Merit Order, 4th Class with Swords and Crown
- (Saxe-Coburg and Gotha) (Duchy of Saxe-Altenburg) (Saxe-Meiningen) Ernestine duchies: Commander of the Saxe-Ernestine House Order, 2nd Class
- Württemberg: Knight of the Order of the Württemberg Crown, with Golden Lions
- Russian Empire: Knight of the Order of St. Stanislaus, 3rd Class with Swords

== In popular culture ==
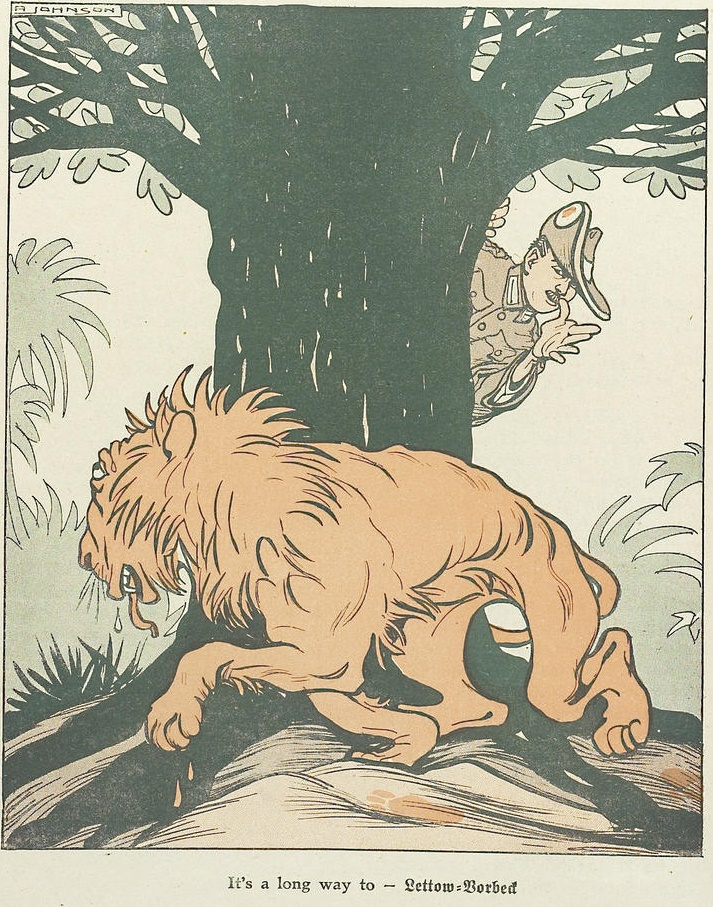
Cartoon (1918) showing Lettow-Vorbeck eluding the British lion in East Africa

Lettow-Vorbeck appears in a 1993 episode of the television series The Young Indiana Jones Chronicles. The episode, which was titled "The Phantom Train of Doom", begins with Indiana Jones as an officer in the Belgian Army during the First World War. Determined to destroy a Schutztruppe armoured train, Indiana takes General von Lettow-Vorbeck (played by Tom Bell) hostage and attempts to return with him behind Allied lines. When the Schutztruppe tracks them down, Indy draws his revolver to shoot the general, but decides to let him go. The general magnanimously gives him a compass so Indiana can find his way back to his lines, and the two part as friends.

Lettow-Vorbeck is the protagonist of The Ghosts of Africa, a 1980 historical novel by Anglo-Canadian novelist William Stevenson about the East African Campaign which highlighted the long-distance resupply mission of the German rigid airship L 59.

The many bureaucratic absurdities of the British campaign against General von Lettow-Vorbeck in German East Africa are satirized in William Boyd's 1983 anti-war novel An Ice-Cream War.

Lettow-Vorbeck also appears as a character in Peter Høeg's short story, "Journey into a Dark Heart", which is the opening story in his 1990 collection, Tales of the Night. In this story Høeg imagines Lettow-Vorbeck travelling through Africa by train at night accompanied by Joseph Conrad.

Much of the history of Lettow-Vorbeck's war campaign in East Africa is detailed in the book Speak Swahili, Dammit! (2011) by James Penhaligon, as well as in a novel of the same year, The Bridge Builders (Brobyggarna in Swedish) by Jan Guillou.

A German film, Lettow-Vorbeck: Der deutsch-ostafrikanische Imperativ, was produced in 1984.

== Works ==
- Lettow-Vorbeck, Paul Emil von, Heia Safari! Deutschlands Kampf in Ostafrika [Heia Safari! Germany's Campaign in East Africa]. Leipzig: Hase & Köhler. 1920.
- Lettow-Vorbeck, Paul Emil von, Meine Erinnerungen aus Ostafrika. Leipzig: Hase & Köhler, 1920. Published in Great Britain as My Reminiscences of East Africa. London: Hurst & Blackett, Paternoster House, 1920. U.S. edition entitled East African Campaigns with an introduction by John Gunther. New York: Robert Speller & Sons, 1957. My Reminiscences of East Africa at archive.org (English) (German)
- Lettow-Vorbeck, Paul Emil von, Die Weltkriegsspionage. München, Justin Moser. 1931.
- Lettow-Vorbeck, Paul Emil von, Mein Leben. Biberach an der Riss: Koehlers Verlag. 1957. – My Life. Loves Park, Illinois: Rilling Enterprises, 2012. First English translation.

== See also ==
- German colonial empire
- Hermann Detzner
- Ada Schnee
- Lettow
- William F.S. Edwards
