= Manual of arms =

Military instruction manual for the use of weapons

A manual of arms was an instruction book for handling and using weapons in formation, whether in the field or on parade. Such manuals were especially important in the matchlock and flintlock eras, when loading and firing was a complex and lengthy process typically carried out in close order. When capitalized, the term has reference to one of several important manuals, such as the British Army manual of 1764, the manual of Frederick the Great or Von Steuben's Regulations for the Order and Discipline of the Troops of the United States, adopted by the Continental Army in 1777. The positions and evolutions contained in such manuals have become the standard for parade drill throughout most of the world.

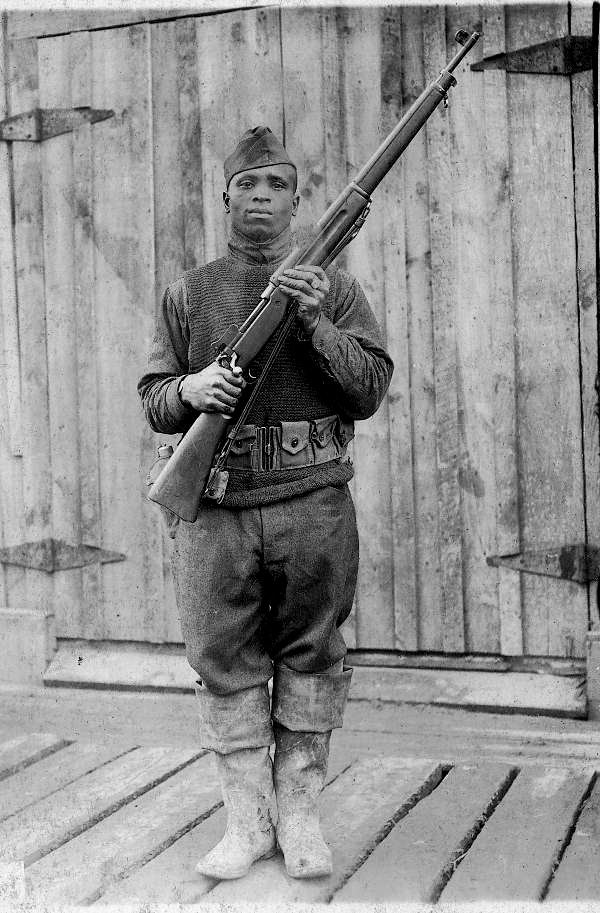
Port Arms

Typical examples of rules and procedures can be found in the 1764 manual. It was used by both sides at the start of the American Revolution.

- Stance: stand straight, head right, shoulders square, stomach in, chest out, heels close, toes turned out a little.
- Holding the weapon: on the left shoulder, forefinger and thumb to the side of the stock, the other three holding the butt.
- Timing: each motion to be done on a count of "one, two".

Such manuals contain various evolutions, such as the twelve or so steps needed to load, ready and fire, and steps for fixing bayonets, forming line (for firing), column (for bayonet charges) or square (for repelling cavalry).

A second example is the manual used for training of US Union troops in 1861. While not always dictating the stance (as reference is made to loading from horseback), specific instructions were given for drawing on command (specifically the rifle and pistol), loading, firing, cease-firing, inspecting and returning the weapons to their carrying position (slinging the carbine, or holstering the revolver).

During World War I, Askari troops under General Paul von Lettow-Vorbeck in German East Africa were taught the German manual of arms. In 1964 the West German government decided to pay the survivors for their service long ago, and set up an office in Tanganyika for this purpose. Hundreds of old men arrived and asked for their money, but almost none could provide physical evidence of having served. The bankers tested each by giving him a broomstick and ordering him in German to perform the manual of arms. They all passed.
