= Battle of Namacurra =

World War I battle in Portuguese Mozambique

- Part of the Portuguese campaign in Mozambique during World War I
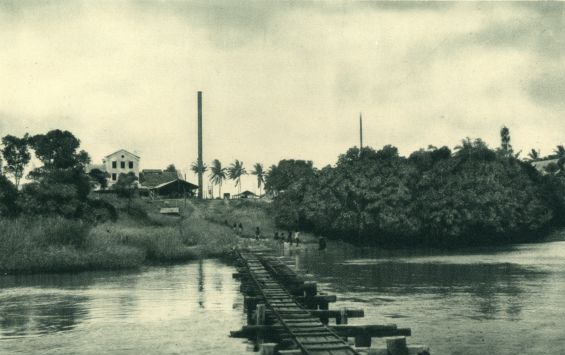
- The Namacurra River at the town of Namacurra, as pictured in a 1926 publication
| Date | 1–3 July 1918 |
| Location | Namacurra, Portuguese Mozambique |
| Result | German victory |

Belligerents
| Portugal; British Empire | Germany |

Commanders and leaders
| (United Kingdom) Eric Gore-Browne † | (German Empire) Paul von Lettow-Vorbeck (German Empire) Erich Müller |

Units involved
| 3 Portuguese battalions 2 British King's African Rifle companies | 3 German companies |

Casualties and losses
| 209 dead 540 captured | Unknown |

The Battle of Namacurra, part of the East African campaign of World War I (1914–1918), was fought from 1 to 3 July 1918 in central Portuguese Mozambique, a colony of the Portuguese Republic. Portugal and the British Empire, two Allied Powers, fought the German Empire, a Central Power, at the Namacurra River at the town of Namacurra.

In 1917, a German army from the colony of German East Africa began an incursion into bordering Mozambique. The Battle of Namacurra was the deadliest engagement of the campaign. Between the Portuguese and British soldiers, 209 died, while the German casualties are unknown. Portugal's losses greatly weakened its war effort in East Africa.

== Background ==
On 25 November 1917, during the East African campaign of World War I, a militia led by German general Paul von Lettow-Vorbeck crossed the Ruvuma River south, from German East Africa into Portuguese Mozambique. They continued southwards from then on. By the end of March 1918, British general Jacob van Deventer, whose troops were following Lettow-Vorbeck's troops in an attempt to encircle them, expected the latter to turn back into German East Africa. Instead, Lettow-Vorbeck kept going south, and British and Portuguese troops could not stand their ground to the Germans. The British Gold Coast Regiment withdrew their forces. At Ile, the defending Portuguese troops ran off after they spotted the Germans. They left behind a large amount of supplies, more than Lettow-Vorbeck could carry. Much of it was burned to prevent future use by the British or Portuguese.

At the time, the town of Namacurra had a newly established supply depot for the British and Portuguese armies, which contained "vast warehouses stuffed full of arms and ammunition, food, wine, and whiskey". It was connected by railroad to the nearby port town of Quelimane, where the British feared the Germans would seize vessels and escape from Africa.

== Battle ==
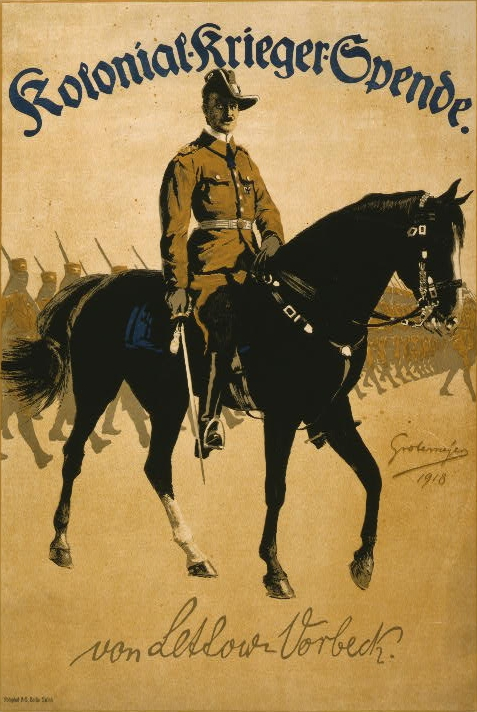
1918 poster of Paul von Lettow-Vorbeck leading African soldiers during the East African campaign; the top reads "Colonial War Funds"

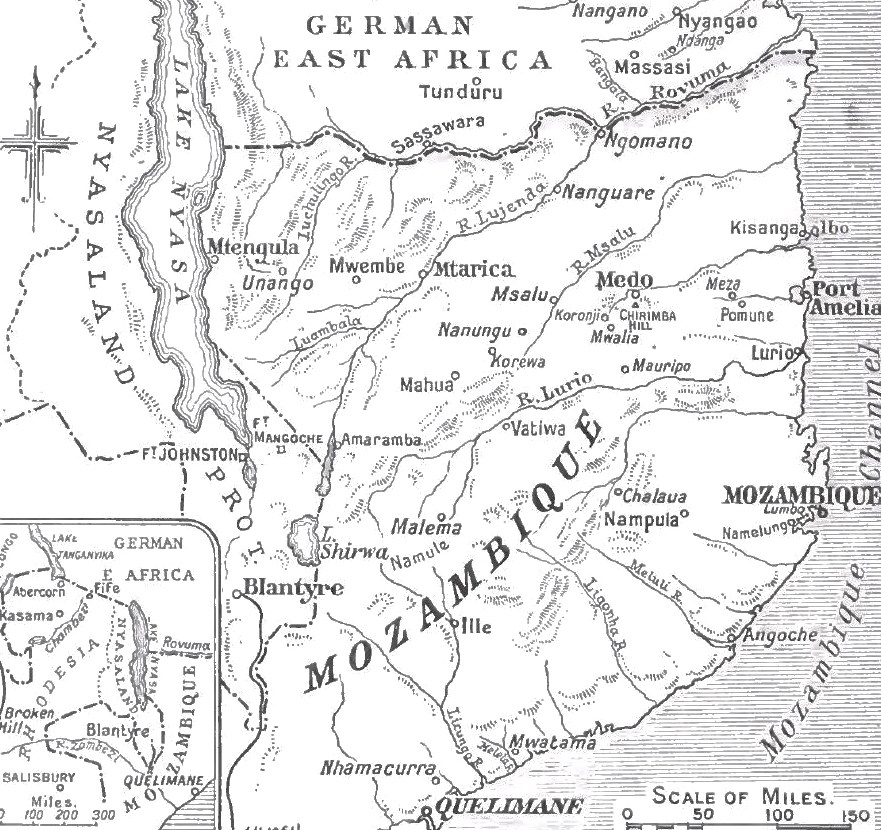
A map showing Portuguese Mozambique below German East Africa in 1917; the Ruvuma River is at the top (spelled Rovuma) and Namacurra is at the bottom (spelled Nhamacurra)

The battle started on 1 July 1918. It was the southernmost strike of Lettow-Vorbeck's campaign. The Portuguese offered greater resistance than they had at Ile. Three Portuguese battalions, aided by two British King's African Rifle companies commanded by Colonel Eric Gore-Browne, fought against three German companies commanded by Captain Erich Müller. By 3 July, Lettow-Vorbeck had brought out his main force. The Portuguese units were steadily pushed back, until they were forced to retreat across the Namacurra River. One hundred European and African men drowned, including Gore-Browne. The fighting ended on the afternoon of the 3rd.

== Aftermath ==
Of the ~100 engagements of Lettow-Vorbeck's campaign, Namacurra was the deadliest. 209 of the British and Portuguese died, and 540 were taken as prisoner. The Germans received the enemy spoils. Days later, the bodies of the men who drowned in the river were found downstream. Instead of going to Quelimane, the Germans looped back across the Namiurre River to Numarroe, and went north. For a few days, while the Germans were going north, van Deventer's forces kept going south to Quelimane. Van Deventer's forces, still chasing von Lettow, admitted defeat in September 1918. Lettow-Vorbeck eventually turned back into German East Africa.

Namacurra, as well as a native revolt against Portuguese misrule in Angoche, Mozambique, effectively ended Portugal's involvement in the East African campaign. Vorbeck's army kept fighting throughout the region, remaining undefeated by 25 November, when he surrendered his troops to the British in Northern Rhodesia upon learning of the Armistice of 11 November, which ended World War I.

== See also ==
- The Battle of Ngomano, in Mozambique in December 1917
- The Battle of Lioma, in Mozambique in August 1918

== Works cited ==
- Smith, David; Turner, Graham (2022). The East Africa Campaign 1914–18: Von Lettow-Vorbeck’s Masterpiece. Bloomsbury Publishing. ISBN 978-1-4728-4892-5.
- Gaudi, Robert (2017). African Kaiser: General Paul Von Lettow-Vorbeck and the Great War in Africa. Hurst. ISBN 978-1-8490-4867-5.
- Manela, Erez; Gerwarth, Robert (2014). Empires at War: 1911–1923. OUP Oxford. ISBN 978-0-1910-0694-4.
- Stapleton, Timothy J. (2013). A Military History of Africa: Volume 1. ABC-CLIO. ISBN 978-0-3133-9569-7.
- Abbott, Peter (2002). Armies in East Africa 1914–18. Bloomsbury USA. ISBN 978-1-8417-6489-4.
- Reigel, Corey W. (2015). The Last Great Safari: East Africa in World War I. Rowman & Littlefield Publishers. ISBN 978-1-4422-3593-9.
- Burg, David F.; Purcell, L. Edward (2010). Almanac of World War I. University Press of Kentucky. ISBN 978-0-8131-2745-3.
- Woodward, David R. (2009). World War I Almanac. Facts on File Inc. ISBN 978-1-4381-1896-3.
