= Battle of Dutumi =

1916 WWI battle in German East Africa

- Part of East African Campaign
Date	9–12 September 1916
Location	Dutumi, Bwakila Chini, German East Africa 7°22′40.13″S 37°48′7.42″E
Result	Allied victory

Belligerents
German Empire: German East Africa	South Africa

Commanders and leaders
(German Empire) Paul von Lettow-Vorbeck	(Union of South Africa) Jan Smuts (British Empire) Reginald Hoskins

Strength
2,000 soldiers 24 machine guns	

Casualties and losses
2 killed 12 wounded	90 killed
- Location within Tanzania Battle of Dutumi (Africa)

The Battle of Dutumi was fought during the East African Campaign of World War I.

== The Battle ==
After having gained control of the northern part of German East Africa and the Central Railway in the summer of 1916, British troops pushed the Germans troops further south. In September, the Germans set up a well-defended position south of the Dutumi River, some 15 miles east of Kisaki.

The 3rd Kashmir Rifles and the 57th Wilde's Rifles, followed by the 3rd King's African Rifles attacked the enemy on 10 September, but made little progress.
On the morning of 11 September, two companies of the 3rd King's African Rifles crossed the river, but were driven back by a German counterattack. The Gold Coast Regiment came up from reserve and joined the attack, but the German defense line remained intact.
The next morning the British vanguard found the German positions abandoned, and the pursuit was initiated. The British again encountered the Germans further south and another day of confused fighting in the dense vegetation followed.

On the morning of September 13th, the German troops had again disappeared, but now the exhausted British troops stopped the pursuit and occupied Kisaki on 14 September, where they only found sick and wounded Germans, who were left behind.
