= Namacurra =

Town in Zambezia, Mozambique

Coordinates: 17°29′31″S 37°01′44″E

Namacurra is a coastal district of Zambezia, a province in the center of Mozambique. According to the 2017 census, the district had a population of 214,924. It lies on the former railway between Quelimane and Vila de Mocuba.

== History ==
The Battle of Namacurra happened there in 1918 during World War I.

The district was severely affected by Tropical Cyclone Gombe in 2022.

== See also ==
- Railway stations in Mozambique
