= Bruno Brivonesi =

Italian admiral (1886–1970)

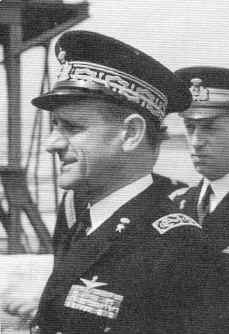
- Born: 16 July 1886; Ancona, Marche, Italy
- Died: 1970; Rome, Latium, Italy
- Military career
- Allegiance: Kingdom of Italy
- Branch: Regia Marina
- Service years: 1906–1946
- Rank: Ammiraglio di Divisione (Vice Admiral)
- Commands: V.1 Città di Jesi (airship); Ferrara air base; Capua air base; M 6 (airship); PV 3 (airship); Nicolò Zeno (destroyer); Italian Far East Naval Command; Trento (heavy cruiser); Italian Naval Academy; Naval Command Libya; 3rd Naval Division; Naval Command Sardinia
- Conflicts: Italo-Turkish War; World War I; Adriatic Campaign; World War II; Battle of the Mediterranean; Operation Halberd; Battle of the Duisburg Convoy; Battle of Magdalene
- Awards: Silver Medal of Military Valor (four times); War Merit Cross; Military Order of Savoy

Bruno Brivonesi (16 July 1886 – 1970) was an Italian admiral during World War II. His brother, Bruto, was also an admiral.

== Early life and career ==
Brivonesi was born in Ancona in 1886, and he entered the Italian Naval Academy after high school, in 1906. After graduating as an ensign, he joined the crew of the battleship Regina Margherita. In 1908, he participated in the rescue efforts after the 1908 Messina earthquake, following which he received a Bronze Civil Medal.

When the Royal Italian Navy decided to use airships for its Air Service, Brivonesi attended the first pilot training programme, which took place in 1910 in Rome and nearby Vigna de Valle in Bracciano. During breaks Brivonesi, along with the other cadets (eight from the Army and four from the Navy), designed and built a glider, which he later flew. After obtaining a dirigible pilot licence, he joined the crew of the airship P 2, which was in the final stages of construction. At the end of 1910, P 2 was stationed in Campalto, Venice; Brivonesi took part in flights over Northeastern Italy and later moved to Milan and took part in military exercises near Casale Monferrato (in this instance, Victor Emanuel III and Paolo Thaon di Revel were passengers on his airship).

In 1911, following the outbreak of the Italo-Turkish War, the Italian Navy sent P 2 and another airship, P 3, to Libya. On board P 2, Brivonesi participated in some of the first aerial warfare operations in history; his first action was a reconnaissance mission over the Zanzur area on 5 March 1912, after which he took part in several reconnaissance and bombing missions, which earned him a Silver Medal of Military Valor and appointment to executive officer of the airship.

Brivonesi went back to Italy at the beginning of 1913; as the Italian Navy was planning to equip its capital ships with floatplanes, he attended a course in Venice and obtained a floatplane pilot licence. He was then assigned to the battleship Dante Alighieri, with a Curtiss floatplane; during the test flight, however, his airplane crashed into the sea, but he was uninjured. The plane was repaired and Dante Alighieri started a trip with stops in several Italian ports; at each stop, Brivonesi performed test flights with his floatplane, and during one of these flights he reached a height of about 1,000 meters, a world record (for floatplanes) at that time. After the trip was over, Brivonesi went back to Venice and started flying with a newly acquired Breguet floatplane.

== World War I ==
At the beginning of World War I, the Italian Navy preferred airships over floatplanes, which were still considered to be unreliable, and Brivonesi was appointed executive officer of the airship Città di Jesi. On 23 May 1915, right before Italy's declaration of war on Austria-Hungary, Città di Jesi took off from Ferrara to carry out a bombing of the Pola naval arsenal, but the mission had to be aborted because of bad weather and engine problems. A month later, Brivonesi (with the rank of lieutenant) was given command both of Città di Jesi and of the Ferrara air base.

On 5 August 1915, Brivonesi flew Città di Jesi on a new nocturnal attempt to bomb Pola; the airship was able to reach the objective and drop its bombs, but was then hit by anti-aircraft fire, which pierced the envelope, that started leaking gas. Città di Jesi was able to get out of range of the AA guns, but gradually lost altitude and finally ditched in the sea, in front of the Austrian base. The six-man crew, including Brivonesi and a young Raffaele de Courten, was captured and sent to the Mauthausen prisoner-of-war camp. Conditions in Mauthausen were appalling, and 25% of the POWs (including 5,000 Italians) died there of hunger, illness and cold, although the treatment of officers was much better than the treatment of soldiers. Since prisoners who were declared invalid were repatriated, Brivonesi successfully simulated tuberculosis and was repatriated in May 1917, following a prisoner exchange. For his action over Pola, Brivonesi was awarded a second Silver Medal of Military Valor; in 1933 he would write a book about this experience, Verso Mauthausen (Towards Mauthausen).

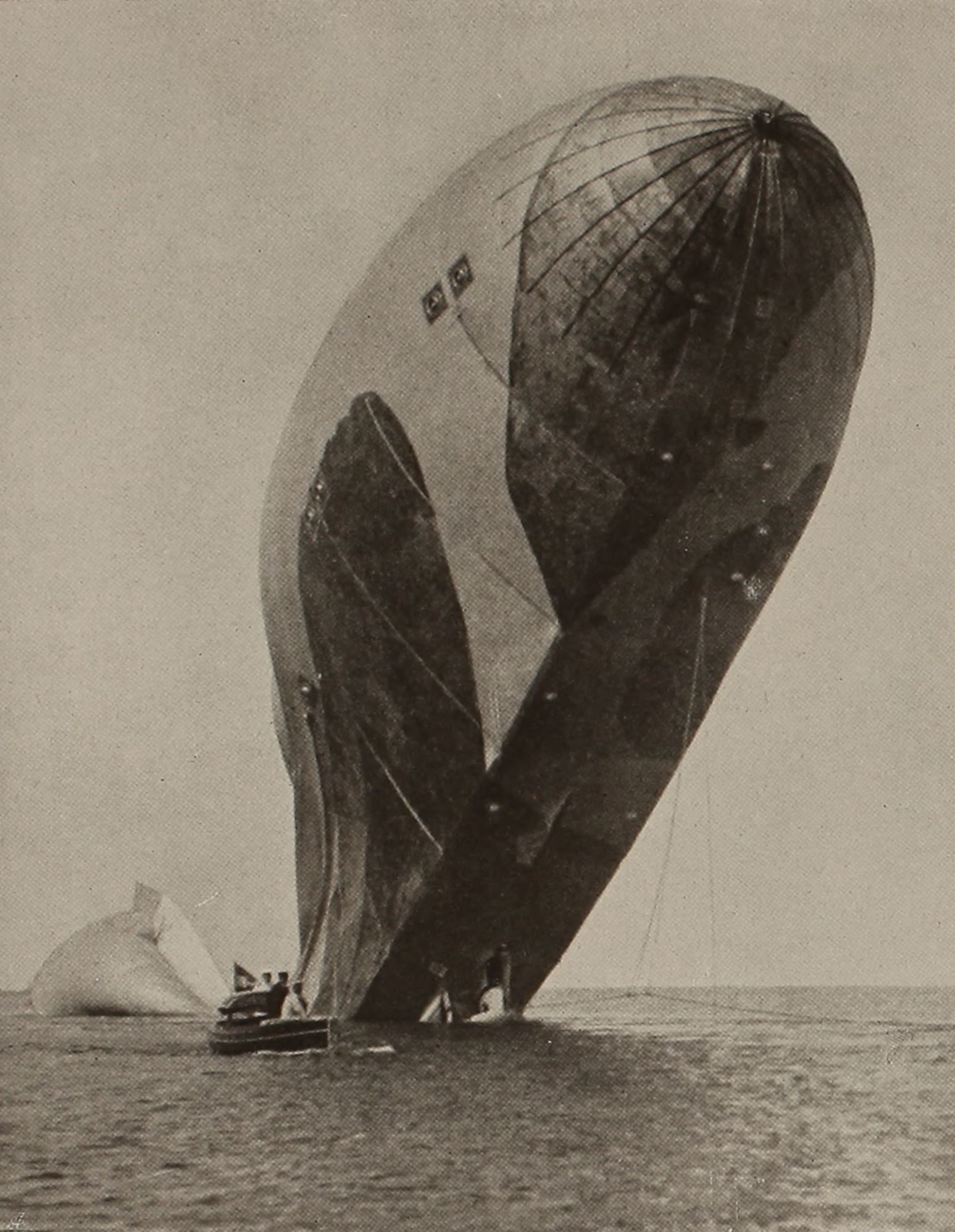
V.1 Città di Jesi crashed near the Veruda Island, 6 August 1915

After returning to Italy, Brivonesi started flying again, now with the new Macchi L.3 floatplanes, in Venice. He was later tasked with testing aircraft produced by the Ducrot factory in Palermo; after a short time he was appointed commander of a new naval air base in Capua, from where Caproni bombers would have been used, but the war ended before the building of the base was completed.

== Interwar years ==
After the end of World War I Brivonesi was given command of the airship M 6, based in Ciampino and later in Grottaglie, and later of the airship PV 3. In 1922 PV 3 was caught in a storm while flying near Crotone; the dirigible crashed, but Brivonesi was able to save his crew, gaining another Silver Medal of Military Valor. His last dirigible command was one of the three Zeppelins ceded by Germany to Italy as war reparations.

In March 1923, when the Regia Aeronautica was created, part of the personnel of the Italian Navy air service chose to join the new armed force; Brivonesi instead decided to stay in the Navy. Between 1923 and 1929 Brivonesi, promoted to lieutenant commander, was attaché at the League of Nations, holding various jobs in Europe.

Between 1930 and 1931, he was commanding officer of the destroyer Nicolò Zeno, and in 1932, he was given command of the Taranto naval base defence. While in Taranto, on 8 February 1933, a criminal shot and killed one of his relatives; Brivonesi, though unarmed, pursued him across rooftops, and arrested him. For this, he was awarded a Silver Civil Medal (later commuted into another Silver Medal of Military Valor).

Brivonesi was then given command of the Italian Navy detachment in Shanghai and of the Italian Far East Naval Command, which he held from 20 March 1934 to 1 September 1935. Back in Italy, he became a liaison officer between the navy and the air force in Rome. Between 8 November 1935 and 6 September 1936, as a captain, he commanded the heavy cruiser Trento, and between the end of 1936 and 1939 he was naval attaché at the Italian embassy in London. In July 1938, by then a rear admiral, he commanded the training ships Amerigo Vespucci and Cristoforo Colombo during a training cruise to Ireland. In 1939, he assumed command of the Livorno Naval Academy.

== World War II ==
When Italy entered World War II, on 10 June 1940, Brivonesi (by then a vice admiral) was the commander of the Italian naval forces in Libya, with a seat in Bengasi (a command that he had assumed on 24 April of the same year). Under his command were the old armoured cruiser San Giorgio, one destroyer flotilla with four ships, one torpedo boat flotilla with four ships, two submarine flotillas with ten boats, six gunboats, one auxiliary minelayer and three tankers.

On 18 August 1940, Brivonesi sailed from Bengasi on board the auxiliary minelayer Monte Gargano; after evading an attack by Rorqual, the ship rendezvoused with the submarine Iride and the torpedo boat Calipso in the Gulf of Bomba for the preparations of Operation G.A. 1, a first attempt by the Tenth Light Flotilla to attack the harbour of Alexandria. Monte Gargano was there to act as a replenishment ship for the other two vessels. British aircraft flying nearby, however, noticed the unusual presence of three ships in the usually deserted Gulf of Bomba, and Fairey Swordfish torpedo bombers were sent to attack them on 22 August: both Iride and Monte Gargano were sunk, thus sanctioning the failure of the operation before it could start. Brivonesi and the entire crew of Monte Gargano were able to abandon ship before she capsized and sank in shallow waters.

On 24 April 1941, Brivonesi left Libya and assumed command of the 3rd Naval Division (heavy cruisers Trento, Trieste, and Bolzano), based in Messina, with Trieste as flagship. On 24 May 1941, Brivonesi's 3rd Division (Trieste, Bolzano and the destroyers Ascari, Lanciere and Corazziere) was providing distant escort to a troop convoy (four troop transports with one destroyer and four torpedo boats as close escort), when HMS Upholder torpedoed one of the troopships, Conte Rosso, which sank with the loss of 1,297 men.

Between 26 and 29 September 1941, Brivonesi and the 3rd Division (Trento, Trieste, and Gorizia, in addition to the destroyers Ascari, Lanciere, Corazziere and Carabiniere) sailed from Messina as part of the force tasked with countering Operation Halberd. The Italian force, however, did not meet the British force, and there was no battle.

As the commander of the 3rd Division, Brivonesi was the protagonist of the Italian defeat in the Battle of the Duisburg Convoy. On 8 November 1941, Brivonesi sailed from Messina with Trieste, Trento and the 13th Destroyer Flotilla (Granatiere, Bersagliere, Fuciliere, Alpino) as distant escort of the "Beta" convoy (later known as the "Duisburg" convoy), which consisted of 7 merchant ships (the Italian cargo ships Maria, Sagitta and Rina Corrado, the Italian tankers Conte di Misurata and Minatitlan and the German cargo ships Duisburg and San Marco, laden with 389 vehicles, 34,473 long tons of munitions and matériel and 17,281 long tons of fuel) with a close escort of six destroyers (under the command of Captain Ugo Bisciani on Maestrale). The convoy was spotted by a British reconnaissance plane, and Force K (light cruisers Aurora and Penelope and destroyers Lance and Lively) sailed from Malta to intercept. The attack happened during the following night; Force K took the close escort by surprise, sank one destroyer (Fulmine) and disabled another (Grecale), then proceeded to sink all the seven merchants, while the confused and disarticulated reaction of the other destroyers (left without orders, as Maestrale's radio antenna was shot away) was unable to stop or damage the British ships. Brivonesi's 3rd Division, at the time of the attack (00:57 on 9 November), was sailing at 12 knots about three miles astern and to the east of the convoy. The Division only realized that the convoy was being attacked when they spotted the flash of the British guns; shortly before, at 00:30, Trieste had intercepted a coded message of unknown source and meaning (the source was Force K), and Brivonesi was about to send a general alert to all his ships, when the battle started. Trieste and Trento opened fire on Force K at 1:03, from a distance of 9,000-10,000 meters; Brivonesi's subsequent manoeuvre later drew heavy criticism: instead of turning southeast, where Force K was, to close in on the British ships and attack them at once, he turned starboard so that his cruisers could bring all guns to bear, which required several minutes. Brivonesi's ships briefly assumed a southerly course (thus distancing themselves from Force K even more), then turned to port and then to starboard, advancing at a speed of only 15-16 knots, less than half the speed that they could keep. Force K kept manoeuvring around the convoy so that the latter was constantly between the British ships and the Italian Division, which caused the blazing merchants and their smoke to hamper the aim of the Italian gunners. At 1:12 Brivonesi ordered to increase speed to 18 knots and at 1:25 to 24 knots, but by then the distance had risen to 17,000 meters, and he ordered to cease fire, as it was pointless. At 1:29 Brivonesi ordered to turn north, in order to intercept the Force K when the latter would turn back towards Malta (by then the convoy was completely destroyed). Meanwhile, however, Supermarina (the Italian Navy high command) had informed him that the risk of a torpedo bomber attack on his ships was high; as they were outside of Malta's aircraft's reach, Brivonesi believed that a British aircraft carrier was in the area. Upon realising that the fires of the disabled merchant ships lit up his ships, making them easier targets for submarines as well as aircraft, Brivonesi ordered to cease fire, leave the area and assume a northwesterly course, at 1:32. Overall, Trieste and Trento had fired 207 8-inch shells, without scoring any hits. The 3rd Division only returned to the area after a few hours, to cover the search and rescue operation, during which the destroyer Libeccio was sunk by HMS Upholder and Trento was narrowly missed by a torpedo.

Following this disaster, Brivonesi was removed from command and court martialled by the Rome military tribunal under accusation of "loss of naval ship (…) caused by lack of adherence to usual engagement rules". The inquiry and trial, however, resulted in Brivonesi's acquittal, on 5 July 1942. Admiral Angelo Iachino had spoken in favour of Brivonesi, and it is likely that his acquittal was also due to the will to cover up other responsibilities in the Navy commands, such as the inadequate training of the crews in nocturnal combat.

After his acquittal, Brivonesi was appointed Adjunct Deputy Chief of Staff at Supermarina and later given command of the Sardinia Naval Command, with seat in La Maddalena. On 7 August 1943, Benito Mussolini, following his destitution and arrest on 25 July, was sent to La Maddalena and confined there, under Brivonesi's responsibility. Mussolini despised Brivonesi since the Duisburg convoy disaster, and relations between them remained cold. On 27 August, Mussolini left La Maddalena to be imprisoned at Campo Imperatore.

On 7 September 1943, Brivonesi was summoned to Rome and informed by Raffaele de Courten that in a short time Germany and Italy may no longer have been allies, and that Italian forces would have to face hostile behaviour by the Germans. He went back to La Maddalena on 8 September, and there he learned from the radio of the armistice of Cassibile. Brivonesi's forces heavily outnumbered the German troops in the area, but they included Blackshirts of doubtful allegiance, and most Italian navy personnel available were ragtag units of untrained and even unarmed men. Having received conflicting orders (by general Antonio Basso, his direct superior in Sardinia, to allow the Germans to pass through La Maddalena and evacuate their troops to Corsica; by Supermarina, to capture German military equipment), Brivonesi did not organize any defense or order resistance, and was de facto taken prisoner in the Naval Command building by the German forces, who swiftly occupied all key points and military buildings in La Maddalena. After an "agreement" with the German commander, and in compliance with orders from Basso, Brivonesi ordered all his men not to react to the Germans, allowed the Germans to use the harbour to ferry their troops to Corsica, and – under German armed guard – made a tour of his positions (still manned by Italian personnel, who had kept their weapons) recommending "calm". The German occupation of La Maddalena had tragic consequences for the battle fleet, which had sailed from La Spezia heading there (where Brivonesi was to deliver to Bergamini some documents, including one with the conditions of the armistice): the ships had to turn away and were attacked by the Luftwaffe, which sank the battleship Roma off Asinara, killing admiral Carlo Bergamini and 1,392 men. On 12 September, Brivonesi was put under arrest by the German commander. On 13 September, after days of tension, incidents broke out between Italians and Germans, following which the Italian forces, having been reorganized by Captain Carlo Avegno (the commander of the La Maddalena Naval Base, who was later killed in the fighting), attacked the Germans and captured 250 prisoners. Brivonesi was released by the Germans to order his men to release the German prisoners and return their weapons to them; initially, his men refused to comply, but the prisoners were freed on the following day. The Germans completed their evacuation and left La Maddalena on 14 September. Brivonesi remained in command of the Italian naval forces in Sardinia till 1944.

Brivonesi left the Navy in April 1946. In 1952, a book by Antonino Trizzino, Navi e poltrone, heavily criticised Brivonesi's behaviour on 9 November 1941, practically accusing him of cowardice; Brivonesi sued Trizzino for defamation, and he won at first instance, but lost on appeal. He spent his later life between Rome and Marche, and he died in Rome in 1970.
