= Carlo Avegno =

Italian naval officer

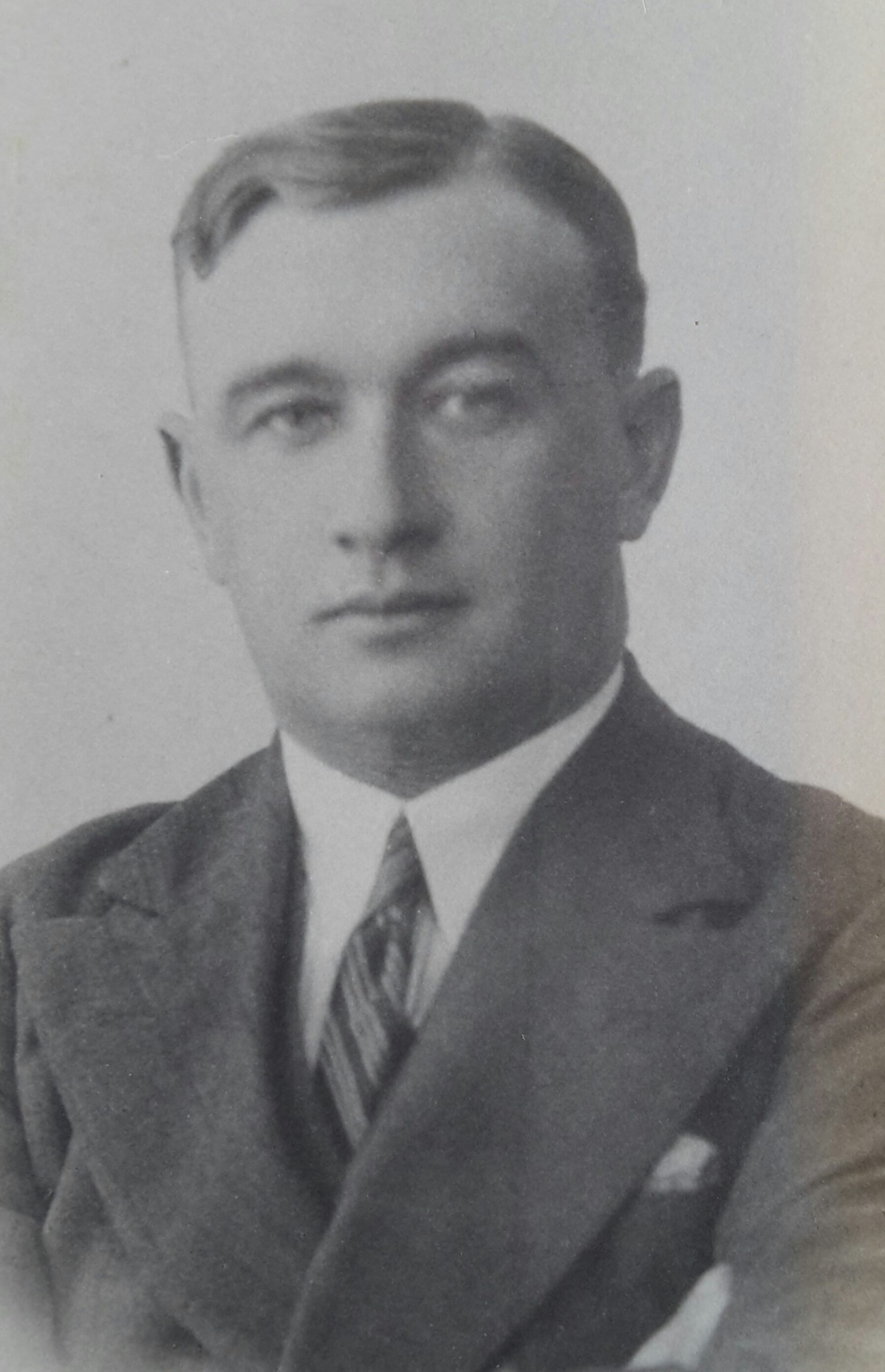
- Born: 6 June 1900; Meina, Kingdom of Italy
- Died: 13 September 1943 (aged 43); La Maddalena, Kingdom of Italy
- Military career
- Allegiance: Kingdom of Italy
- Branch: Regia Marina
- Service years: 1913–1943
- Rank: Captain
- Commands: Baleno (destroyer); Francesco Crispi (destroyer); Corazziere (destroyer); La Maddalena Naval Command
- Conflicts: World War I; Battle of the Piave river; World War II; Battle of Punta Stilo; Battle of Cape Spartivento; Operation Achse; Battle of Magdalene †
- Awards: Gold Medal of Military Valor (posthumous); Silver Medal of Military Valor; Bronze Medal of Military Valor (twice); War Cross for Military Valor (twice)

Carlo Avegno (Meina, 6 June 1900 – La Maddalena, 13 September 1943) was an Italian naval officer during World War II.

== Biography ==
He was born in the province of Novara in 1900, and attended the Royal Naval Academy of Livorno from 30 September 1913 to 1 October 1917, when he graduated as ensign. He participated in the First World War aboard the battleship Regina Elena and on the floating batteries of the Naval Brigade on the during the battle of the Piave. After the war he was promoted to sub-lieutenant on 26 September 1918, to lieutenant on 8 December 1926, and to lieutenant commander on 16 April 1931. In 1933 he was executive officer of the training ship Cristoforo Colombo during a training cruise in the Atlantic Ocean, in 1934-1935 he commanded the destroyer Baleno, and from September 23, 1935 he was vice deputy commander of the Livorno Naval Academy.

On 1 February 1936 he was promoted to commander, and on 16 May he became executive officer of the light cruiser Giovanni delle Bande Nere. From 1937 to 1939 he served at the Italian East Africa Armed Forces High Command in Addis Ababa, and from 1939 to 1940 he commanded the destroyer Francesco Crispi, stationed in the Dodecanese. After the entry of the Kingdom of Italy into World War II, on 10 June 1940, he assumed command of the destroyer Corazziere, participating in the battle of Punta Stilo and in the battle of Cape Spartivento. From December 1940 to January 1943 he was chief of staff of the naval commands of Benghazi and Tripoli, being promoted to captain on 12 November 1941; for his activities in North Africa he was awarded a Silver and a Bronze Medal of Military Valor.

On 27 May 1943 he was appointed commander of the La Maddalena Naval Command, a post he held until the Armistice of Cassibile in September. After the Armistice, German troops entered the La Maddalena naval base and captured Admiral Bruno Brivonesi, naval commander of Sardinia, who ordered his men to stand down and allow the Germans to use the harbour for the evacuation of their troops towards Corsica; on 13 September, however, incidents broke out between Italians and Germans which soon developed into a full-scale revolt against the Germans by the Italian garrison, of which Avegno assumed command, leading a platoon of Carabinieri and soldiers from the 391st Coastal Battalion in the attack on the Admiralty headquarters, where Brivonesi was held prisoner. The uprising resulted in the capture of 250 German prisoners and in the release of Brivonesi, who however ordered his men to allow the Germans to complete their withdrawal towards Corsica. Avegno was killed in action by machine gun fire during the fighting, and posthumously awarded the Gold Medal of Military Valor.
