= Action of 8 June 1915 =

Air and naval action on the World War I Adriatic warfare on 8 June 1915

- Part of Adriatic campaign of World War I
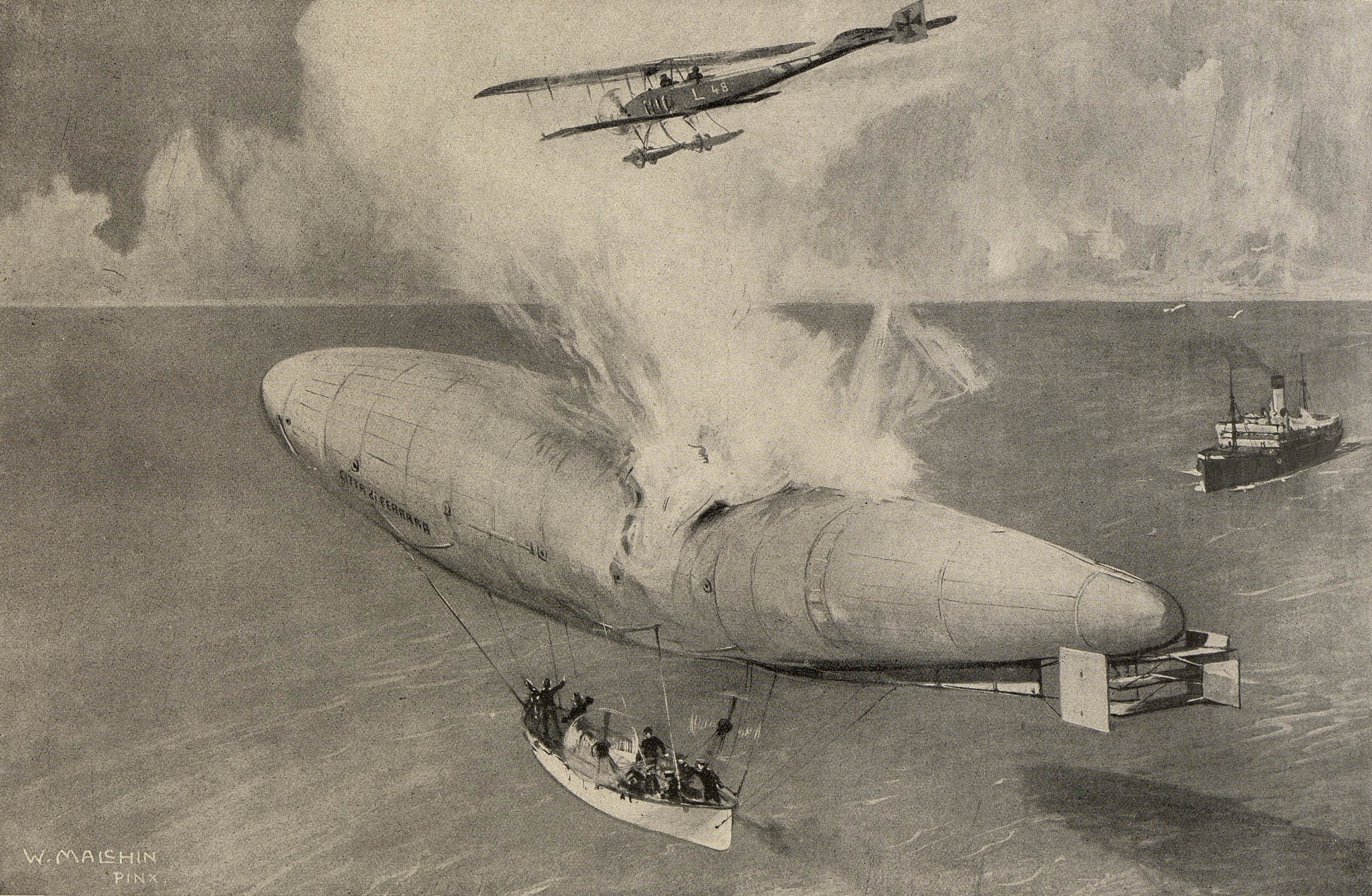
- Austro-Hungarian L48 seaplane attacking M.2 Città di Ferrara(illustration by Wilhelm Malchin)
| Date | 8 June 1915 |
| Location | c. 20 km from Premura, Vis Island, Adriatic Sea |
| Result | Austro-Hungarian victory |

Belligerents
| Austria-Hungary | Italy |

Commanders and leaders
| Lschlt. Gustav Klasing Schiesskommandant Hans Fritsche von Crouenwald | Castruccio Castracane degli Antelminelli |

Strength
| L48 seaplane several torpedo boats | M.2 Città di Ferrara marine airship |

Casualties and losses
| None | 2 killed 7 injured and captured 1 airship destroyed |

The Action of 8 June 1915 was a combined air and naval clash between the Italian airship M.2 Città di Ferrara and Austro-Hungarian Navy L48 seaplane and two military vessels near the coast of north-eastern Italy as a part of Adriatic campaign of World War I. The airship was chased after a bomb raid on Fiume (present-day Rijeka) by an air and navy patrol while the Austro-Hungarian aircraft crew was able to destroy the airship in the air. This incident is marked in aviation history as the first case of an airship being shot down by another aircraft.

== Background ==
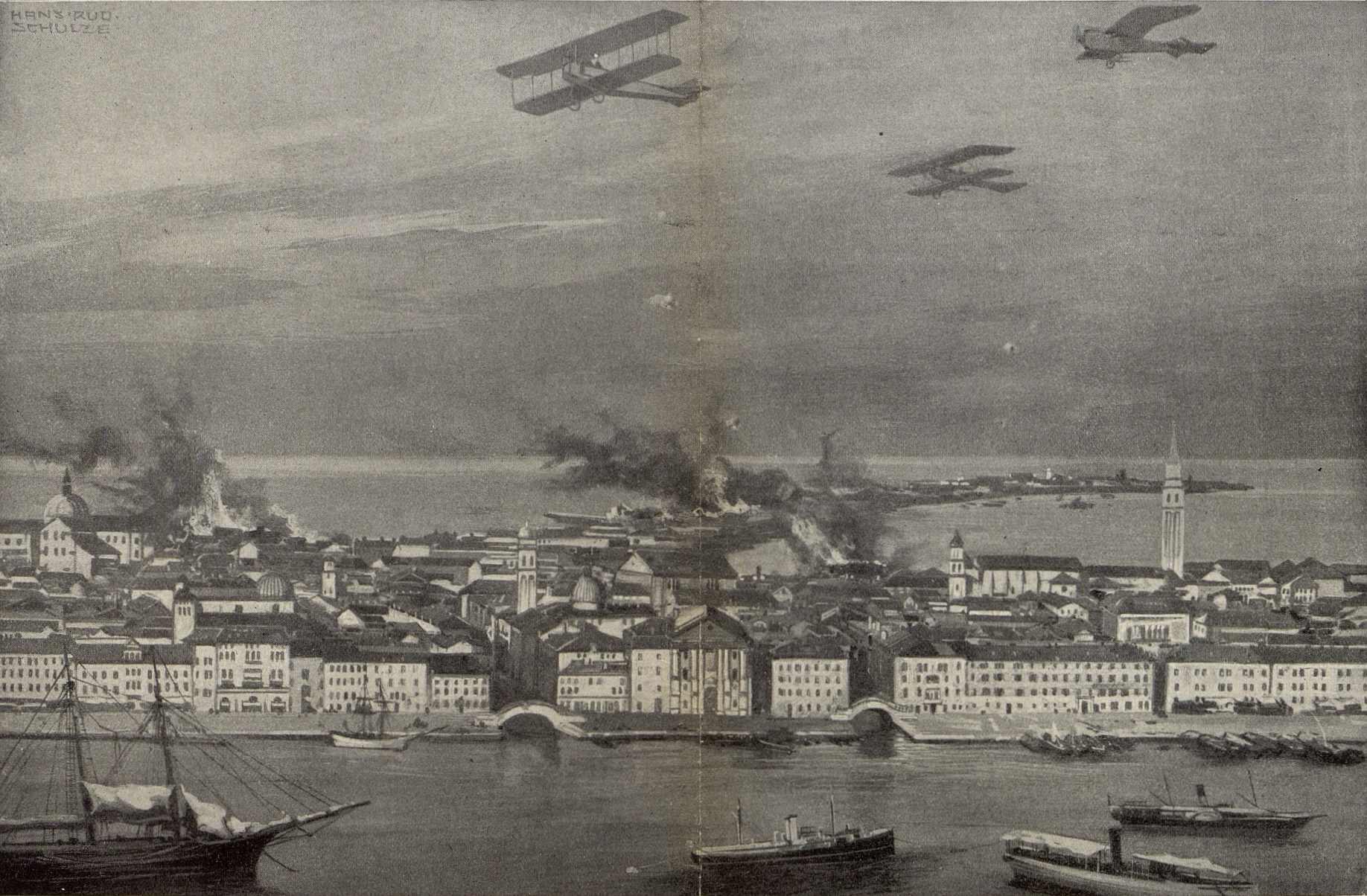
The first bombardment of Venice by Austro-Hungarian naval aircraft four hours after Italy declared war (illustration by H. R. Schulze, 1915)

Air and naval actions started shortly after the Italian Kingdom entered the war on the Allied side on 24 May 1915. Just a few hours after this act Italian city of Venice was hit by an air raid by Austro-Hungarian Air Force planes, Austro-Hungarian navy then proceeded a coastal bombardment raid on the port of Ancona. Italians responded with an attack on 23 and 24 May, when the V.1 Città di Jesi M.2 Città di Ferrara had the task of carrying out an incursion on the enemy naval stronghold of Pula. Despite harsh weather, airships managed to reach their target, drop bombs on a coastal facilities and probably even damage an Austro-Hungarian destroyer SMS Velebit. Threatened by two enemy seaplanes, the commander suspended the action and returned to the Jesi airfield. On 30 May Città di Ferrara took off from the Campalto airport near Venice to bomb Pula again, also filling its task successfully.

== Action ==
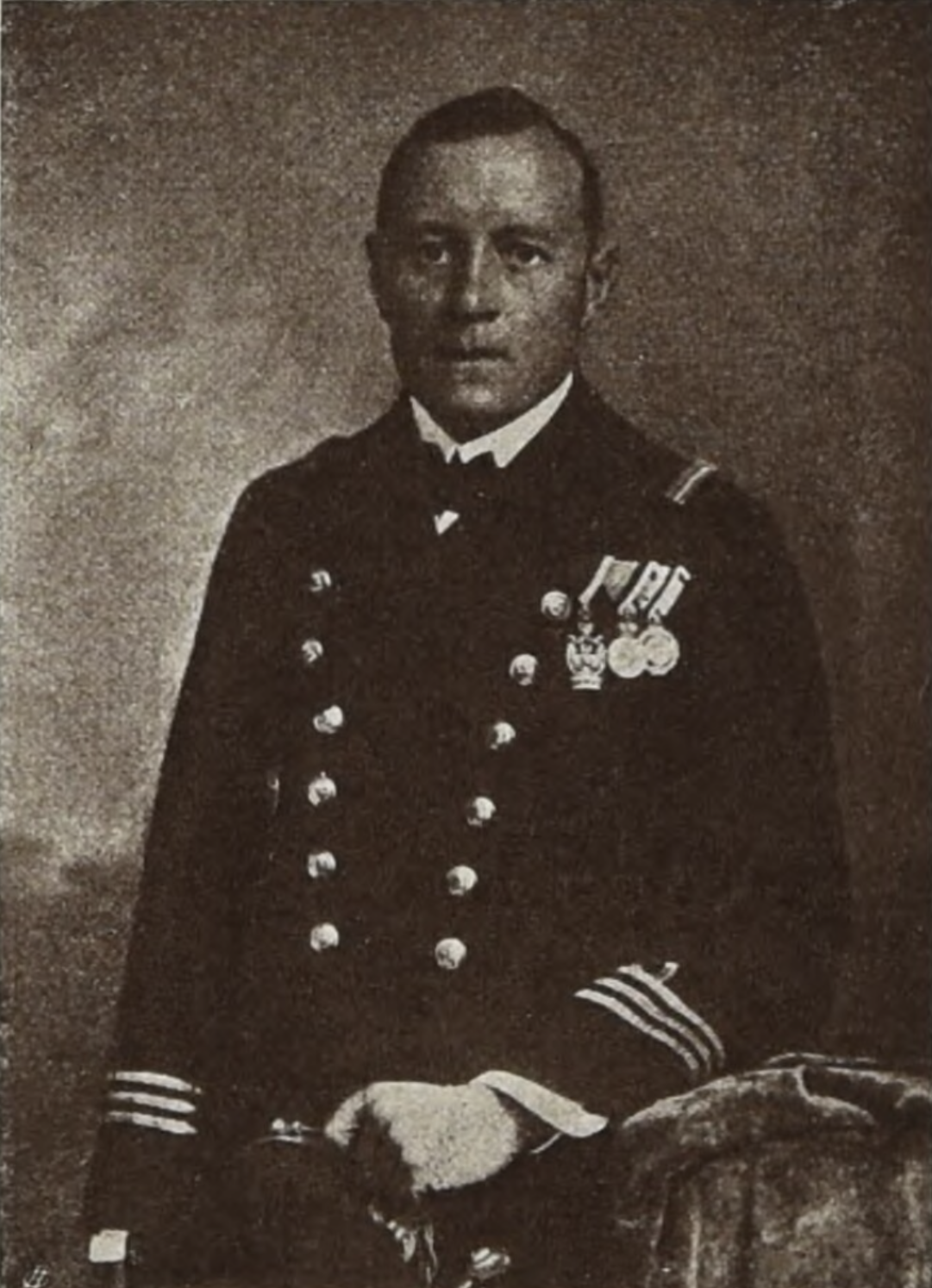
Marine pilot Gustav Klasing (c. 1915)

On 8 June 1915 M.2 Città di Ferrara under the command of captain Castruccio Castracane degli Antelminelli was instructed to proceed on a bombing mission against the Whitehead torpedo factories and the Ganz & Co. Danubius shipyards in Fiume. During the raid the airship was hit and seriously damaged by enemy anti-aircraft artillery fire. Aircraft flying in a low height permanently loosing gas of its body was approximately 20 km from Premuda then reached by the Austro-Hungarian seaplane Lohner L 48 piloted by Lschlt. Gustav Klasing with Schiesskommandant (artillerist) Hans Fritsche von Crouenwald as an observer, which took off from its Fiume base after the air raid. Also several Austro-Hungarian torpedo boats followed the airship from Fiume.

Klasing and Frische at first attacked the airship with machine gun fire without having any mayor effect - M.2 continued on its escape. After the Austro-Hungarian aviators ran out of ammunition, Klasing then managed to get his plane about 15 meters from the airship and then the crew shot two flares into the airship. The second shot caused an explosion of hydrogen gas, the airship body started to burn and the airship fell into the sea.

== Aftermath ==
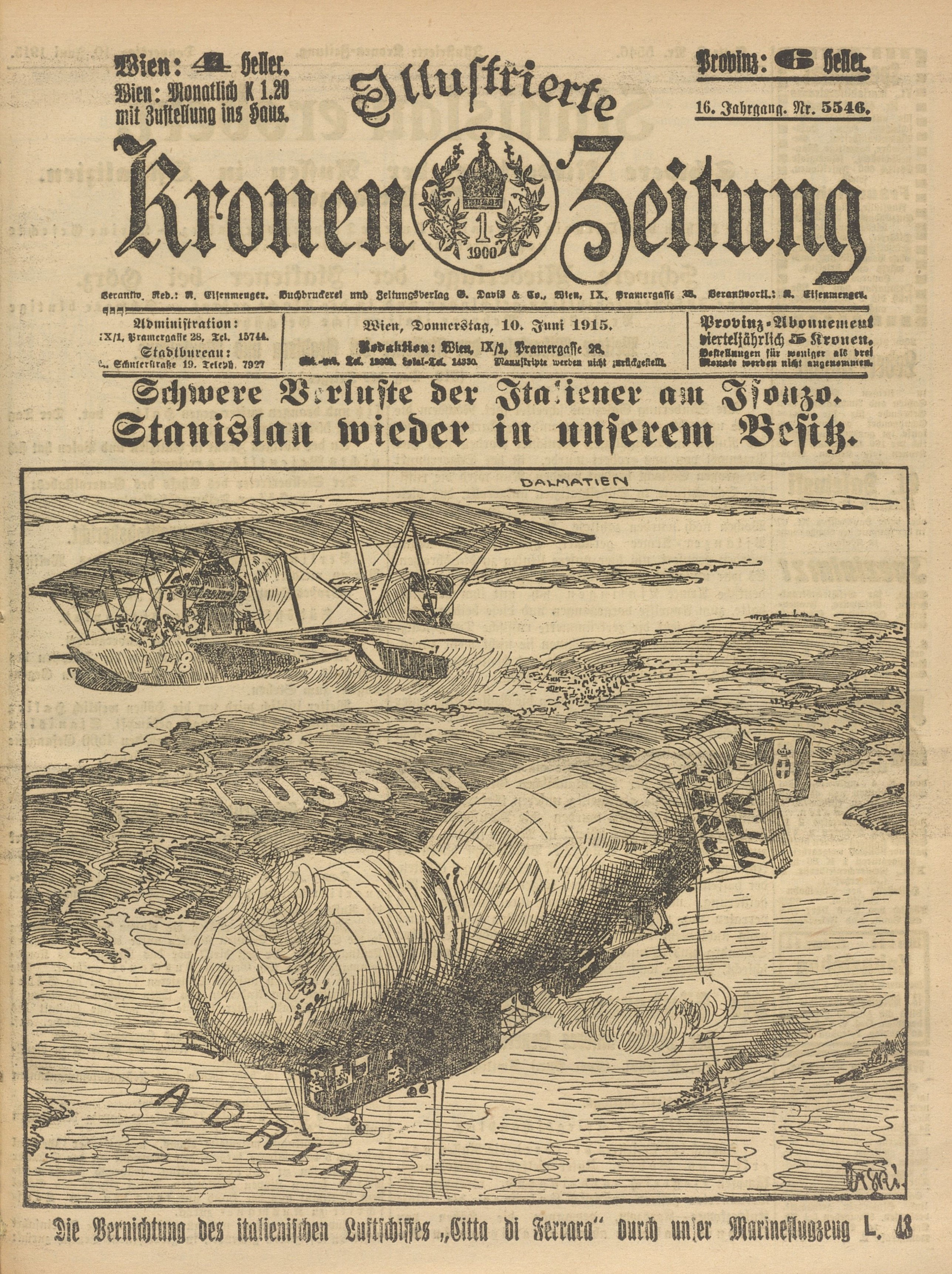
Front page of the Austro-Hungarian journal Illustrierte Kronen Zeitung, 10 June 1915

Impact on the water or drowning caused the death of two crew members, while the survivors were picked up by an Austro-Hungarian torpedo boat and taken prisoner. Residues of the ship were collected and taken to Fiume.

The event was quickly used as Austro-Hungarian war propaganda and in Central Power countries media various depictions of an incident appeared.

The shooting down of the M.2 airship entered into military aviation history as the first successful attack of a plane on an airship.

== See also ==
- M.2 Città di Ferrara
- Lohner L

== Bibliography ==
- Albrich, Thomas; Hagen, Nikolaus, eds. (2019). Österreich-Ungarns Fliegerasse im Ersten Weltkrieg 1914–1918 (in German). Innsbruck: Universitätsverlag Wagner. ISBN 978-3-7030-0997-6.
- Luigi Mancini, ed. (1936). Grande Enciclopedia Aeronautica (in Italian). Milan: Edizioni Aeronautica.
