= M.2 Città di Ferrara =

Royal Italian Navy airship

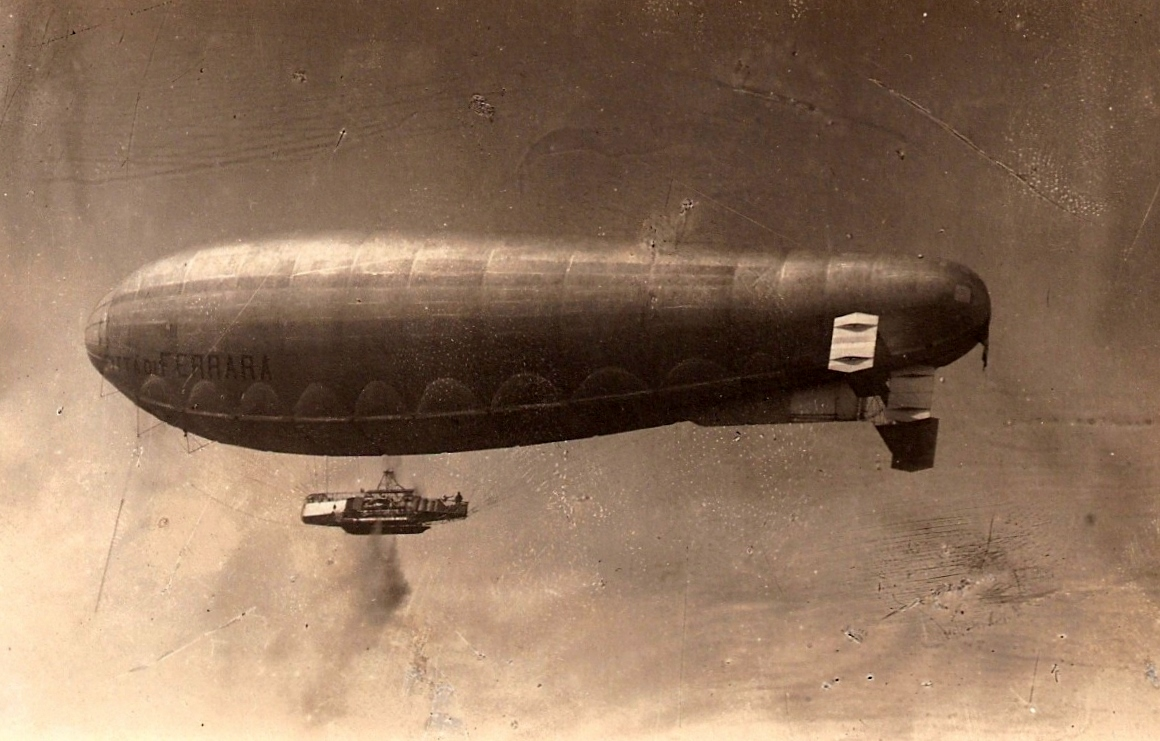
- M.2 Città di Ferrara (1914)

General information
- Type: Patrol airship
- National origin: Italy
- Manufacturer: Stabilimento Costruzioni Aeronautiche, Rome
- Designer: Gaetano Crocco, Ottavio Ricaldoni
- Status: lost in action 8 June 1915
- Primary user: Regia Marina (Royal Italian Navy)
- Number built: 1

History
- Introduction date: 26 May 1913
- First flight: 13 July 1913

M.2 Città di Ferrara was a semi-rigid military single-gondola airship made in 1910 by Stabilimento Costruzioni Aeronautiche at the Vigna di Valle Air Base in Bracciano. It was designed by Gaetano Crocco and Ottavio Ricaldoni as the second aircraft of the "M-Class" airships and operated by the Servizio Aeronautico (Aeronautical Service) of Italy’s Regia Marina (Royal Navy). During the action of 8 June 1915 it was destroyed by a seaplane of the Austro-Hungarian Aviation Troops, becoming the first airship to be shot down by another aircraft.

== Development ==
According to a 1910 Italian "law for the strengthening of aeronautics", the construction of nine airships was ordered by the army, to consist of three small, five medium and one large aircraft. The medium-class semi-rigid airships (M type) were designed by the military engineers and officers Gaetano Crocco and Ottavio Ricaldoni. The first of the airships, M.1, powered by two 200 hp (150 kW) Fiat S-76A engines, was assigned to the Royal Army. In 1913 the Regia Marina (Royal Navy) also decided to equip itself with airships. The first of them, M.2, was built at the Vigna di Valle Air Base in Bracciano near Rome, according to specifications issued by naval technicians. Worried about having to encounter enemy aircraft during the envisioned missions over the Adriatic, they requested that the performance be improved. As a result the engines were changed, replacing them with four 125 hp (93 kW) Wolseley engines arranged in two pairs, each pair driving a single propeller. After the change, the maximum airspeed was increased to 82 km/h (51 mph), however, due to the increase in weight, the payload was reduced by about 300 kg (660 lb) to 3,000 kg (6,610 lb) and the maximum altitude dropped to less than 2,000 metres (6,560 ft).

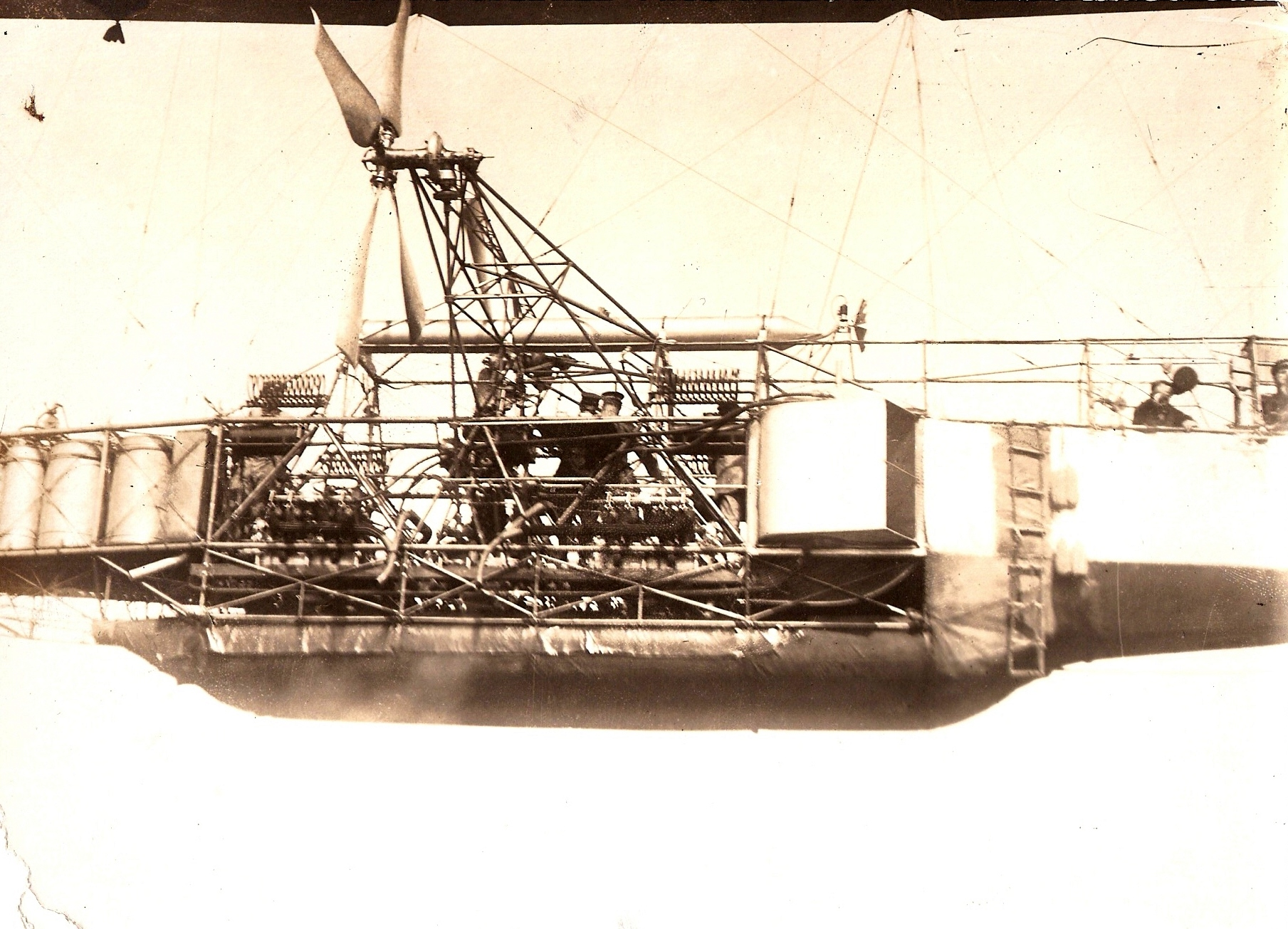
Gondola of M.2

The airship was completed on 26 May 1913, and took flight for the first time on 13 July, after receiving important modifications to the gondola. On 11 August the airship performed a test flight over Rome, with an aircraft dropping incendiary devices over the airship, while the latter tried to avoid the simulated attack by performing disengagement manoeuvres. On 26 August it made a two-hour test flight over Bracciano with the Minister of the Navy Enrico Millo on board. Once back in Vigna di Valle, the ship was then transferred to the Ferrara-San Luca Airport in the northern city of Ferrara on 27 August, carrying out a 380-kilometre (240 mi) flight in seven and a half hours under the command of Lieutenant Emanuele Ponzio and his crew: Lieutenant Giovanni Battista Carniglia, Sub-Lieutenant Giacinto Valerio and Chief Mechanic Antonio Mantero.

== Operational history ==
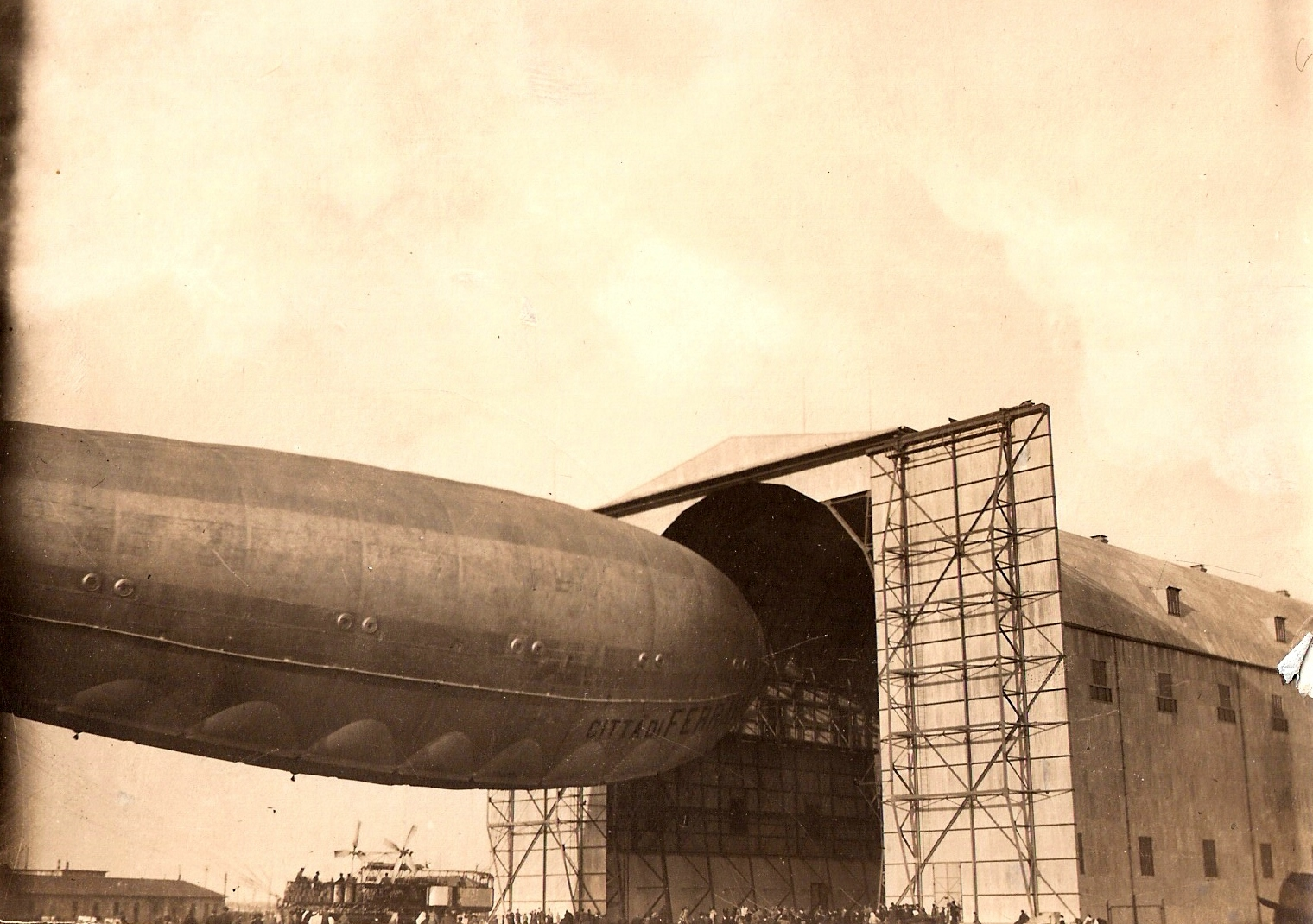
Hangaring the ship

During late 1913–1914 M.2 performed numerous test flights, including one on the route Ferrara–Ancona–Capo Gargano–Gulf of Manfredonia and return, covering 1,200 kilometres (750 mi) in 21 hours in the air without breaking down; this was a new Italian record for duration and distance without stopping. From 13 to 16 April 1914 M.2 took part in combined military manoeuvres with aircraft, airships and submarines over the sea between Venice and Ancona. In May 1914, during a special ceremony, the war flag, donated by a ladies' committee from the city of Ferrara, was delivered to the airship. Renamed M.2 Città di Ferrara (City of Ferrara), in May 1915 it was transferred to Jesi airfield in Jesi near the port city of Ancona on the Adriatic coast, under the command of Lieutenant Castruccio Castracane.

After the Kingdom of Italy entered World War I on 24 May, the airship was immediately used in operational missions as a part of coastal air patrols and subsequent bombing of Austro-Hungarian ships. Its first action was on the night of 23-24 May, when M.2 and the other navy airship, V.1 Città di Jesi, were tasked with carrying out an incursion on an enemy naval stronghold at Pula, across the Adriatic on the coast of what is now Croatia. M.2, which left at 23:20, quickly found itself in the middle of an operation of the Austro-Hungarian Navy against several targets along the Italian coast. At 00:28, under artillery fire from an enemy light cruiser, it abandoned the mission against Pula. While returning to home base, at 05:10 M.2 dropped some bombs on Australian-Hungarian naval units that had just carried out a bombardment of Ancona, the Porto Corsini Mare Est gas field and Senigallia damaging the Austrian destroyer SMS Velebit. Threatened by two enemy seaplanes, Castracane suspended the action and returned to Jesi airfield. On 30 May the airship took off from the Campalto airfield near Venice to bomb Pula. The raid was successful; M.2 managed to drop some bombs and also escape the anti-aircraft artillery fire, because, thanks to the clouds and darkness, the enemy searchlights were unable to illuminate it.

== Destruction ==
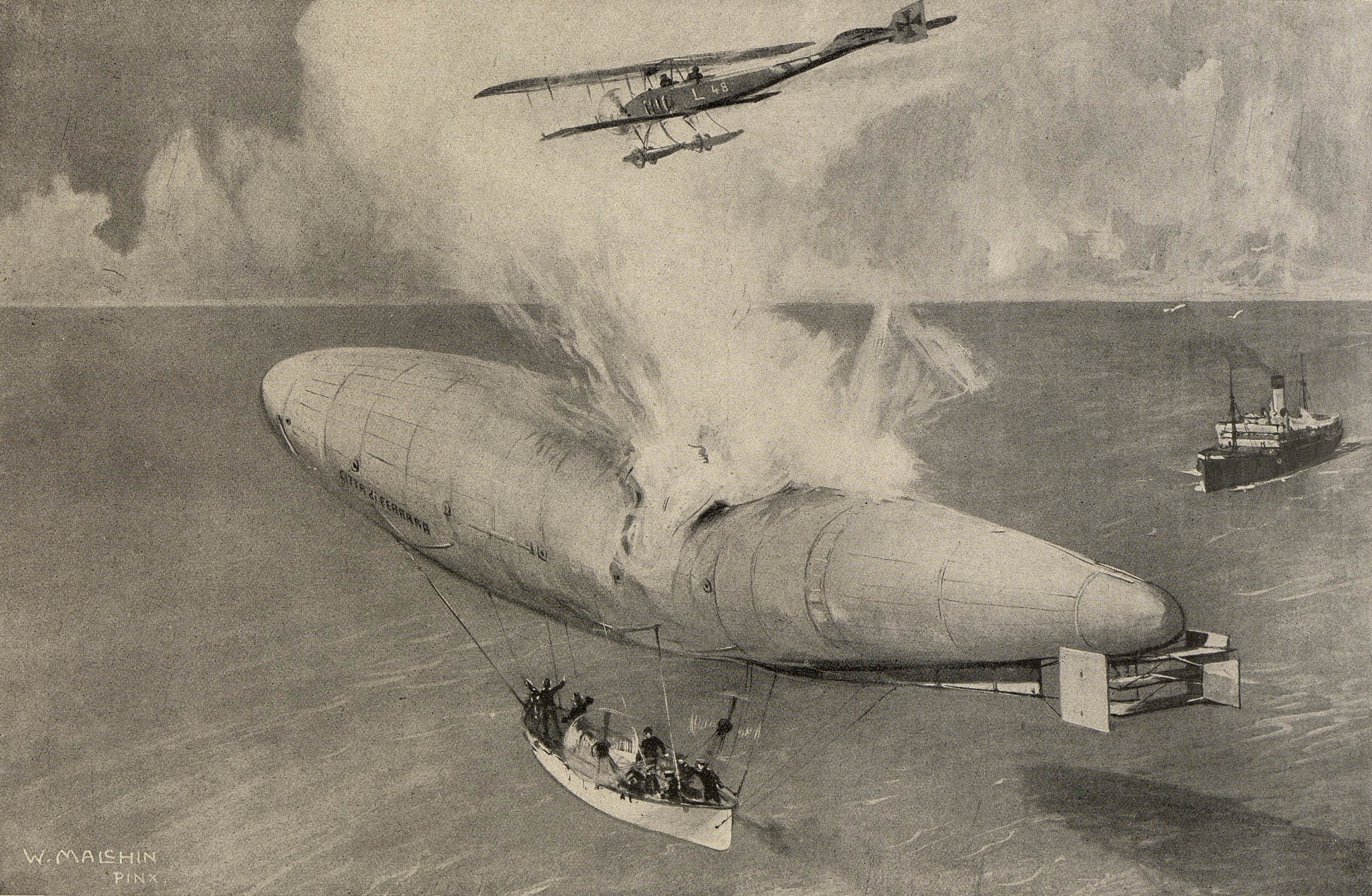
Airkill of the Italian Navy airship Citta de Ferrara by Austro-Hungarian waterplane L 48, 8 June 1915 (illustration by W. Malchin)

On 8 June 1915, upon returning from a bombing mission against the Whitehead torpedo factories and the Ganz & Co. Danubius shipyards in Fiume, the airship, under the command of Captain Castracane, was hit and seriously damaged. Città di Ferrara attempted to return to base, but approximately 20 kilometres (12 mi) from Premuda it was spotted by a patrolling Austro-Hungarian Lohner L piloted by Ship-of-the-line lieutenant Gustav Klasing with Schiesskommandant (artillerist) Hans Fritsche von Crouenwald as an observer. Klasing managed to get his seaplane closer to the airship and then the crew shot a flare at the airship’s envelope.

M.2 started to burn and fell into the sea; impact on the water or drowning caused the death of two crew members, while the survivors were picked up by an Austro-Hungarian torpedo boat and taken prisoner. Some wreckage of the ship was collected and taken to Fiume.

The shooting down of M.2 entered military aviation history as the first successful attack by an aircraft on an airship.

== Specifications ==
General characteristics

- Length: 83 m (272 ft 4 in)
- Diameter: 17 m (55 ft 9 in)
- Volume: 12,100 m^{3} (430,000 cu ft)

Performance

- Maximum speed: 82 km/h (51 mph, 44 kn)

== See also ==
- Gaetano Crocco
- Adriatic Campaign of World War I
- 1915 in aviation

== Bibliography ==
- Albrich, Thomas; Hagen, Nikolaus, eds. (2019). Österreich-Ungarns Fliegerasse im Ersten Weltkrieg 1914–1918 [Austro-Hungarian Flying Aces of the First World War 1914-1918] (in German). Innsbruck: Universitätsverlag Wagner. ISBN 978-3-7030-0997-6.
- Luigi Mancini, ed. (1936). Grande Enciclopedia Aeronautica (in Italian). Milan: Edizioni Aeronautica.
- Petrescu, R. V., Petrescu, F. I. (2013). The Aviation History: New Aircraft I - Color. Germany: Books on Demand.
- Giuseppe Pesce (1982). I dirigibili italiani [The Italian Airships] (in Italian). Modena: Mucchi Editore. ISBN 88-7000-056-7.
- War-chronicle. Germany: M. Berg. 1915. p. 41.
