= V.1 Città di Jesi =

Royal Italian Navy airship

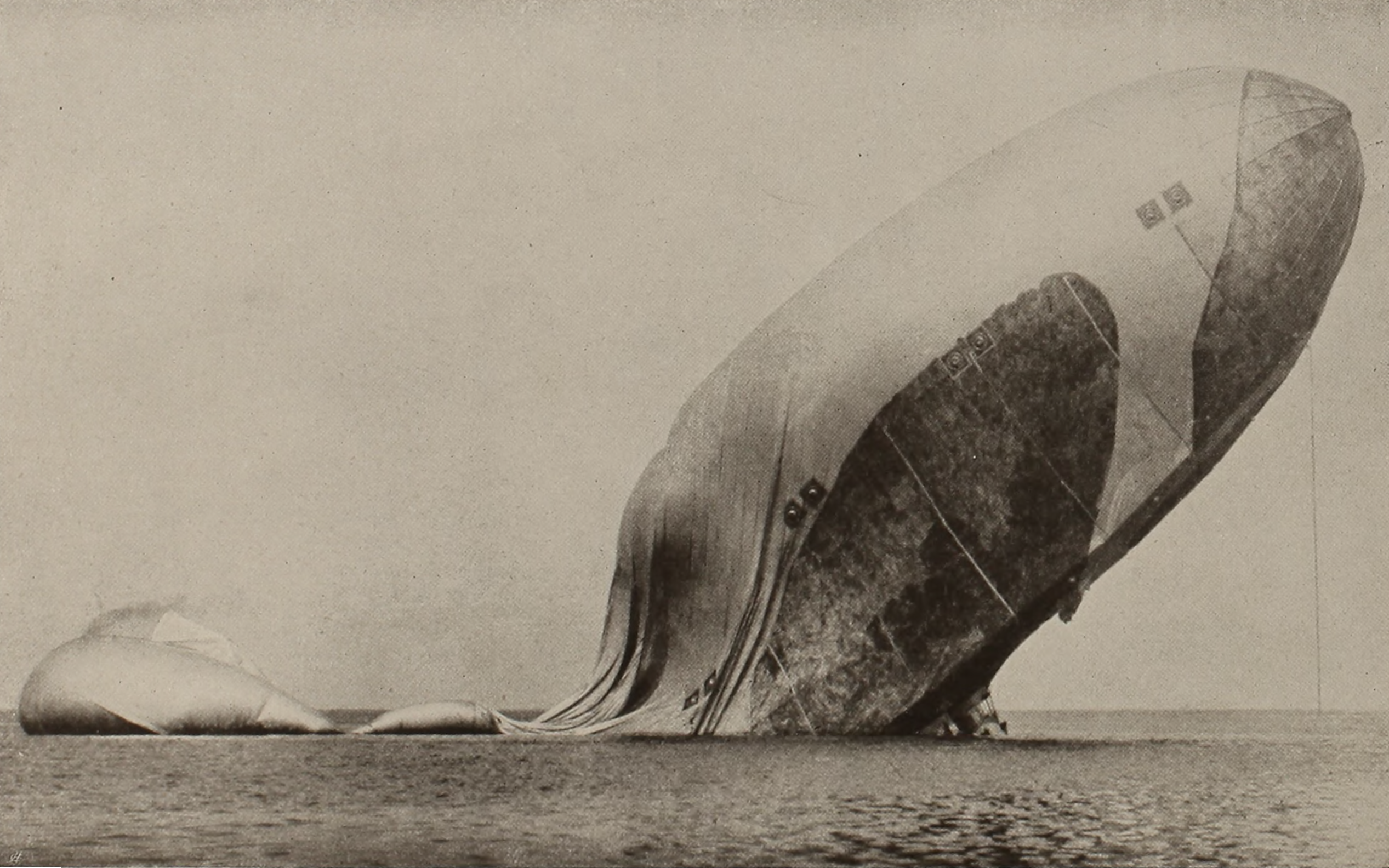
- Airship near Pula on 6 August 1915, the day after it was shot down

General information
- Type: Patrol airship
- National origin: Italy
- Manufacturer: Stabilimento Costruzioni Aeronautiche
- Designer: Rodolfo Verduzio
- Status: lost in action 5 August 1915
- Primary user: Regia Marina (Royal Italian Navy)
- Number built: 1

History
- Introduction date: 1915
- First flight: 1914

V.1 Città di Jesi was a semi-rigid military single-gondola airship made in 1914 by the Stabilimento Costruzioni Aeronautiche at the Vigna di Valle Air Base in Bracciano. It was designed by Rodolfo Verduzio as the first aircraft of the "V-Class" airships and operated by the Regia Marina (Royal Italian Navy). On 5 August 1915 it was destroyed by anti-aircraft artillery of the Austro-Hungarian Army during a bombing raid on Pula.

== Development ==
According to a 1910 Italian "law for the strengthening of aeronautics", the construction of nine airships was ordered by the army, to consist of three small, five medium and one large aircraft. V.1 was designed by Italian Royal Army engineer Rodolfo Verduzio, who had already participated in the designing of large M-class airships with Gaetano Crocco, built in 1913-1914. In October 1913, while the airship was still under construction, frigate captain Guido Scelsi, the head of the Royal Navy's aeronautical department, was appointed its commander with lieutenant Bruno Brivonesi as his first officer. The test trials, which started in 1914, took place first at the Vigna di Valle Air Base in Bracciano near Rome, and then at Ferrara-San Luca Airport in the northern city of Ferrara.

== Operational history ==
V.1 was put into service in 1915, shortly before the Kingdom of Italy entered World War I on 24 May. The airship was based at Jesi airfield in Jesi near the port city of Ancona on the Adriatic coast. While at Jesi it was renamed Città di Jesi (City of Jesi).

The airship was immediately used in operational missions as a part of coastal air patrols and subsequent bombing of Austro-Hungarian ships. Its first action was on the night of 23-24 May, when the V.1 Città di Jesi and the other navy airship, M.2 Città di Ferrara, were tasked with carrying out an incursion on an enemy naval stronghold at Pula, across the Adriatic on the coast of what is now Croatia. Because of problems with its engines overheating, V.1 was then taken off operations until late July. Bruno Brivonesi, the new commander of the airship, then urged for another bombing mission on Pula, following the example of the Italian airship P.4 successfully bombing the site twice.

=== Attack on Pula ===
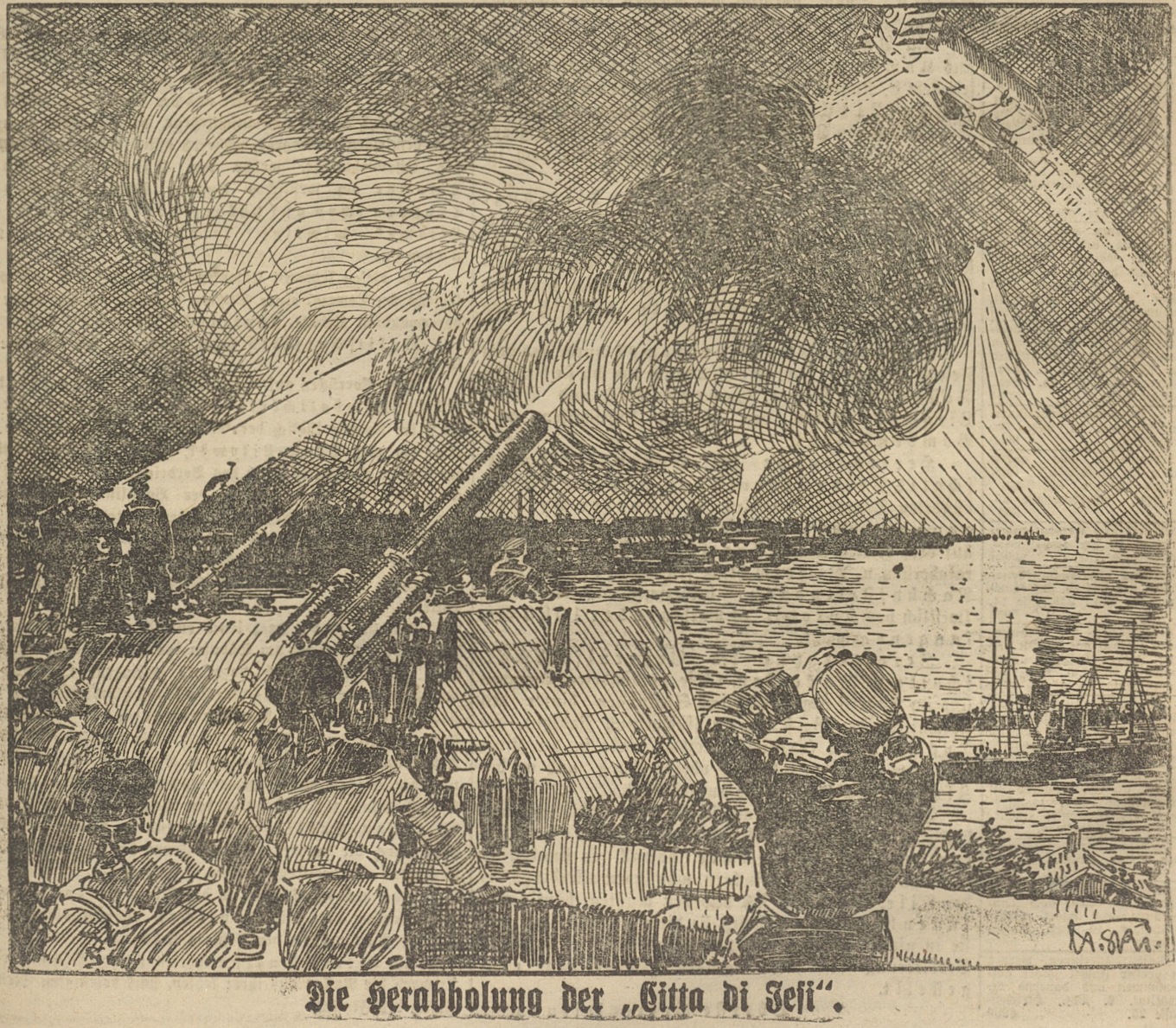
Depiction of the V.1 Pula bomb raid in Illustrierte Kronen Zeitung, 12 August 1915

Another raid on Pula by V.1 was ordered, to take place on the night of 4-5 August 1915, but a heavy storm delayed the attack for a day. V.1 finally took of on 5 August at 9 pm, carrying 600 kilograms (1,320 lb) of explosives. After almost three hours of flight the airship reached a point within a few kilometres of Pula shortly before midnight. Then it was spotted by Austro-Hungarian anti-aircraft guard crews, who illuminated it with searchlights on and started firing on it with artillery. Flying at an altitude of 2,700 metres (8,900 ft) the crew was blinded by the intense light and after an unsuccessful attempt to locate a target, jettisoned its bombs and started a turn to make its retreat. During the manoeuvre the ship's envelope was penetrated by a shell, and went out of control as gas vented from the hole. At first climbing to 3,000 metres (9,800 ft), it then started to rapidly descend. The crew threw overboard as much as they could to reduce weight, then sheltered inside metal framework within the ship, which finally hit the surface of the sea near the Istrian island of Veruda. While the nacelle and the back of the airship were destroyed during the impact, the forward envelope, still full of gas, remained raised high up from the water level.

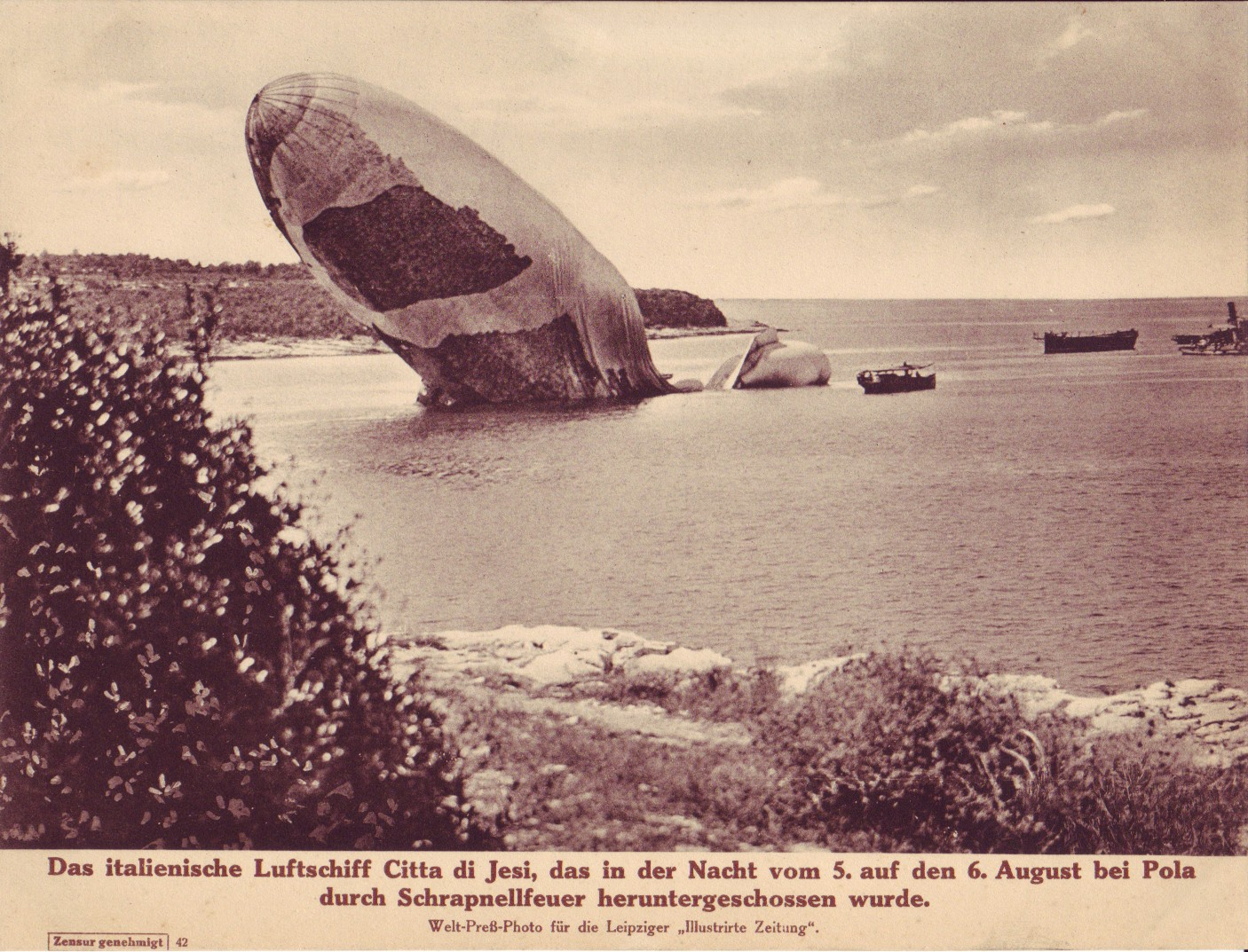
Crashed airship near Veruda on 6 August 1915

Captain Brivonesi and his men, including Raffaele de Courten, later Italian minister of navy, who survived the crash unharmed, then unsuccessfully attempted to sink the remaining parts of the ship, and were taken as prisoners of war by an Austro-Hungarian military vessel. The aviators were imprisoned in Mauthausen prisoner-of-war camp in Upper Austria and eventually repatriated for Austro-Hungarian POWs in May 1917.

== Specifications ==
General characteristics

- Length: 90 m (295 ft 3 in)
- Diameter: 19 m (62 ft 4 in)
- Volume: 14,650 m^{3} (517,000 cu ft)
- Powerplant: 4 × Maybach-Itala D.1

Performance

- Maximum speed: 90 km/h (56 mph, 49 kn)

== See also ==
- Adriatic Campaign of World War I
- 1915 in aviation

== Bibliography ==
- Sokol, Anthony (1968). The Imperial and Royal Austro-Hungarian Navy. Annapolis, MD: United States Naval Institute. OCLC 462208412.
- Favre, Franco. La Marina nella Grande Guerra. Le operazioni navali, aeree, subacquee e terrestri in Adriatico (in Italian).
- "Die Berabholung die Citta di Jesi". Illustrierte Kronen Zeitung (in German). 5609: 6. 12 August 1915.
- Pesce, Giuseppe (1982). I dirigibili italiani. Modena: Mucchi Editore.
