= Italian training ship Amerigo Vespucci =

Tall ship of the Italian Navy

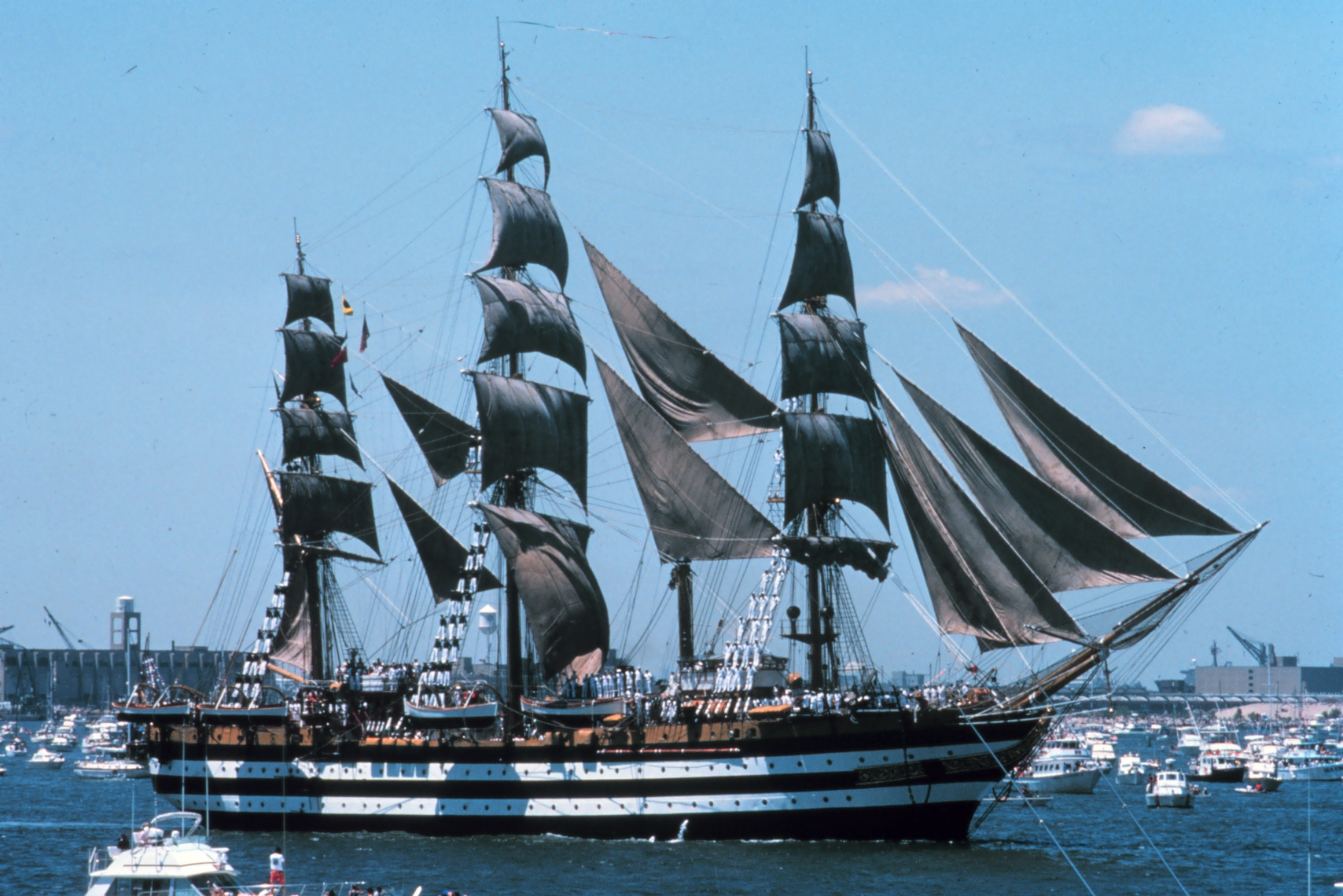
- Amerigo Vespucci in New York Harbor, 1976

History

Italy
- Name: Amerigo Vespucci
- Namesake: Amerigo Vespucci
- Builder: RC Cantiere di Castellammare di Stabia
- Laid down: 12 May 1930
- Launched: 22 February 1931
- Commissioned: 26 May 1931
- Identification: MMSI number: 247999000; Callsign: IABJ
- Motto: Italian: Non chi comincia ma quel che persevera; English: "Not he who begins but he who perseveres"
- Status: in active service

General characteristics
- Class & type: Cristoforo Colombo-class Sail training ship
- Tonnage: 3,410 GT; 1,203 NT
- Displacement: 4,146 t (4,081 long tons) full load
- Length: 100.5 m (329 ft 9 in) LOA including bowsprit; 82.4 m (270 ft) LPP
- Beam: 15.56 m (51.0 ft)
- Height: 54.0 m (177.2 ft)
- Draught: 7.3 m (24 ft)
- Propulsion: 26 sails, 2,635 m^{2} (28,360 sq ft); 2 × diesel engines generator MTU 12VM33F2, 1.360 kW (1.824 bhp) each; 2 × diesel engines generator MTU 8VM23F2, 760 kW (1,020 bhp) each; 1 × Electrical Propulsion Engine (MEP) ex Ansaldo Sistemi Industriali (NIDEC ASI) CR1000Y8 (2 × 750 kW (1,010 bhp))
- Speed: Sails, 15 knots (28 km/h); Engines, 11 knots (20 km/h)
- Complement: 15 officers; 64 NCOs (Non Commissioned Officers); 185 sailors; 130 Naval Academy Cadets and Support Staff (when embarked)
- Sensors & processing systems: 2 × navigation radars GEM Elettronica AN/SPN-753(V)5

Amerigo Vespucci at Amsterdam (1980)

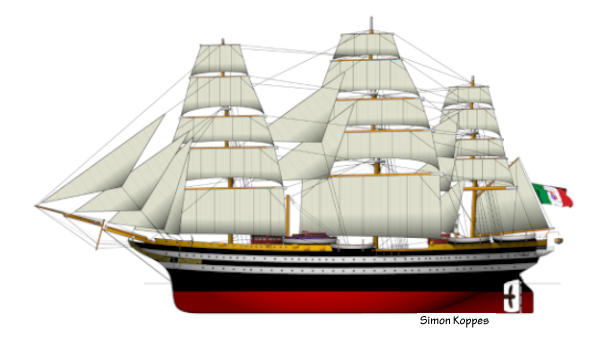
Line drawing Amerigo Vespucci

Amerigo Vespucci is a tall ship of the Italian Navy (Marina Militare), named after the explorer Amerigo Vespucci. Her home port is La Spezia, Italy, and she is curently in use as a training ship.

== History ==
In 1925, the Regia Marina ordered two training ships to a design by General Lieutenant Francesco Rotundi of the Italian Navy Engineering Corps, inspired by the style of large late 18th century 74-cannon ships of the line (like the Neapolitan ship Monarca). The first, the Cristoforo Colombo, was put into service in 1928 and was used by the Italian Navy until 1943. After World War II, this ship was handed over to the USSR as part of the war reparations and was shortly afterwards decommissioned.

The second ship was the Amerigo Vespucci, built in 1930 at the (formerly Royal) Naval Shipyard of Castellammare di Stabia (Naples). She was launched on 22 February 1931, and put into service in July of that year.

The vessel is a full-rigged three-masted steel hull 82.4 m (270 ft) long, with an overall length of 101 m (331 ft) including the bowsprit and a maximum width of 15.5 m (51 ft). She has a draught of about 7 m (23 ft) and a displacement at full load of 4146 tons. Under auxiliary diesel-electric propulsion the Amerigo Vespucci can reach 10 knots (12 mph; 19 km/h) and has a range of 5,450 nautical miles (6,270 mi; 10,090 km) at 6.5 knots (7.5 mph; 12.0 km/h)

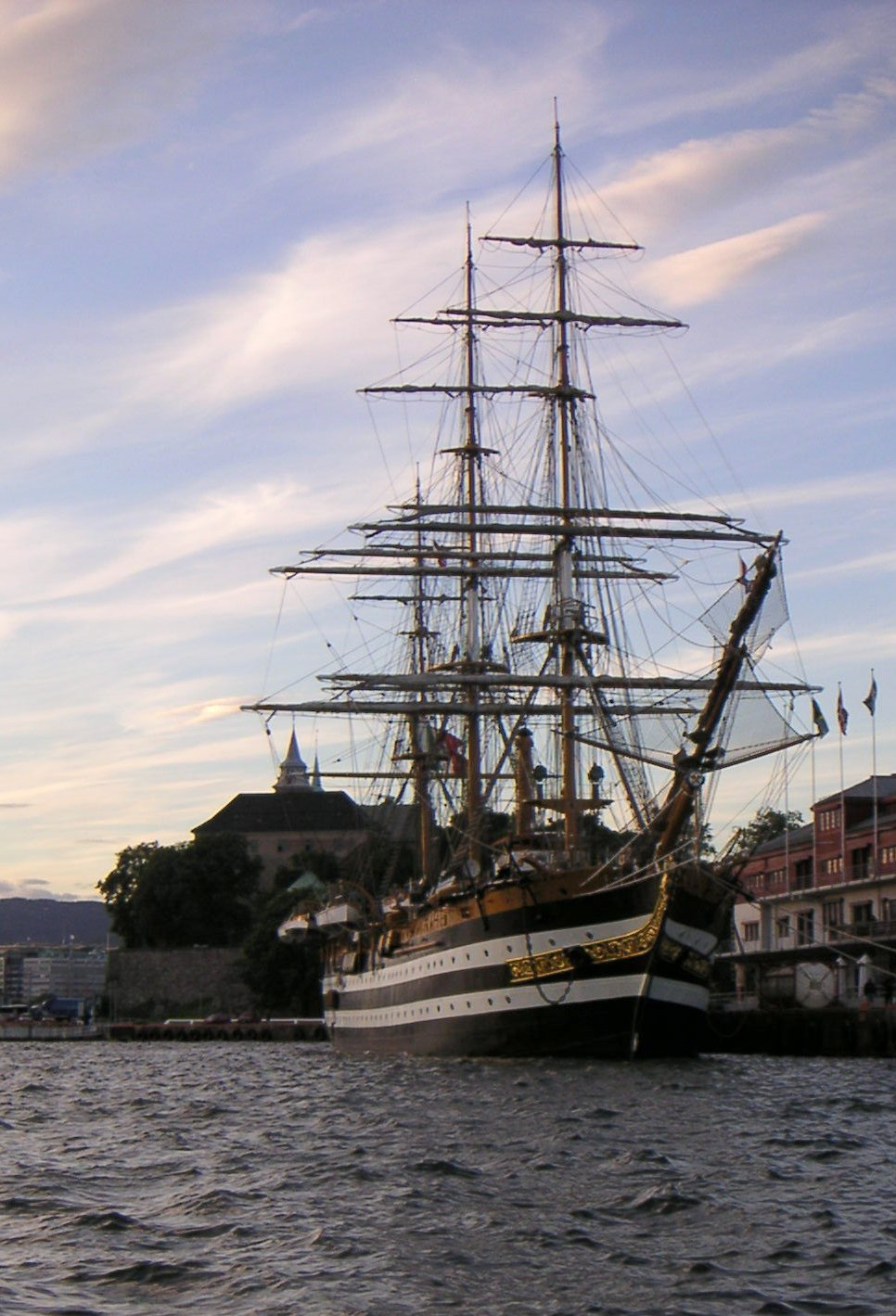
The Amerigo Vespucci in the harbor of Oslo, 2005. Akershus Fortress in the background.

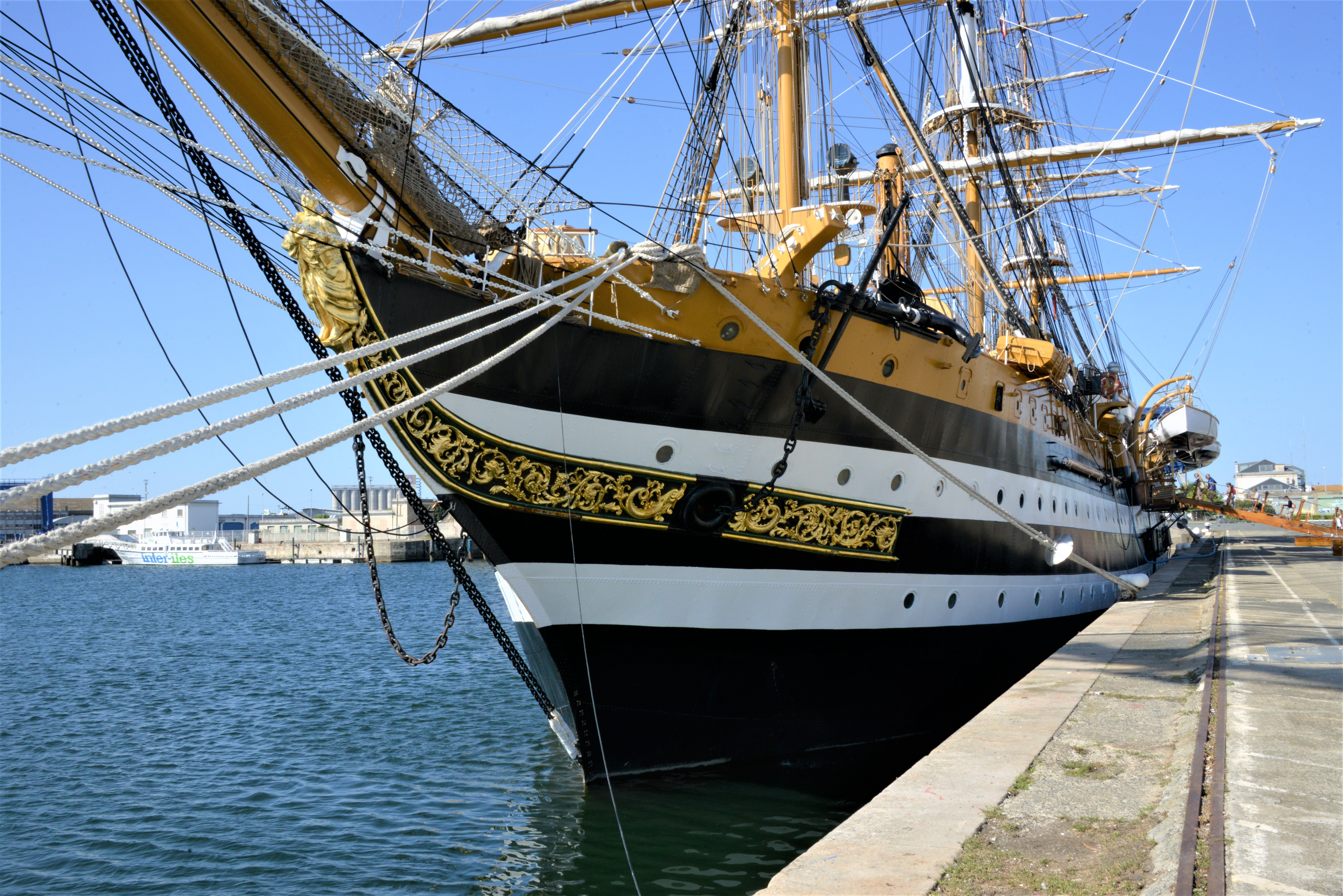
The Amerigo Vespucci, after the modernization works, in the harbor of La Rochelle, 2018.

The three steel masts are 50 metres (160 ft), 54 metres (177 ft), and 43 metres (141 ft) high, and carry sails totaling 2,824 m^{2} (30,400 sq ft). The Amerigo Vespucci has 26 sails – square sails, staysails, and jibs: all are traditional canvas sails. When under sail in severe sea and wind conditions she can reach 12 knots (14 mph; 22 km/h). The rig, some 30 kilometres (19 mi) of ropes, uses only traditional hemp ropes; only the mooring lines are synthetic, to comply with port regulations.

The hull is painted black with two white stripes, harking back to the two gun decks of the ships her design is based on, but she carries only two 6-pdr saluting guns in pivot mountings on the deck, forward of the mainmast. The deck planks are of teak wood and must be replaced every three years. Bow and stern are decorated with intricate ornaments; she has a life-size figurehead of Amerigo Vespucci. The stern gallery is accessible only through the captain's saloon.

The standard crew of the Amerigo Vespucci is 16 officers, 70 non-commissioned officers and 190 sailors. In summer, when she embarks the midshipmen of the Naval Academy (Accademia Navale), the crew totals some 450.

In 1964, the ship was fitted with two 4-stroke, 8-cylinder FIAT B 308 ESS diesel engines, which replaced the original 2-stroke 6-cylinder FIAT Q 426 engines. These engines generated electric power for one electric propulsion motor that produced up to about 1,471 kW (1,973 hp).

After update works, between 2013 and 2016, the ship has been fitted with two 4-stroke, 12-cylinder MTU, 1,32 MW each diesel engine generators and two 4-stroke, 8-cylinder MTU, 760-kilowatt (1,020 hp) each diesel engine generators, and one NIDEC (Ansaldo Sistemi Industriali) electric engine. During the same work, the ship was fitted with new radar GEM Elettronica AN/SPS-753(V)5, new satellite antenna ORBIT AL-7103.

When carrying cadets, the ship is usually steered from the manual stern rudder station, which is operated by four steering wheels with two men each. At other times, the hydraulically assisted steering on the bridge is used. Except for the anchor winch, the winches aboard are not power operated. The bridge is equipped with modern electronic navigation instruments.

Other than during World War II, the Amerigo Vespucci has been continually active. Most of her training cruises are in European waters, but she has also sailed to North and South America, and navigated the Pacific. In 2002, she undertook a voyage around the world.

In 1960, Vespucci carried the Olympic torch from Piraeus to Syracuse for the Summer Olympics in Rome.

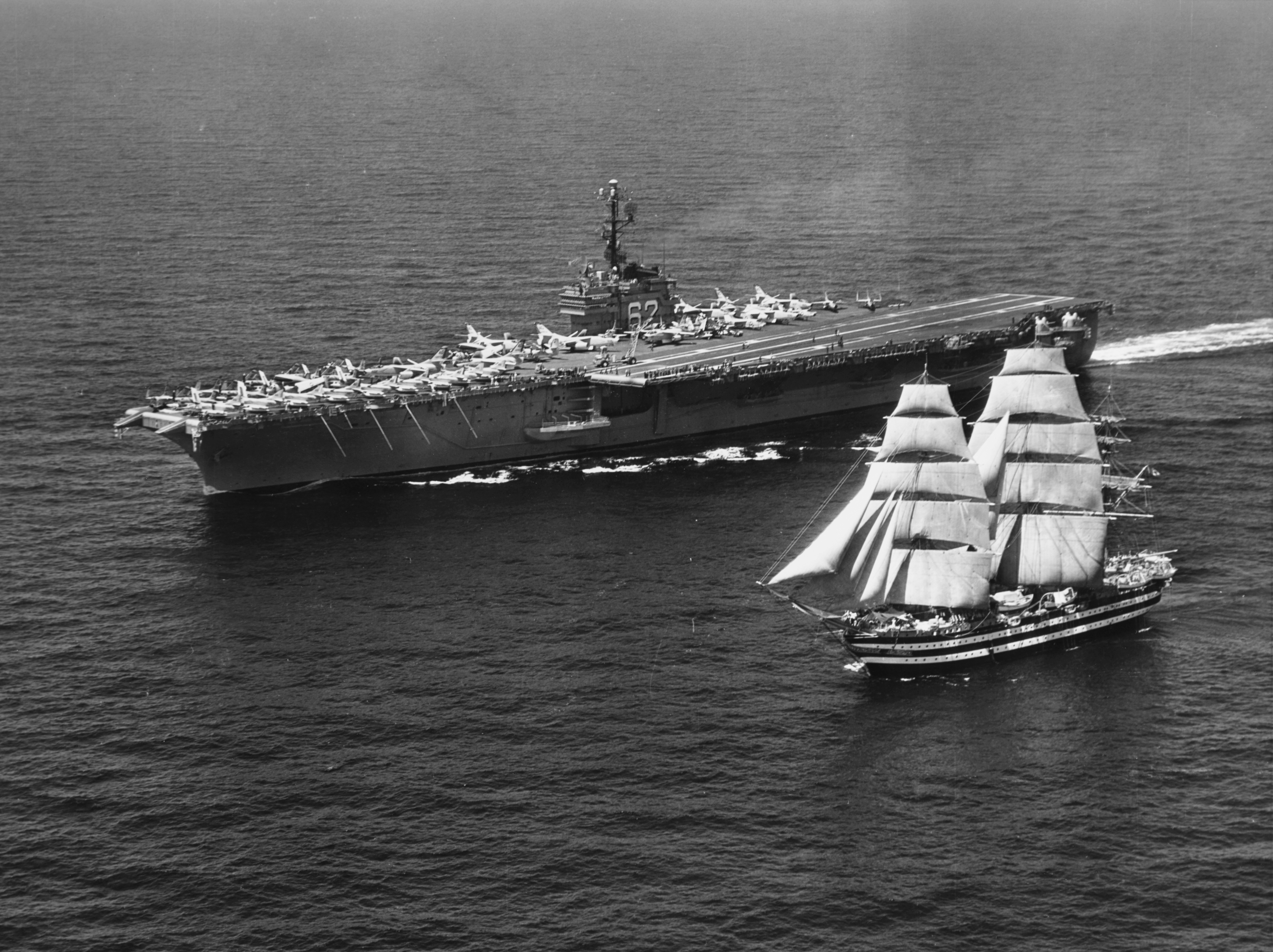
USS Independence (CVA-62) underway with sailing ship Amerigo Vespucci in the Mediterranean Sea, 12 July 1962.

While sailing the Mediterranean Sea in 1962, the American aircraft carrier USS Independence flashed the Amerigo Vespucci with the light signal asking: "Who are you?" The full-rigged ship answered: "Training ship Amerigo Vespucci, Italian Navy." The Independence replied: "You are the most beautiful ship in the world." In 2022, the Amerigo Vespucci sailed by the American aircraft carrier USS George H.W. Bush, which saluted the ship and commented: "You are still, after 60 years, the most beautiful ship in the world."

The Amerigo Vespucci often takes part in sailing parades and Tall Ships' Races, where she is in amicable rivalry with the Gorch Fock. When she is berthed in port, public tours of the vessel are usually offered. The ship circumnavigated the globe in 2003. Starting from 2013, the Vespucci depends directly on the Commander in Chief Naval Fleet.

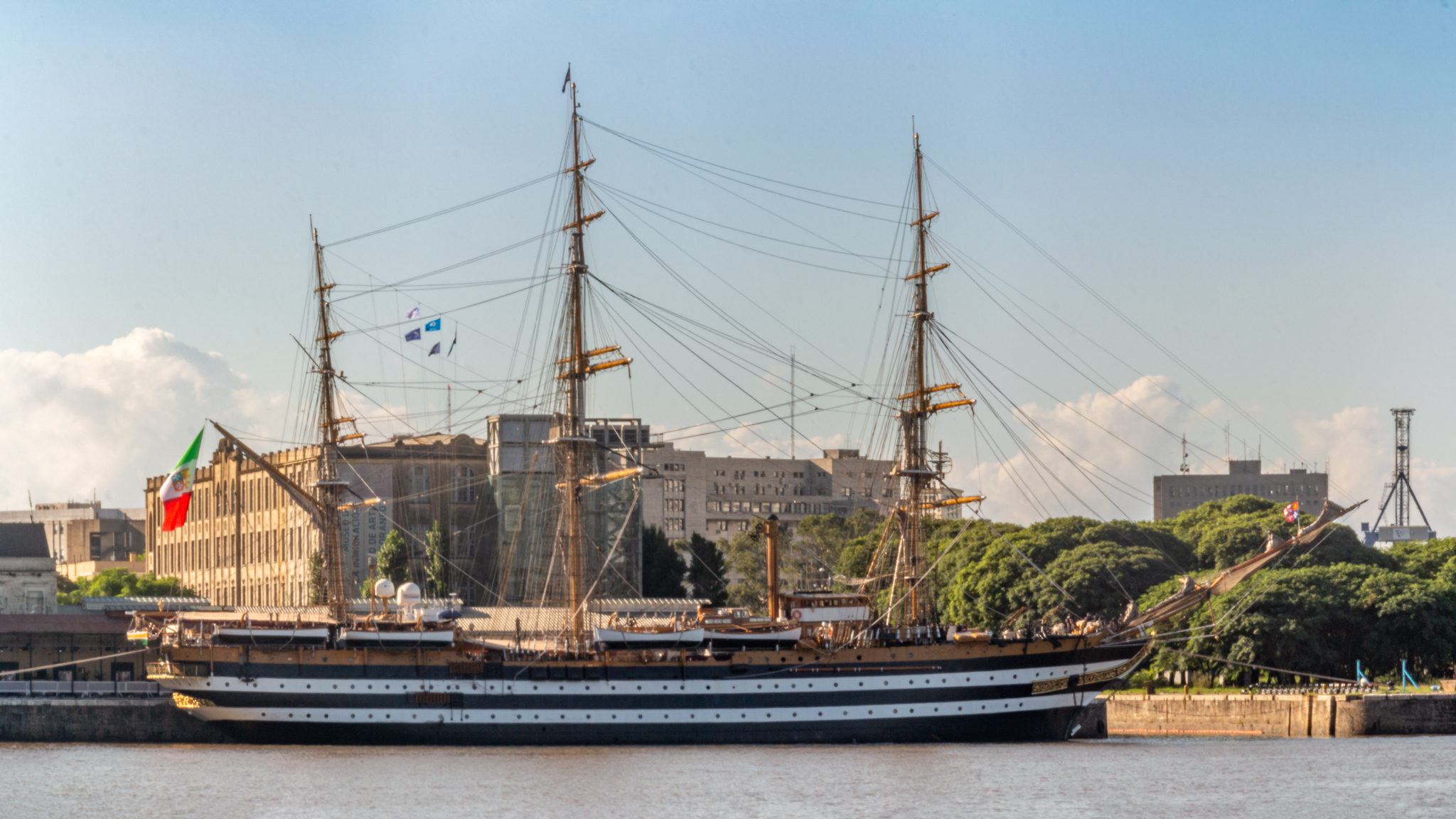
The Amerigo Vespucci on her visit to Argentina, March 2024.

The ship was modernized between 2013 and 2016.

On 22 November 2024, Amerigo Vespucci conducted a joint sailing exercise with the INS Tarangini of the Indian Navy off the coast of Kochi, India. On 30 November 2024, the ship docked at Mumbai for a five-day stopover as a part of its circumnavigation that started in 2023 and included 36 ports and 32 countries; Mumbai marked its 27th stop. The ship's crew, including 270 crew 150 cadets for seamanship training, sailed for 16 days across the Indian Ocean from Phuket to Mumbai.

On 9 January 2025, archbishop Santo Marcianò of the Military Ordinariate of Italy designated the ship as a 2025 Jubilee church and site “for sacred pilgrimages and for pious visits among its missions at sea.”

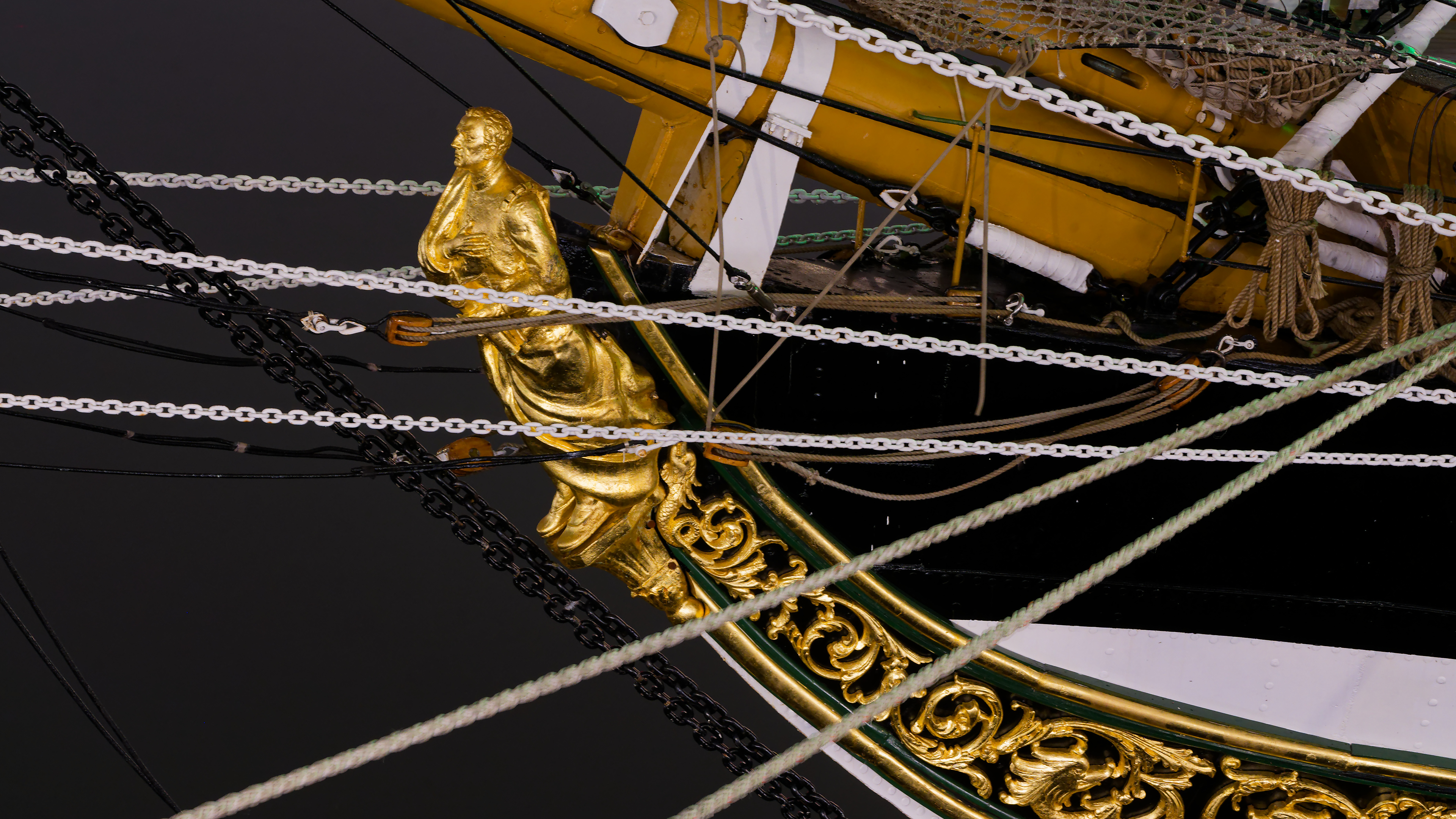
Figurehead

== Tender ==
In April 2015 tender NC90 was replaced by the following:

- shipyard: Cantiere Nautico Tagliapietra, Venice
- displacement: 6 t (5.9 long tons)
- length: 10 m (32 ft 10 in)
- beam: 2.6 m (8 ft 6 in)
- propulsion: 2 x FPT S30 170 hp (130 kW) each
- speed: 16 knots (30 km/h)
- range: 180 nmi (330 km; 210 mi)

== See also ==
- List of large sailing vessels
- ARM Cuauhtémoc – the tall ship that crashed into Brooklyn Bridge
