= Bombardment of Ancona =

Naval engagement of the Adriatic Campaign of World War I

Coordinates: 43°41′9″N 13°33′9″E

- Part of World War I
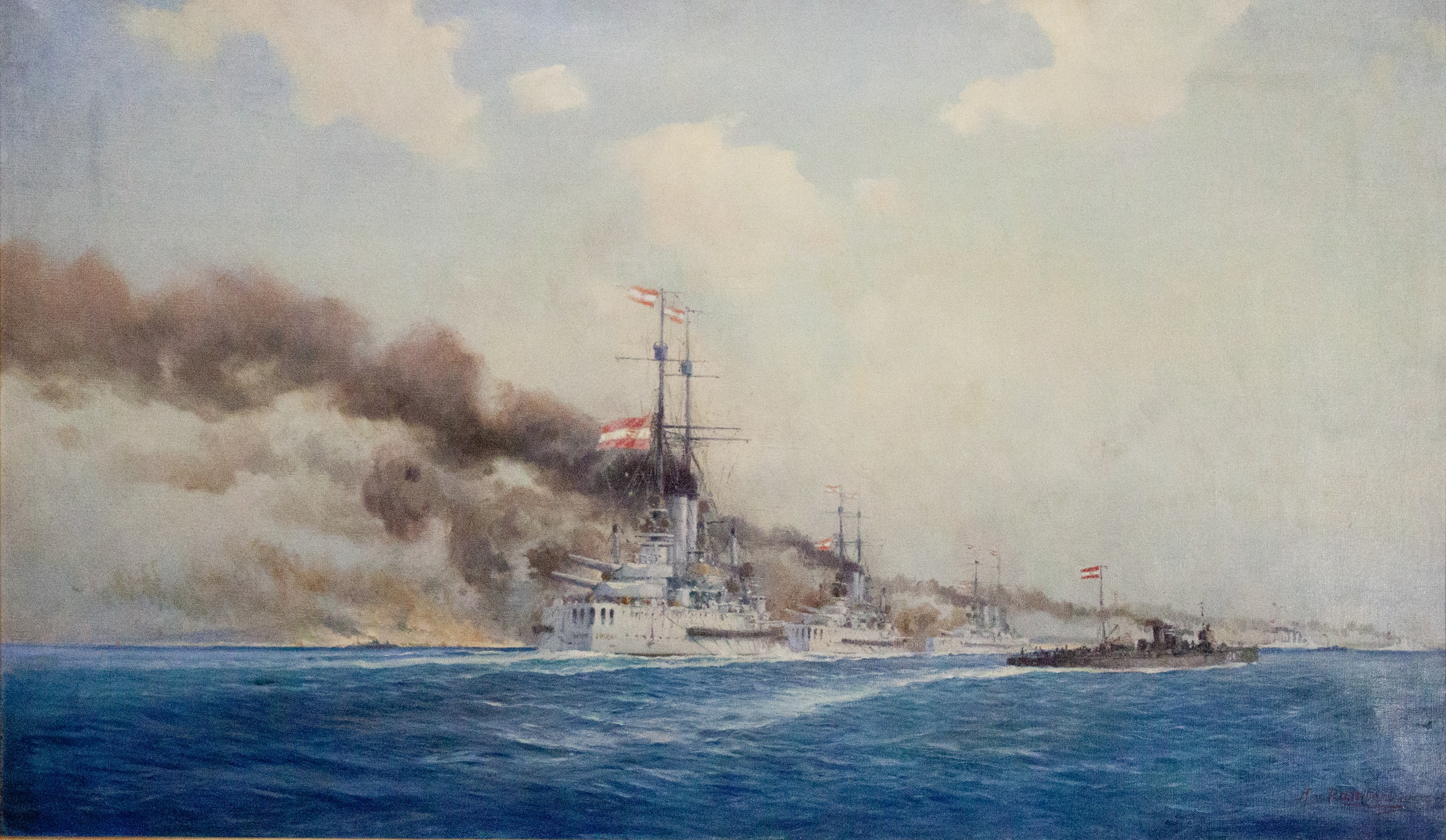
- Bombarding of Ancona by August von Ramberg
Date	23–24 May 1915
Location	Ancona, Adriatic Sea
Result	Austro-Hungarian victory

Belligerents
Austria-Hungary	Italy

Strength
3 dreadnought battleships 8 pre-dreadnought battleships 2 scout cruisers 9+ destroyers 8+ torpedo boats	1 armed merchant cruiser 1 protected cruiser 1 destroyer 2 airships 1 flying boat

Casualties and losses
1 scout cruiser damaged Unknown killed	63 killed 1 destroyer sunk 1 airship damaged

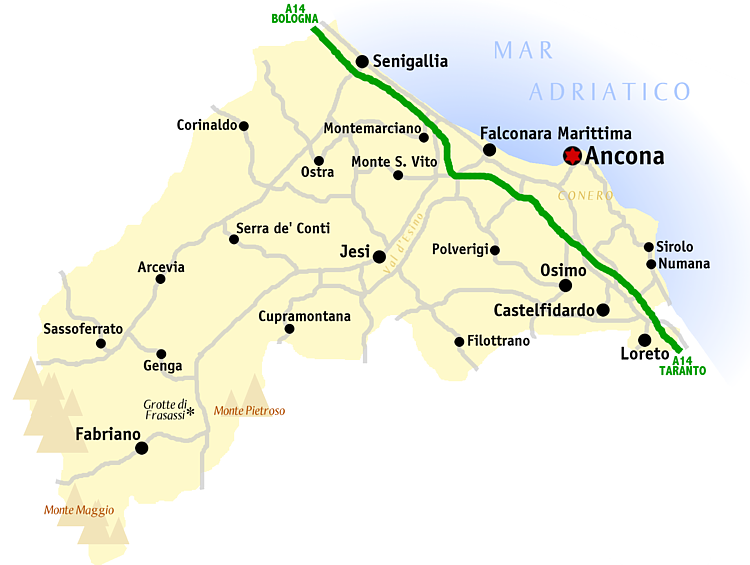
Map of the province of Ancona.

The Bombardment of Ancona was a naval engagement of the Adriatic Campaign of World War I between the navies of Italy and Austria-Hungary. Forces of the Imperial and Royal Navy attacked and bombarded military and civilian targets all across Ancona in central Italy and several other nearby islands and communities in response to Italy's declaration of war on Austria-Hungary.

== Prelude ==
When Italy declared war against Austria-Hungary on 23 May 1915, the Austrian fleet was quick to react; the navy launched several attacks on the Marche region of Italy. That day, the destroyer SMS Dinara and torpedo boat Tb 53T bombarded the port of Ancona. The destroyer SMS Lika, on a reconnaissance mission between Palagruža and Cape Gargano, shelled the semaphore and radio station at Vieste. Defending those waters at the time was the Italian destroyer Turbine. A small duel commenced with Lika coming out as the victor, damaging the enemy destroyer.

== Raid ==
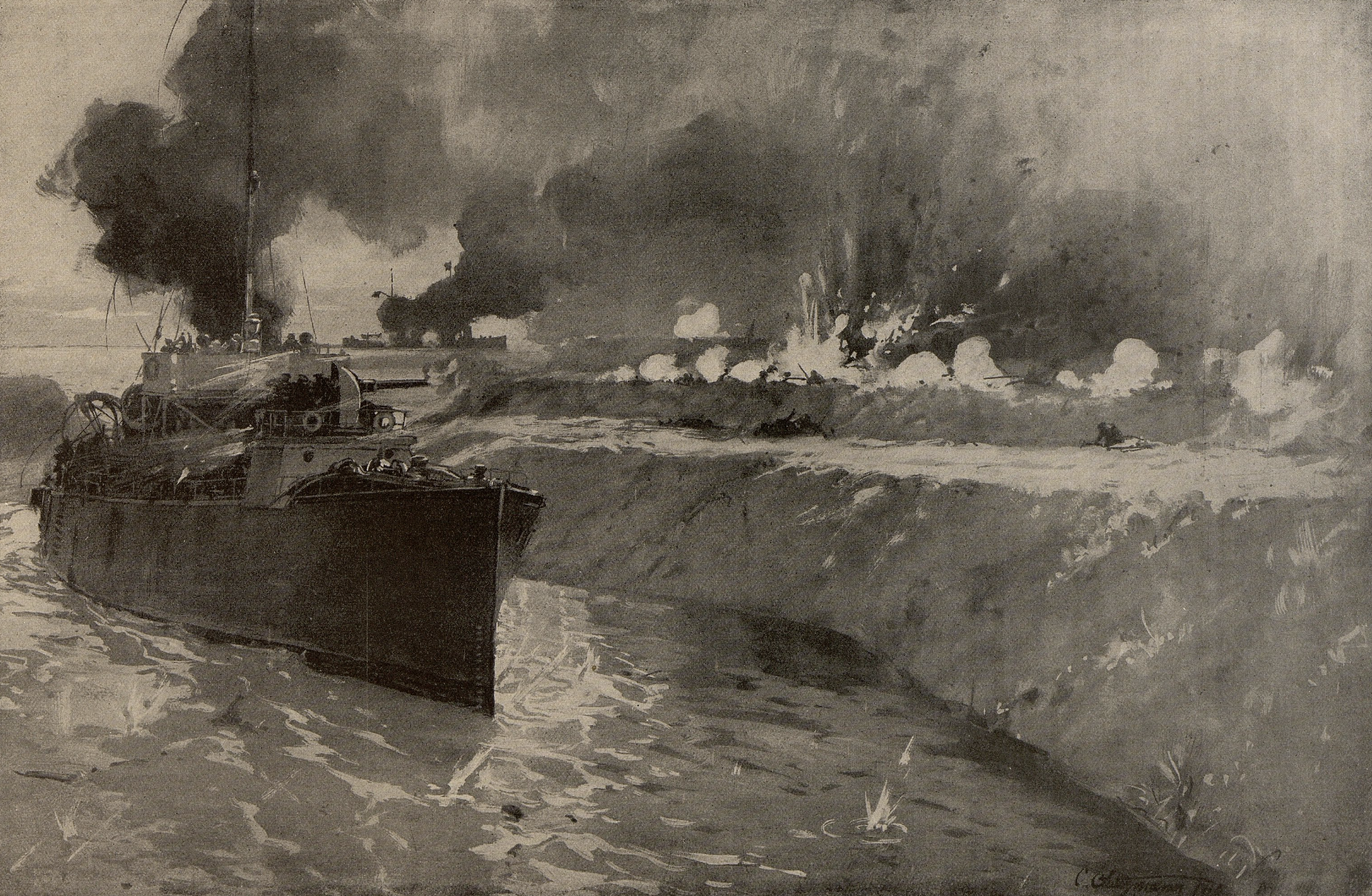
Advance of the Austro-Hungarian torpedo destroyer “Scharfschütze” into the Corssini Canal on May 24 1915 (German illustration)

The next day, 24 May, the majority of the Austrian fleet at Pola steamed for the Adriatic coast of Italy. This included the dreadnoughts SMS Viribus Unitis, Tegetthoff, Prinz Eugen and eight pre-dreadnoughts. Other Austro-Hungarian ships were already in enemy waters or proceeding to the Ancona coast themselves. The fleet bombarded several of the Italian coastal cities and other targets in and around the Province of Ancona, especially damaging the city of Ancona.

SMS Tegetthoff and the destroyer SMS Velebit shelled the Italian airship Città di Ferrara off Ancona. The pre-dreadnought SMS Radetzky and two torpedo boats bombarded Potenza Picena, then returned to Pola naval base. The pre-dreadnought SMS Zrínyi—along with two more torpedo boats—bombarded Senigallia, destroying a train and damaging a railway station and a bridge, before returning to Pola. The torpedo boat SMS Tb 3 was unsuccessfully bombed by an Italian flying boat.

Austrian scout cruiser SMS Admiral Spaun bombarded the Italian signal station at Cretaccio Island, while SMS Sankt Georg—with two torpedo boats—shelled Rimini, damaging a freight train. The destroyer SMS Streiter attacked the signal station near Torre di Mileto. The light cruiser SMS Novara, a destroyer and two torpedo boats entered Corsini Channel and shelled an Italian torpedo boat station, another semaphore station, and few batteries of coastal artillery.

The scout cruiser SMS Helgoland—supported by four destroyers—ran into the Italian destroyer Turbine, in a pitched battle south of Pelagosa. The destroyer SMS Tátra shelled the railway embankment near Manfredonia while the destroyer SMS Csepel shelled the Manfredonia railway station. Finally Austro-Hungarian flying boats dropped ordnance on Venice and seaplane hangars at Chiaravalle.¨

The Italian protected cruiser Libia briefly saw combat during the latter stage of the raid on the morning of 24 May; she and the armed merchant cruiser SS Cittá di Siracusa engaged the Austro-Hungarian scout cruiser SMS Helgoland as she and the destroyers Tátra and Csepel were withdrawing from the area. The ships exchanged gunfire between 07:10 and 07:19, and Libia struck Helgoland with one shell before the faster Austro-Hungarians were able to disengage from the slower Italian ships.

== Aftermath ==
Heavy damage was inflicted by the Austrian navy, and 63 people, both Italian military and civilian personnel, died in Ancona alone. The dome of Ancona Cathedral was damaged, too. Austrian casualties were light. The war in the Adriatic Sea continued, culminating in a large Allied blockade to prevent the Austro-Hungarian fleet from leaving the Adriatic. The "Otranto Barrage" would be raided by the Austro-Hungarians several times throughout the war, but major Austro-Hungarian warships rarely left the bases after this raid.

== Bibliography ==
- Gardiner, Robert, ed. (1985). Conway's All the World's Fighting Ships 1906–1921. Annapolis, Maryland: Naval Institute Press. ISBN 978-0-87021-907-8. OCLC 12119866.
- Tarrant, V. E. (1989). The U-Boat Offensive: 1914–1945. Annapolis, Maryland: Naval Institute Press. ISBN 978-0-87021-764-7. OCLC 20338385.
- Baumgartner, Lothar; Erwin Sieche (1999). Die Schiffe der k.(u.)k. Kriegsmarine im Bild=Austro-Hungarian warships in photographs (in German). Wien: Verlagsbuchhandlung Stöhr. ISBN 978-3-901208-25-6. OCLC 43596931.
- Sakmyster, Thomas L. (1994). Hungary's Admiral on Horseback. Boulder, CO: East European Monographs. ISBN 0-88033-293-X.
- Montgomery, John Flournoy (1947). The Unwilling Satellite. New York: The Devin-Adair Company. ISBN 1-931313-57-1.
- Rutter, Owen (1938). Regent of Hungary: The Authorized Life of Admiral Nicholas Horthy. London: Rich and Cowan.
