= Porto Corsini Mare Est gas field =

On the continental shelf of the Adriatic Sea

Porto Corsini Mare Est
- Country: Italy
- Region: Adriatic Sea
- Offshore/onshore: offshore
- Operator: Eni

Field history
- Discovery: 1971
- Start of development: 1971
- Start of production: 1975

Production
- Current production of gas: 5×10^{6} m^{3}/d 161×10^{6} cu ft/d 1.78×10^{9} m^{3}/a (63×10^{9} cu ft/a)
- Estimated oil in place: 4 million barrels (~5.5×10^{5} t)
- Estimated gas in place: 50×10^{9} m^{3} 1.75×10^{12} cu ft

The Porto Corsini Mare Est gas field is a natural gas field located on the continental shelf of the Adriatic Sea. It was discovered in 1971 and developed by Eni. It began production in 1975 and produces natural gas and condensates. The total proven reserves of the Porto Corsini Mare Est gas field are around 1750 billion cubic feet (50 billion m³), and production is slated to be around 161 million cubic feet/day (5×10^{5}m³) in 2010.
