= Soviet training ship Dunay =

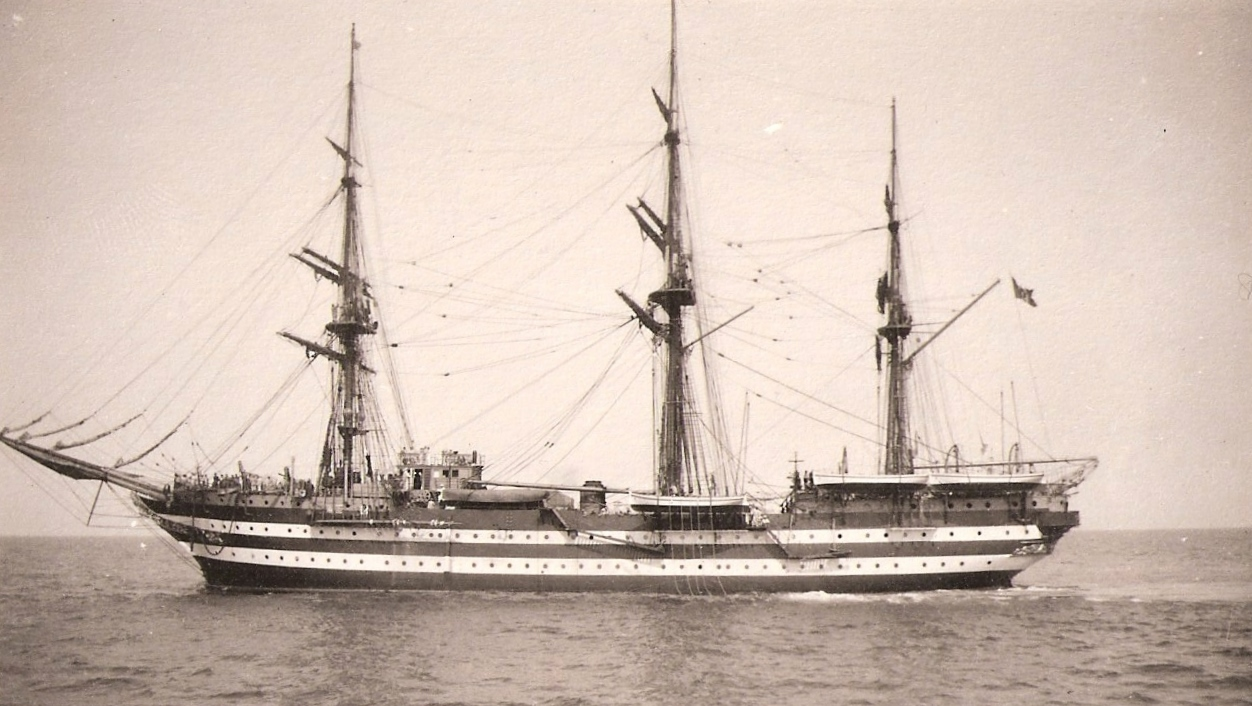
- Cristoforo Colombo in Italian service

History

Italy
- Name: Cristoforo Colombo
- Namesake: Christopher Columbus
- Builder: R C di Castellammare di Stabia
- Laid down: 15 April 1926
- Launched: 4 April 1928
- Commissioned: 1 July 1928
- Fate: Ceded to the Soviet Union as war reparation, March 1949
- Name: Dunay
- Acquired: 1949
- Stricken: 1959
- Fate: Destroyed by fire in 1963

General characteristics
- Class & type: Cristoforo Columbus-class Sail training ship
- Displacement: 4.146 t (4 long tons) standard
- Length: 100.5 m (329 ft 9 in)
- Beam: 15.5 m (50 ft 10 in)
- Draught: 7 m (23 ft 0 in)
- Propulsion: sail
- Speed: 10 knots
- Complement: 400

Dunay was a tall ship of the Soviet Navy, previously operated by Italy as Cristoforo Colombo. It was laid down at the Castellammare yards on 15 April 1926, and destroyed in a fire in 1963.

== History ==
In 1925, the Regia Marina (Italian Royal Navy) ordered two school ships to a design by General Lieutenant Francesco Rotundi of the Italian Navy Engineering Corps, inspired by the style of large late 18th century 74-gun ships of the line. The first, Cristoforo Colombo, was put into service in 1928 and was used by the Regia Marina until 1943. After World War II, the ship was handed over to the Soviet Union as part of the war reparations demanded by the 1947 Paris Peace Treaty, and was decommissioned in 1959.

The second ship was Amerigo Vespucci, launched in 1931 and still in service.

== See also ==
- List of ships of the Soviet Navy
- List of ships of Russia by project number
