= Dulab Castle =

Castle in Hormozgan Province, Iran

- قلعه دولاب

General information
- Type: Castle
- Location: Bastak County, Iran

Dulab Castle (Persian: قلعه دولاب) is a historical castle located in Bastak County in Hormozgan Province, The longevity of this fortress dates back to the Sasanian Empire.
