= Parvizeh Evaz Castle =

Castle in Fars province, Iran

Parvizeh Evaz castle
- قلعه پرویزه اوز

General information
- Type: Castle
- Location: Evaz County, Iran

Parvizeh Evaz castle (Persian: قلعه پرویزه اوز) is a historical castle located in Evaz County in Fars province, The longevity of this fortress dates back to the Sasanian Empire.
