= Eshgaft-e Moneh Castle =

Castle in Hormozgan Province, Iran

Eshgaft-e Moneh castle
- قلعه اشگفت منه

General information
- Type: Castle
- Location: Bastak County, Iran

Eshgaft-e Moneh castle (Persian: قلعه اشگفت منه) is a historical castle located in Bastak County in Hormozgan Province, The longevity of this fortress dates back to the Sasanian Empire.
