= Great Hagi Jaffar Dam =

Dam in Hormozgan, Iran

- Location within Iran
- Official name: سد حاجي جعفر الكبير
- Location: Kukherd, Hormozgan Province, Iran
- Coordinates: 27°02′24.75″N 54°29′20.13″E

Dam and spillways
- Impounds: Awe Sherino Valley

Great Hagi Jaffar Dam (from Arabic: سد حاجي جعفر الكبير, in Persian: سد حاجی جعفر گّب), is a dam in Kukherd city, southwestern Kukherd District, Hormozgan Province, Iran.

== Geology ==
Awe Sherino Valley basin is located in the southern part of Zeer Mountain and southern Bust Gez Mountain is a beg Mount from Kukherd District (Persian: بخش كوخرد) in the city of Bastak (Bastak County شهرستان بستک) Hormozgan Province.

== See also ==
- Boz Dam
- Paraw Kukherd
- The Historic Bath of Siba
- Castle of Siba
- Sassanid family tree — of the Sasanian (Sassanid) dynasty
