= Tawseelah Castle =

Castle of Tawseelah Kukherd قلعه توصیله كوخرد
- Archaeological site
- Country: Iran
- Province: Hormozgan
- County: Bastak
- Bakhsh: Kukherd
- Time zone: UTC+3:30 (IRST)
  - Summer (DST): UTC+4:30 (IRDT)

The Castle of Tawseelah (from Arabic: قلعة توصيلة, (Persian: قلعه توصیله), Aamaj castle is a fortified structure surrounded by trenches in North Kukherd Rural District in Kukherd District, Hormozgan Province in south Iran.

== Location ==
Tawseelah castle was a squared fortified structure situated 1000 away from Kukherd city and located on an average hill above the palm oasis in the Shamo valley in the Durakhi mountain at Northern west of Kukherd city, which added remarkably to its altitude and height. The total length of its interface from the North is about 111 metres, while its Northern interface extends over 67.5 metres. The structure was also near to the Nakh Mountain.

== History ==
The history of Tawseelah castle goes back to the Sassanid era (226–651). It was the center of government of that area as well as it acted as fortified military base for some time and was surrounded by a huge trench for protection. A trench was an ancient defensive strategic feature utilized to defend the cities, castles and the forts in Persia before Islamic era. The Castle of Tawseelah was maintained until 1163–1192. It was destroyed by an earthquake in Kukherd city, and was affected by the flood in 1367, which destroyed the remainder of the castle. This is the third castle In Kukherd city in the Hormozgan Province of southern Iran.

- 1. Castle of Aamaj
- 2 . Castle of Siba
- 3. Castle of Tawseelah

- Castle of Siba
- Bastak
- Bandar Lengeh
- Hormozgān
- Maghoh
- AL madani
- Paraw Kukherd
- The Historic Bath of Siba
- Sassanid family tree — of the Sasanian (Sassanid) dynasty
