= Aamaj Castle =

Coordinates: 27°04′34″N 54°28′03″E

Castle of Aamaj Kukherd قلعه آماج كوخرد
- Archaeological site
- Interactive map of Castle of Aamaj Kukherd
- Country: Iran
- Province: Hormozgan
- County: Bastak
- Bakhsh: Kukherd
- Time zone: UTC+3:30 (IRST)
  - Summer (DST): UTC+4:30 (IRDT)

The Castle of Aamaj (from Arabic: قلعة آماج, (Persian: قلعه آماج), Aamaj castle is one of the most significant examples for trench-enclosed, fortified structures in the Kukherd District, Hormozgan province in south Iran.

== Location ==
Aamaj castle was a squared fortified structure situated 1000 away from Kukherd city. It was built on a hill above the palm oasis at southern west of Kukherd city, a location which added significantly to its altitude and height. The structure was also sited near the monuments of ancient The Historic Bath of Siba. The total length of its interface from the south is about 111 metres, while its southern interface extends over 98.5 metres.

== History ==
The history of Aamaj castle dates back to the Sassanid era (226–651) when it was the center of government of that area, and also served as a fortified military base surrounded by a large trench. This trench was an ancient strategic feature used to defend Persian cities, castles and the forts prior to the Islamic era.

The Castle of Aamaj was maintained until 1163-1192 when it was damaged by an earthquake in Kukherd city. The remanning parts of the castle were then destroyed by a flood in 1367.

- Castle of Siba
- Bastak
- Bandar Lengeh
- Hormozgān
- Maghoh
- AL madani
- Paraw Kukherd
- The Historic Bath of Siba
- Sassanid family tree – of the Sasanian (Sassanid) dynasty
