= Razi Hospital Kukherd =

Geography
- Location: Kukherd City, Iran
- Coordinates: 27.083936°N 54.499380°E

Organisation
- Type: Community

Services
- Beds: 40

History
- Constructed: 1996
- Opened: March 2001

Links
- Website: Kookherd
- Lists: Hospitals in Iran

The Razi Hospital Kukherd in Kukherd District (from Arabic: مستشفى الرازي كوخرد, in Persian: بيمارستان رازى كوخرد), is a rural general hospital located in the Kukherd City, Iran. It serves an estimated 1,000 patients per year.

== History ==
The hospital was built in 1996. It situated to the west of the Kukherd city. The Hospital first opened in March 2001. The main building of Razi Hospital Kukherd is located on the Mean Street in the Kukherd District, Bastak County, Hormozgan Province, Iran

== See also ==
- Bastak
- Paraw Kukherd
- The Historic Bath of Siba
- Castle of Siba
