= Two domes of Kukherd =

Two domes of Kukherd —Qubatean دوگنبدان كوخرد
- Archaeological site
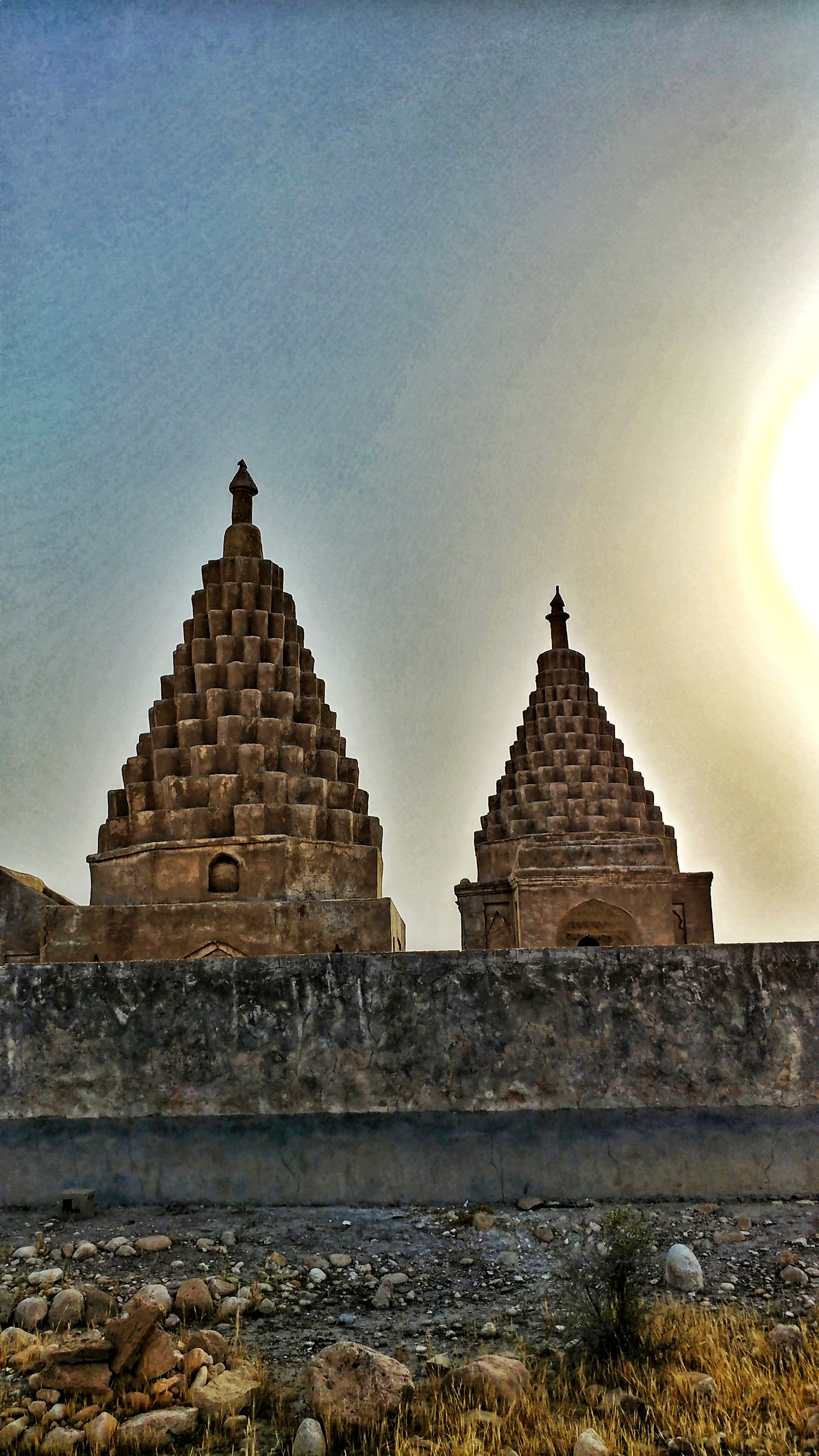
- آرامگاه دو سیدان Two domes of Kukherd (Dugambadan of Kukherd)in Kukherdcity
- Interactive map of Two domes of Kukherd —Qubatean
- Country: Iran
- Province: Hormozgan
- County: Bastak
- Bakhsh: Kukherd
- Time zone: UTC+3:30 (IRST)
  - Summer (DST): UTC+4:30 (IRDT)

The Two domes of Kukherd in Kukherd Arabic: دوكنبدان ـ قبتين, in Persian: دوگنبدان كوخرد) are tombs that date from the time of early Afsharid Iran. The tombs were built between 1145 and 1151 AH (1732 to 1738 AD).

== History ==
The tombs were built between 1145 and 1151 AH (1732–1738 AD).

== See also ==
- Bastak
- Paraw Kukherd
- The Historic Bath of Siba
- Castle of Siba
