= Azdi Bastak =

Coordinates: 27.1946°N 54.8648°E

Azdi Bastak ازدی
- Village
- Interactive map of Azdi Bastak
- Country: Iran
- Province: Hormozgan
- County: Bastak
- Bakhsh: Central District
- Time zone: UTC+3:30 (IRST)
  - Summer (DST): UTC+4:30 (IRDT)

Azdi Bastak (Persian: روستاى ازدي) is a village in Hormozgan Province in the south of Iran.

Azdi Bastak is a small village from Central District (Persian: بخش مركزى) in the city of Bastak (Bastak County شهرستان بستک) Hormozgan Province.

== See also ==
- Kookherd
- Bastak
- Bandar Abbas
- Morbagh
- Bandar Lengeh
- Hormozgān
- Larestan
- Lar, Iran
- Evaz
- Morbagh
- Bandar Abbas
- Fareghan
- Ravidar
- Kish Island
- Maghoh
- Chale Kookherd
