= Jawid Dam =

Dam in Hormozgan, Iran

- Location within Iran
- Official name: سد جاوید
- Location: Kukherd, Hormozgan Province, Iran
- Coordinates: 27°04′08.09″N 54°31′44.78″E
- Construction began: 1100
- Opening date: 1103

Dam and spillways
- Impounds: Geri Konar Valley
- Height: 65 m (213 ft)
- Length: 150 m (490 ft)
- Width (base): 99 m (325 ft)

Reservoir
- Creates: 95 MCM

Jawid Dam (from Arabic: سَّد جاويد, in Persian: سد جاوید), also known as Jaweed Dam, is a dam in Kukherd city, southwestern Kukherd District, Hormozgan Province, Iran.

== Geology ==
The Geri Konar Valley basin is located in the southern part of Zeer Mountain and southern Dasak Mountain is a beg Mount from Kukherd District (Persian: بخش كوخرد) in the city of Kukherd in Bastak County (شهرستان بستک) of Hormozgan Province.

Jawid Dam was named after Haji Ismaeil Jaweed.
