= Khe Aab Mountain =

Khe Aab Mountain کوه خآب
- Mount
- Location within Iran
- Coordinates: 27°05′14″N 54°29′30″E
- Country: Iran
- Province: Hormozgan
- County: Bastak
- Bakhsh: Kukherd

Population (2006)
  - Total: 3,144
- Time zone: UTC+3:30 (IRST)
  - Summer (DST): UTC+4:30 (IRDT)

Khe Aab Mountain (Persian: کوه خآب) is a mountain in Kukherd Rural District, Kukherd District, Bastak County, the Hormozgan Province in the south of Iran. It is in the Kukherd District (Persian: بخش كوخرد) in the city of Bastak, (Bastak County شهرستان بستک) in Hormozgan Province.

== See also ==
- Dasak Mountain
- List of mountains in Iran
- Nakh Mountain
- The Historic Bath of Siba
- Zeer Mountain
