= Shahrak-e Salehabad =

Shahrak-e Salehabad شهرك صالح اباد
- Village
- Location within Iran
- Coordinates: 27°04′39″N 54°33′07″E
- Country: Iran
- Province: Hormozgan
- County: Bastak
- Bakhsh: Kukherd
- Rural District: Kukherd

Population (2006)
  - Total: 280
- Time zone: UTC+3:30 (IRST)
  - Summer (DST): UTC+4:30 (IRDT)

Shahrak-e Salehabad (Persian: شهرك صالح اباد, also Romanized as Shahrak-e Şāleḩābād; also known as Şāleḩābād) is a village in Kukherd Rural District, Kukherd District, Bastak County, Hormozgan Province, Iran. At the 2006 census, its population was 280, in 59 families.
