= Talkh-e Ataher =

Talkh-e Ataher تلخ اطهر
- Village
- Location within Iran
- Coordinates: 27°00′10″N 54°42′40″E
- Country: Iran
- Province: Hormozgan
- County: Bastak
- Bakhsh: Kukherd
- Rural District: Kukherd

Population (2006)
  - Total: 155
- Time zone: UTC+3:30 (IRST)
  - Summer (DST): UTC+4:30 (IRDT)

Talkh-e Ataher (Persian: تلخ اطهر, also Romanized as Talkh-e Āṭaher; also known as Talkh) is a village in Kukherd Rural District, Kukherd District, Bastak County, Hormozgan Province, Iran. At the 2006 census, its population was 155, in 30 families.
