= Lavar, Bastak =

Lavar لاور
- Village
- Location within Iran
- Coordinates: 27°04′21″N 54°42′15″E
- Country: Iran
- Province: Hormozgan
- County: Bastak
- Bakhsh: Kukherd
- Rural District: Kukherd

Population (2006)
  - Total: 544
- Time zone: UTC+3:30 (IRST)
  - Summer (DST): UTC+4:30 (IRDT)

Lavar (Persian: لاور, also Romanized as Lāvar; also known as Lavar Shikh) is a village in Kukherd Rural District, Kukherd District, Bastak County, Hormozgan Province, Iran. At the 2006 census, its population was 544 in 115 families.
