= Terenah =

Terenah —Kukherd تِرِنُه كوخرد
- Archaeological site
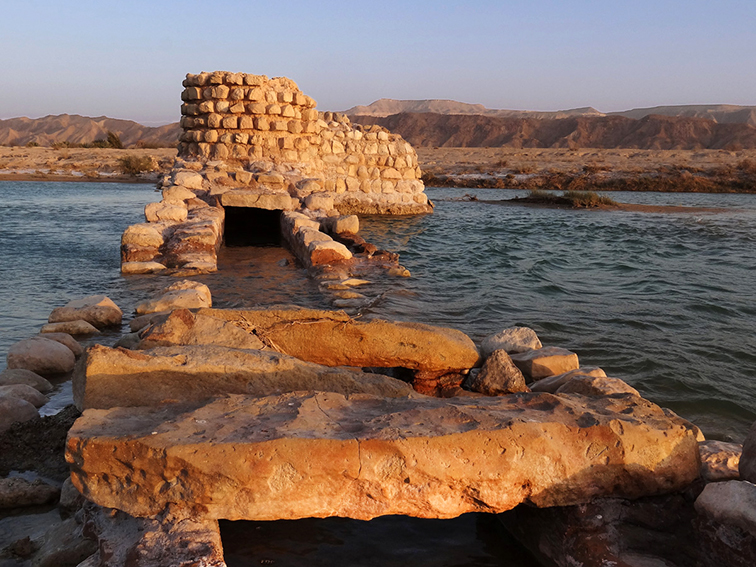
- Terenah in Kukherd city
- Interactive map of Terenah —Kukherd
- Country: Iran
- Province: Hormozgan
- County: Bastak
- Bakhsh: Kukherd
- Time zone: UTC+3:30 (IRST)
  - Summer (DST): UTC+4:30 (IRDT)

Terenah (from Arabic: تـِرنـُه, in Persian: ترنه), the unique ancient methods of ancient Kukherd population have been using to transfer the sweet water from Mehran salty river to the other bank of the river order to water their lands.

The Terenah is a water management system used and ruins are located in the Kukherd District (Persian: بخش كوخرد), in Hormozgan Province. They are under the administration of the city of Bastak.

The Terenah are an archaeological site of Sassanid architecture.

== Technical features ==
Terenah are constructed as a series of well-like vertical shafts, connected by gently sloping tunnels. Terenah tap into subterranean water in a manner that efficiently delivers large quantities of water to the surface without need for pumping. The water drains relying on gravity, with the destination lower than the source, which is typically an upland aquifer. Terenah allow water to be transported over long distances in hot dry climates without losing a large proportion of the water to seepage and evaporation.

== Impact of Terenah on settlement patterns ==
A typical town or city in Iran and elsewhere where the qanat is used has more than one Terenah. Fields and gardens are located both over the Terenah a short distance before they emerge from the ground and after the surface outlet. Water from the Terenah defines both the social regions in the city and the layout of the city.

The water is freshest, cleanest, and coolest in the upper reaches and more prosperous people live at the outlet or immediately upstream of the outlet. When the Terenah is still below grade, the water is drawn to the surface via water wells or animal driven Persian wells. Private subterranean reservoirs could supply houses and buildings for domestic use and garden irrigation as well. Further, air flow from the Terenah is used to cool an underground summer room (shabestan) found in many older houses and buildings.

== See also ==
- History of water supply and sanitation
  - Ancient water conservation techniques
  - Water supply and sanitation in the Indus-Saraswati Valley Civilisation
  - Sanitation in ancient Rome
  - Traditional water sources of Persian antiquity
