= Karun, Hormozgan =

Karun كرون
- Village
- Location within Iran
- Coordinates: 27°08′28″N 54°29′27″E
- Country: Iran
- Province: Hormozgan
- County: Bastak
- Bakhsh: Kukherd
- Rural District: Kukherd

Population (2006)
  - Total: 18
- Time zone: UTC+3:30 (IRST)
  - Summer (DST): UTC+4:30 (IRDT)

Karun (Persian: كرون, also Romanized as Korūn) is a village in Kukherd Rural District, Kukherd District, Bastak County, Hormozgan Province, Iran. At the 2006 census, its population was 18, in 4 families.
