= Boz Dam =

Dam in Hormozgan, Iran

- Location within Iran
- Official name: سَدِّ بُز
- Location: Kukherd, Hormozgan Province, Iran
- Coordinates: 27°03′51.38″N 54°30′17.70″E
- Construction began: 1100
- Opening date: 1103

Dam and spillways
- Impounds: Bust gez Valley
- Height: 65 m (213 ft)
- Length: 150 m (490 ft)
- Width (base): 99 m (325 ft)

Reservoir
- Creates: 95 MCM

Boz Dam (from Arabic: سَدّ بُز, in Persian: سد بز), also known as Buz Dam, is a dam in Kukherd city, southwestern Kukherd District, Hormozgan Province, Iran.

== Location ==
Bust gez Valley basin is located in the southern part of Zeer Mountain and southern Dasak Mountain is a beg Mount from Kukherd District (Persian: بخش كوخرد) in the city of Bastak (Bastak County شهرستان بستک) Hormozgan Province.
