= Asu, Hormozgan =

Asu اسو
- Village
- Location within Iran
- Coordinates: 27°04′38″N 54°34′09″E
- Country: Iran
- Province: Hormozgan
- County: Bastak
- Bakhsh: Kukherd
- Rural District: Kukherd

Population (2006)
  - Total: 224
- Time zone: UTC+3:30 (IRST)
  - Summer (DST): UTC+4:30 (IRDT)

Asu (Persian: اسو, also Romanized as Āsū) is a village in Kukherd Rural District, Kukherd District, Bastak County, Hormozgan Province, Iran. At the 2006 census, its population was 224, in 38 families.
