= Dasak Mountain =

Dasak Mountain دسک
- Mount
- Location within Iran
- Coordinates: 27°05′14″N 54°29′30″E
- Country: Iran
- Province: Hormozgan
- County: Bastak
- Bakhsh: Kukherd

Population (2006)
  - Total: 3,144
- Time zone: UTC+3:30 (IRST)
  - Summer (DST): UTC+4:30 (IRDT)

Dasak Mountain (Persian: دسک) is a mountain in Kukherd Rural District, Kukherd District, Bastak County, Hormozgan Province in the south of Iran.

Dasak mountain the beg Mount from Kukherd District (Persian: بخش كوخرد) in the city of Bastak (Bastak County شهرستان بستک) Hormozgan Province.

== See also ==
- Zeer Mountain
- Khe Aab Mountain
- Nakh Mountain
- The Historic Bath of Siba
