= Maghdan, Bastak =

Maghdan مغدان
- Village
- Location within Iran
- Coordinates: 27°13′52″N 54°20′11″E
- Country: Iran
- Province: Hormozgan
- County: Bastak
- Bakhsh: Kukherd
- Rural District: Harang

Population (2006)
  - Total: 377
- Time zone: UTC+3:30 (IRST)
  - Summer (DST): UTC+4:30 (IRDT)

Maghdan (Persian: مغدان, also Romanized as Maghdān; also known as Māgdūn, Maghdūn, and Māqdūn) is a village in Harang Rural District, Kukherd District, Bastak County, Hormozgan Province, Iran. At the 2006 census, its population was 377, in 88 families.
