= Bar, Hormozgan =

Bar بار
- Village
- Location within Iran
- Coordinates: 27°05′13″N 54°37′21″E
- Country: Iran
- Province: Hormozgan
- County: Bastak
- Bakhsh: Kukherd
- Rural District: Kukherd

Population (2006)
  - Total: 113
- Time zone: UTC+3:30 (IRST)
  - Summer (DST): UTC+4:30 (IRDT)

Bar (Persian: بار, also Romanized as Bār) is a village in Kukherd Rural District, Kukherd District, Bastak County, Hormozgan Province, Iran. At the 2006 census, its population was 113, in 23 families.
