= Kuran, Bastak =

Kuran كوران
- Village
- Location within Iran
- Coordinates: 27°00′23″N 54°39′38″E
- Country: Iran
- Province: Hormozgan
- County: Bastak
- Bakhsh: Kukherd
- Rural District: Kukherd

Population (2006)
  - Total: 122
- Time zone: UTC+3:30 (IRST)
  - Summer (DST): UTC+4:30 (IRDT)

Kuran (Persian: كوران, also Romanized as Kūrān; also known as Korān) is a village in Kukherd Rural District, Kukherd District, Bastak County, Hormozgan Province, Iran. At the 2006 census, its population was 122, in 21 families.
