= Konar Zard =

Konar Zard كنارزرد
- Village
- Location within Iran
- Coordinates: 27°02′40″N 54°40′43″E
- Country: Iran
- Province: Hormozgan
- County: Bastak
- Bakhsh: Kukherd
- Rural District: Kukherd

Population (2006)
  - Total: 242
- Time zone: UTC+3:30 (IRST)
  - Summer (DST): UTC+4:30 (IRDT)

Konar Zard (Persian: كنارزرد, also Romanized as Konār Zard, Kanār-e Zard, and Konār-e Zard) is a village in Kukherd Rural District, Kukherd District, Bastak County, Hormozgan Province, Iran. At the 2006 census, its population was 242, in 53 families.
