= Shamo Dam =

Dam in Hormozgan, Iran

- Location within Iran
- Official name: سَّد شمو
- Location: Kukherd, Hormozgan Province, Iran
- Coordinates: 27.1023°N 54.4923°E
- Construction began: 1100
- Opening date: 1103

Dam and spillways
- Impounds: Shamo Valley
- Height: 65 m (213 ft)
- Length: 150 m (490 ft)
- Width (base): 99 m (325 ft)

Reservoir
- Creates: 95 MCM

Shamo dam (from Arabic: سَّد شمو, in Persian: سد شمو also known as Sad Shamo, is a dam in Kukherd, southwestern Kukherd District, Hormozgan Province, Iran.

== Geology ==
The Shamo Valley basin is located in the southern part of Nakh Mountain, and southern Drakhi mountain is a beg Mount from Kukherd District, Kukherd, in (Bastak County, Hormozgan Province. It was established in 1986 in the southern Nakh mountains, in the northern area of Kukherd, located in the valley of Shamo.

== watershed ==
The catchment area of this dam is Shamu Valley. This large and long valley, approximately 25 to 30 kilometers long, starts from the "North of Kukherd" and runs along the mountain slopes and passes through the "Drazu" region and then flows into the Mehran River.
