= Bust-e gez Dam =

Dam in Hormozgan, Iran

Bust gez dam
- Interactive map of Bust gez dam
- Official name: سَّد بست گز
- Location: Kukherd, Hormozgan Province, Iran

Dam and spillways
- Impounds: Bust gez Valley
- Height: 65 m (213 ft)
- Length: 150 m (490 ft)
- Width (base): 99 m (325 ft)

Reservoir
- Creates: 95 MCM

Bust gez dam (from Arabic: سَّد بست گز, in Persian: سد بَستِ گِز) also known as Bast gez dam , is a dam in Kukherd city, southwestern Kukherd District, Hormozgan Province, Iran.

== Geology ==
Bust gez Valley basin is located in the southern part of Zeer Mountain and southern Dasak Mountain is a beg Mount from Kukherd District (Persian: بخش كوخرد) in the city of Kukherd in Bastak County (شهرستان بستک) Hormozgan Province. Is a modern dam which was built in 2005 in southern mountain.
