= Takht-e Goru =

Takht-e Goru تخت گرو
- Village
- Location within Iran
- Coordinates: 27°06′08″N 54°36′28″E
- Country: Iran
- Province: Hormozgan
- County: Bastak
- Bakhsh: Kukherd
- Rural District: Kukherd

Population (2006)
  - Total: 153
- Time zone: UTC+3:30 (IRST)
  - Summer (DST): UTC+4:30 (IRDT)

Takht-e Goru (Persian: تخت گرو, also Romanized as Takht-e Gorū; also known as Takhteh Gorūh) is a village in Kukherd Rural District, Kukherd District, Bastak County, Hormozgan Province, Iran. At the 2006 census, its population was 153, in 30 families.
