= Jaber Dam =

Dam in Hormozgan, Iran

- Location within Iran
- Official name: سد جابر
- Location: Kukherd, Hormozgan Province, Iran
- Coordinates: 27°03′47.88″N 54°29′02.30″E
- Construction began: 1100
- Opening date: 1103

Dam and spillways
- Impounds: Chan Valley
- Height: 65 m (213 ft)
- Length: 150 m (490 ft)
- Width (base): 99 m (325 ft)

Reservoir
- Creates: 95 MCM

Jaber Dam (from Arabic: سَّد جابر, in Persian: سد جابر), also known as Jabar Dam, is a dam in Kukherd city, southwestern Kukherd District, Hormozgan Province, Iran.

== Geology ==
The Chan Valley basin is located in the southern part of Zeer Mountain and southern Dasak Mountain is a beg Mount from Kukherd District (Persian: بخش كوخرد) in the city of Kukherd in (Bastak County شهرستان بستک) Hormozgan Province.

An old wall which was built 200 years ago at the stream of Jan valley, located in Hadaba "doghal galagh" دُوكَل كَلاغ. The name was after Jaber who built this wall.
