= Harang =

Neighborhood in Hormozgan province, Iran

Harang Persian: هرنگ
- Neighborhood
- Location within Iran
- Coordinates: 27°06′22″N 54°27′14″E
- Country: Iran
- Province: Hormozgan
- County: Bastak
- District: Kukherdharang
- City: Kukherdharang

Population (2016)
  - Total: 4,564
- Time zone: UTC+3:30 (IRST)

Harang (Persian: هرنگ) (Note: Also romanized as Herang; also known as Hurnak) is a neighborhood in the city of Kukherdharang in Kukherdharang District of Bastak County, Hormozgan province, Iran. As a village, it served as the capital of Harang Rural District until its administrative center was transferred to Kukherdharang.

== Demographics ==
=== Population ===
At the time of the 2006 National Census, Harang's population was 4,531 in 896 households, when it was a village in Harang Rural District. The following census in 2011 counted 5,082 people in 1,228 households. The 2016 census measured the population of the village as 4,564 people in 1,158 households. It was the most populous village in its rural district.

After the census, the village of Kukherd, after merging with Harang, was elevated to city status as Kukherdharang.
