= Irahistan =

Coordinates: 27°41′N 54°20′E

Irahistan ایراهستان
- Historical region
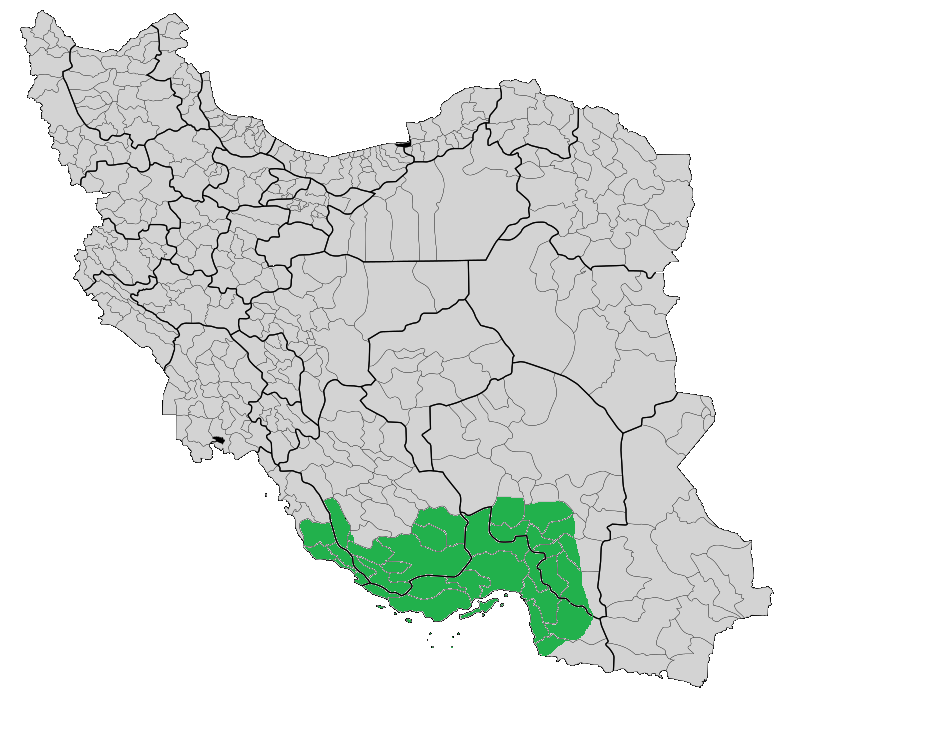
- Interactive map of Irahistan
- Country: Iran
- Province: Parts of Fars province, Hormozgan, Kerman and Bushehr province

Population (2006)
  - Total: 356,210
- Time zone: UTC+3:30 (IRST)
  - Summer (DST): UTC+4:30 (IRDT)

Irahistan or Irahestan (Persian: ایراهستان)is a historical region in Iran. Since long before the Safavid era, people have known that region as "Laristan / Larestan", referring to Lar (its capital) and the surrounding areas.

The region of Irahistan consists of several counties in Fars province (Larestan, Khonj County, Gerash County, Lamerd County, and Mohr County) and Bastak County, Bandar Lengeh County and Parsian County in Hormozgan. The region's importance grew during the Sassanid period with vast expansion of settlements in Irahistan.

In the book "Kar-Namag i Ardashir i Pabagan," which is written in Middle Persian, in the section describing the second war between Ardeshir and Haftvad, the name of Irahistan is mentioned:

The army wanted to go to the court and rushed to the campaign of Kerman with a large army. And when he approached the fortress, the army of Kerman all sat inside the fortress and Ardashir surrounded the fortress. Haftan Bakhtar had seven sons. He had assigned each of them to a city with a thousand men, and at this time one of them, who was in Irahistan, came to Kerman with a large army of greyhounds and Omanis across the sea and fought against Ardashir.

In medieval times, the region was ruled by local lords until they were removed by a Safavid invasion in 1610. In the thirteenth century, the city of Lar became a center of trade and commerce in Irahistan and the population of this city grew rapidly, outpacing the more historical towns and cities. The people in this region speak Persian (Farsi) and Larian (Larestani).

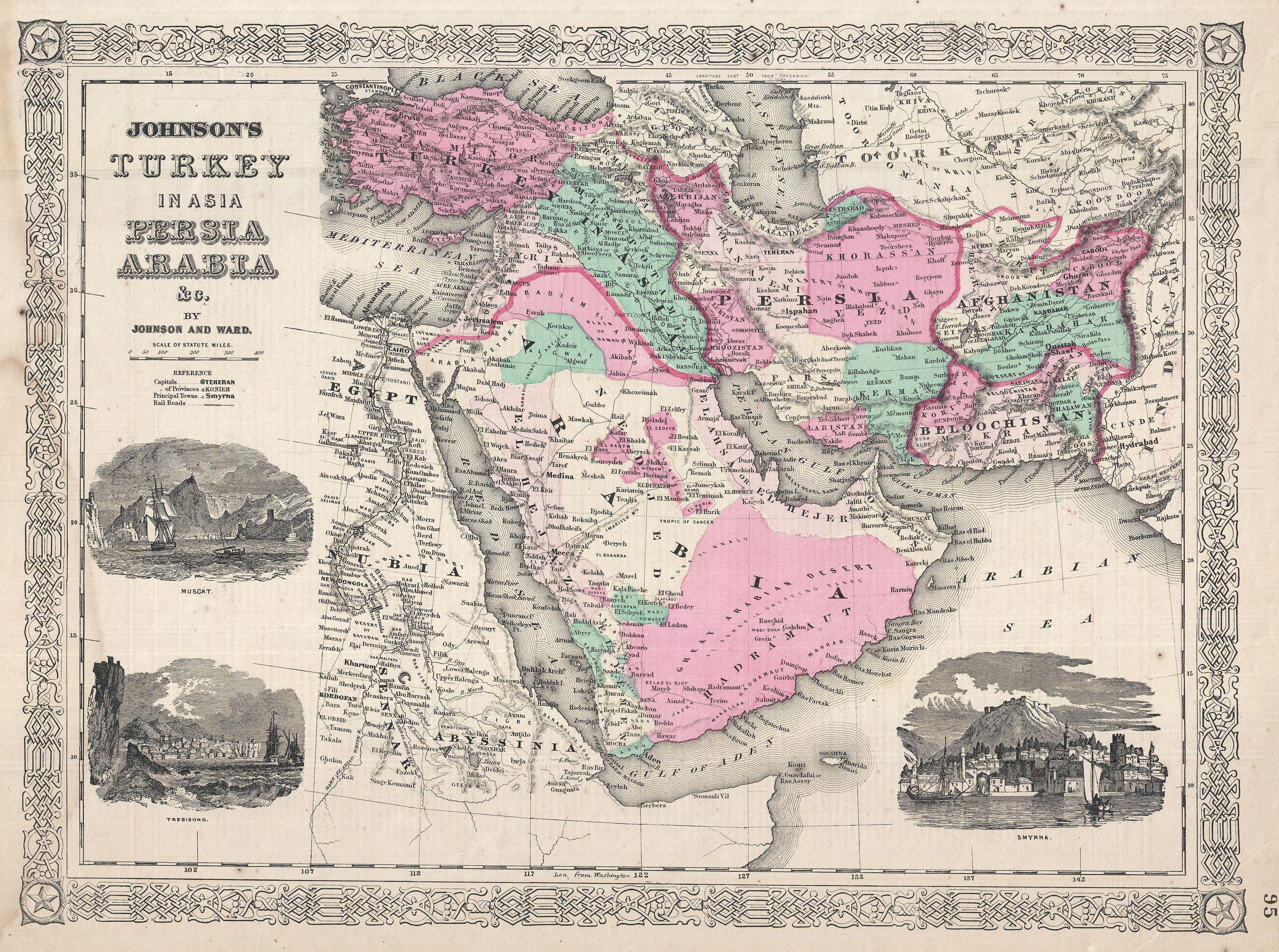
map of Persia and Arabia (1866). Laristan, in the south of Persia (Iran), is shown in pink.

Laris (sometimes Larestanis) or Achom people (from Arabic word "Ajam" to signify Persians) speak the Larian or Larestani language. The language is in decline and has reported eight dialects and it is mostly intelligible to speakers of mainstream Persian. The Lari people are of Persian descent. The majority of Larestan people are Sunni Muslims, with a Shia minority.

In the thirteenth century, Lar briefly became a center of trade and commerce in southern Persia. Irahistan was nearly always an obscure region, never becoming involved in the politics and conflicts of mainstream Persia. This was due to independent rule during the Safavid times, but that has failed due to the British Empire "Anti Piracy Company" and continued to decline due to Reza Shah Pahlavi's centric policies and the Ayatollah policies.

Iranian historian and geographer Ahmad Eghtedari noted in his book Ancient Larestan (1955):

"To those people of the towns, villages, and ports of Larestan who have stayed in the land of their ancestors, with its glorious past and its desolate present. And to those who have endured the hardship of migration to earn a living on the islands of the Persian Gulf and the Indian Ocean and in the towns of India, Arabia and other places. They remember with joy their beloved birthplace and still grieve for its ruin."

Larestani people refer to themselves as Khodmuni (Persian: خودمونی), a term literally meaning "like natives" (Persian: مانند خودیها).

== Geographical scope ==
The historical region of Irahistan consists of several cities, including:

- Hormozgan: Parsian, Bastak (Central, Kuhij, Kukherdharang, Jenah, Kukherd), Bander Langeh, Khamir, Bandar Abbas, Hajjiabad, Rudan, Minab, Sirik, parts of Bashagard, and Jask.
- Fars: Mohr, Khonj, Lamerd, Gerash, Evaz, Juyom, Zarrin Dasht, Darab, Larestan.
- Bushehr: Asaluyeh, Jam, Deir.
- Part of Kerman province.

== Gallery ==
=== Provinces ===
Bushehr province

Fars province

Hormozgan province

Kerman province

=== Historical locations ===
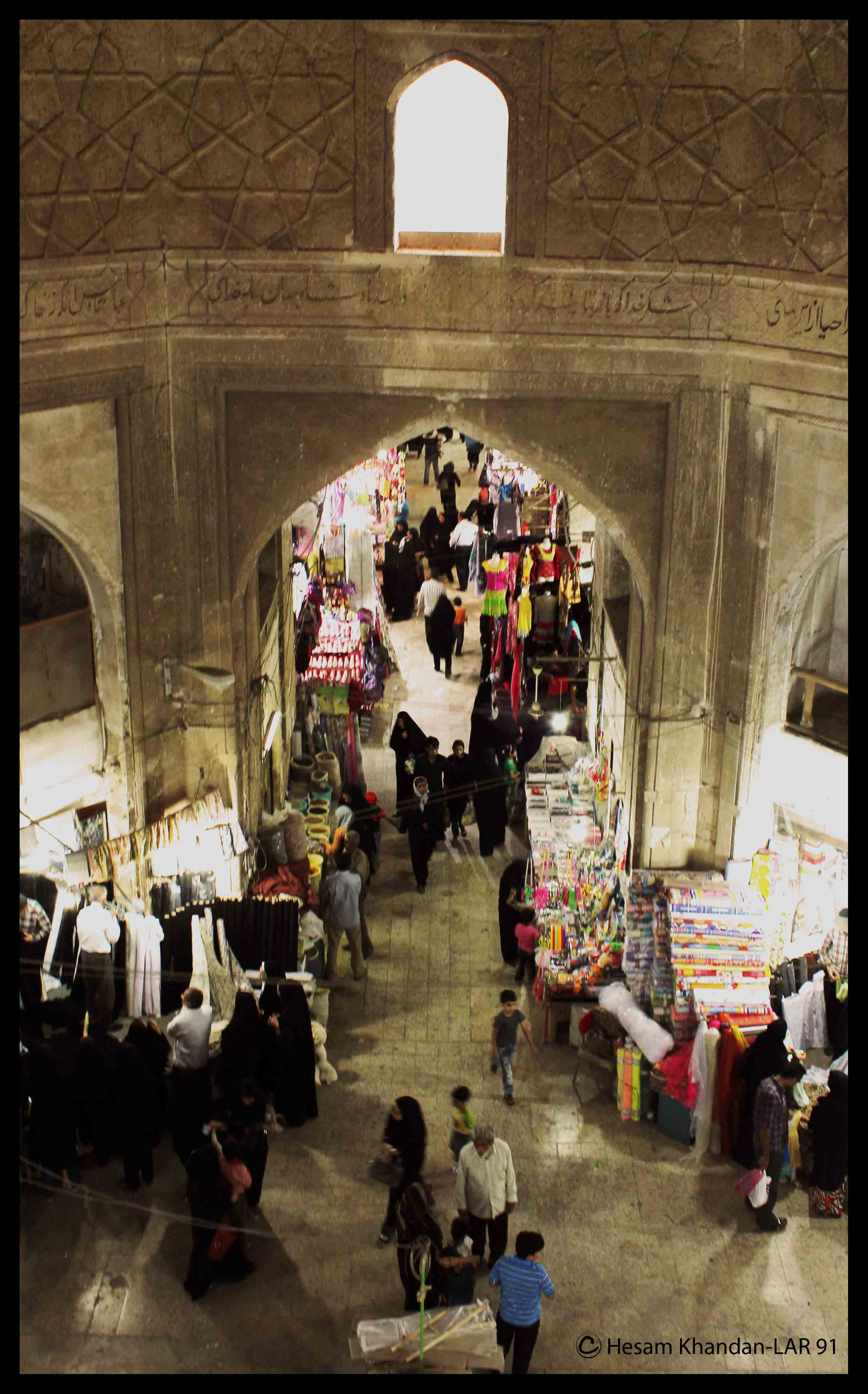
Kayseri Lar market

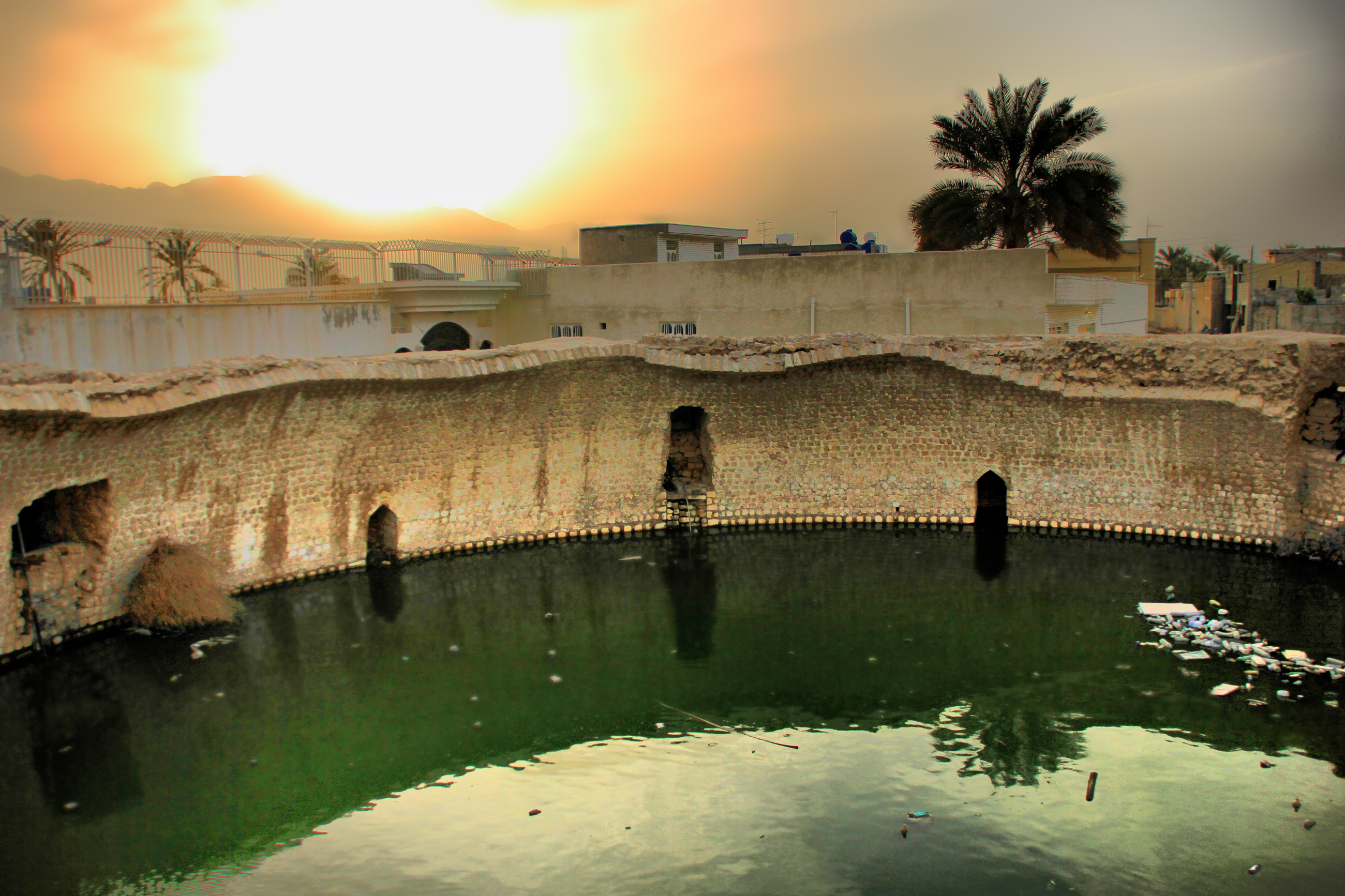
Iran's largest pond in Gerash

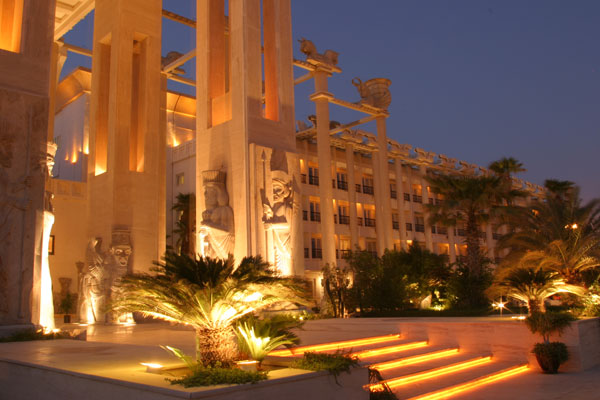
Great Dariush Hotel in Kish

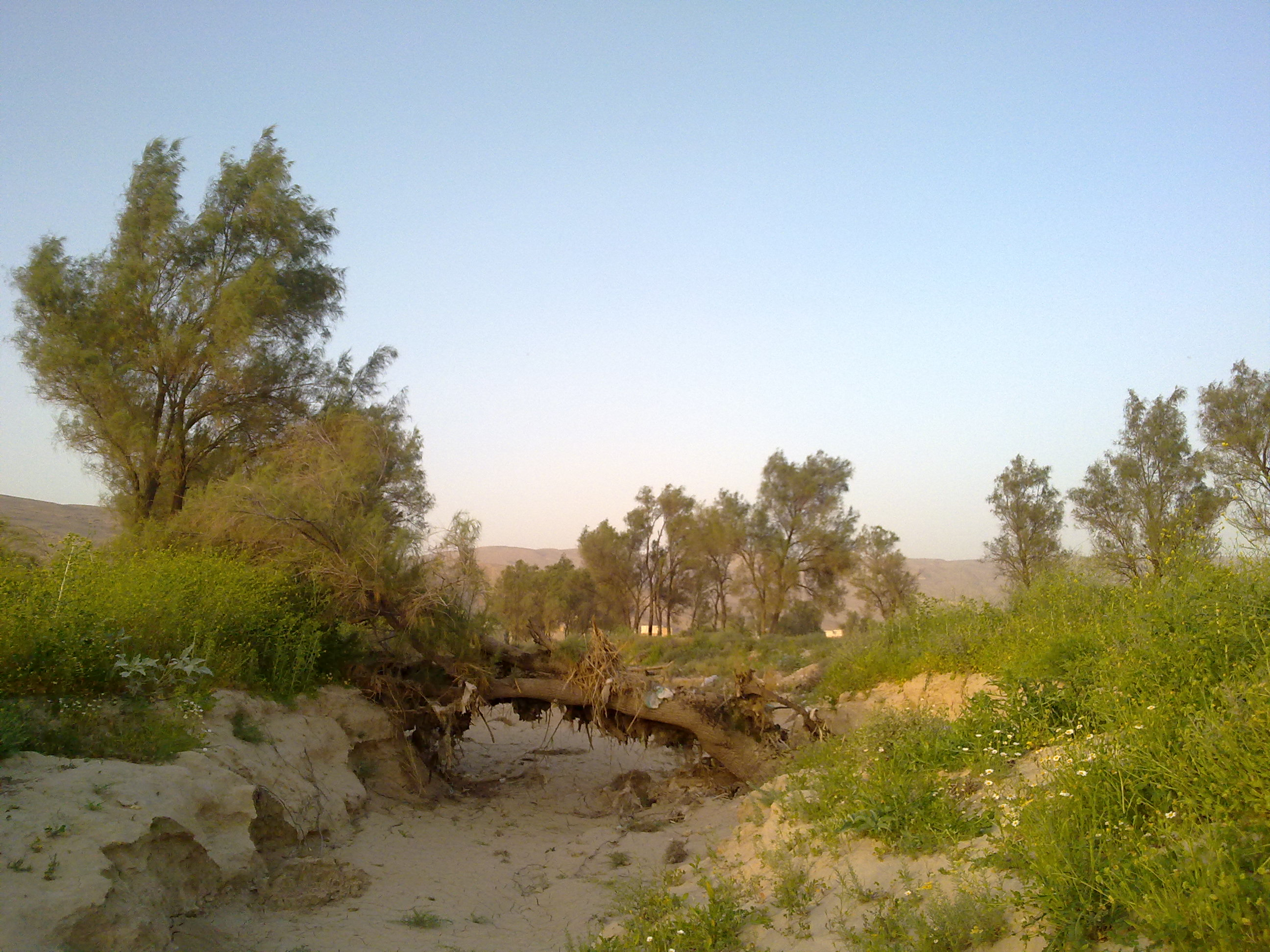
The nature of Bidshahr

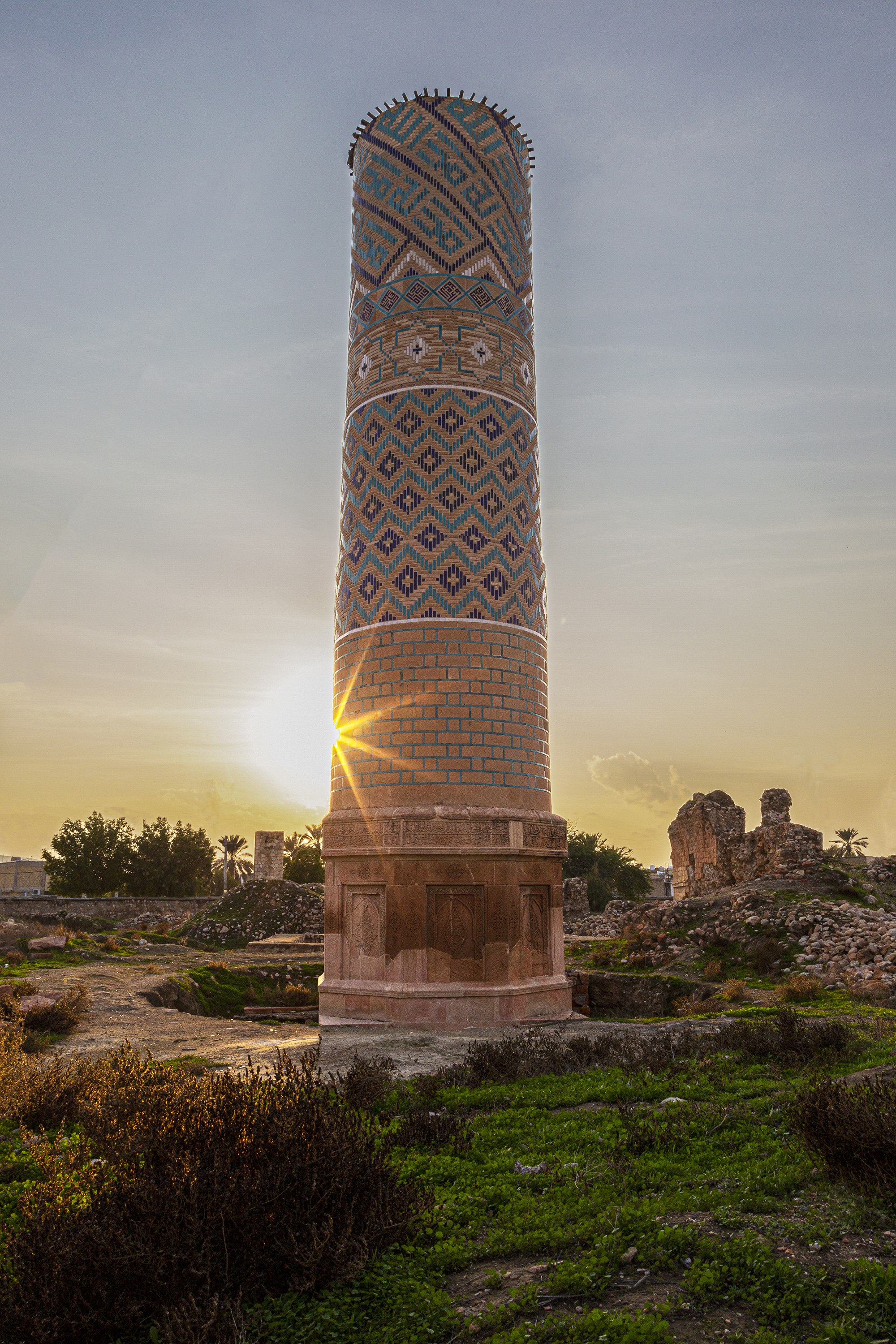
The minaret of Sheikh Daniel Khonji in Khonj, a survivor of the Seljuk period

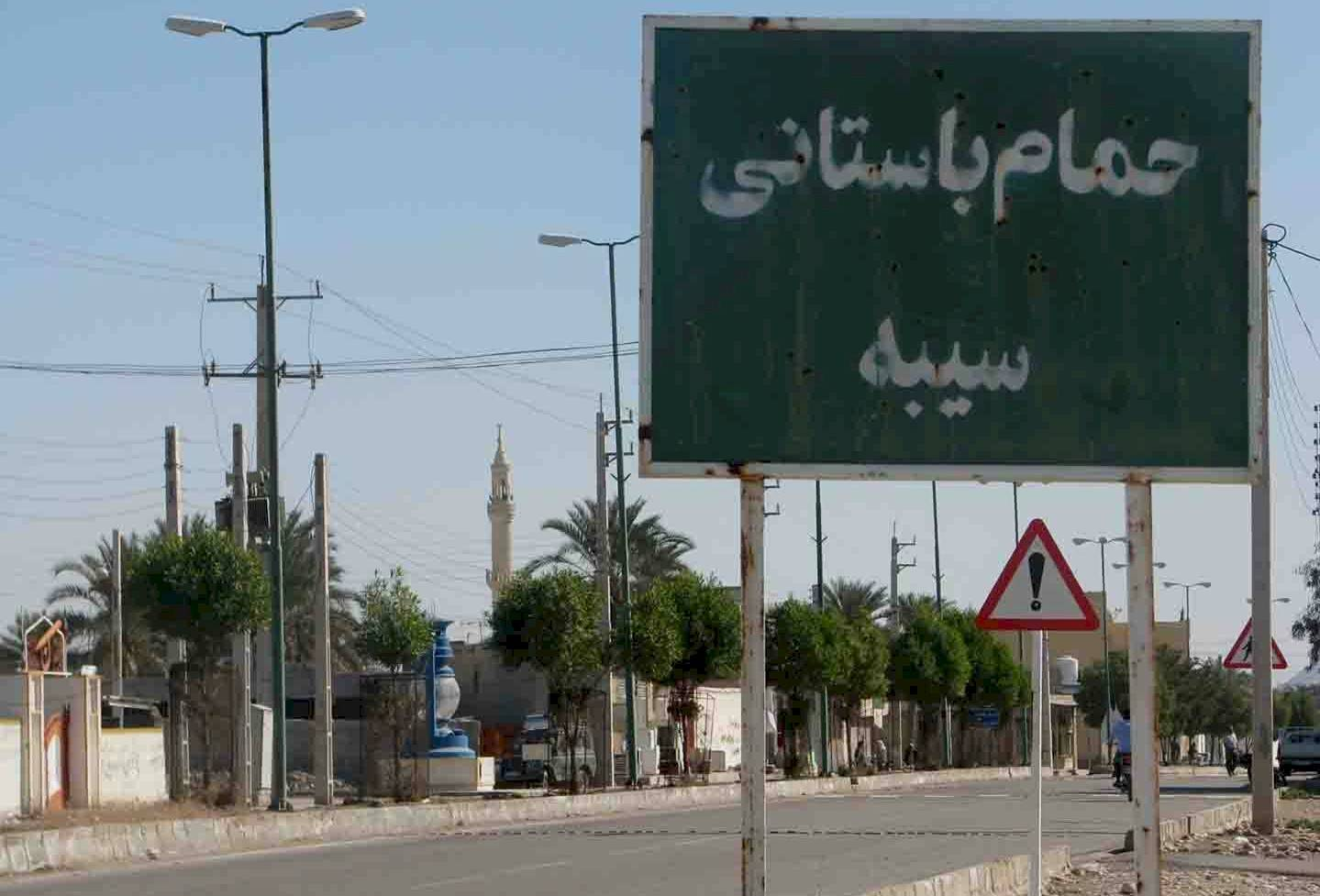
Siba bath 1

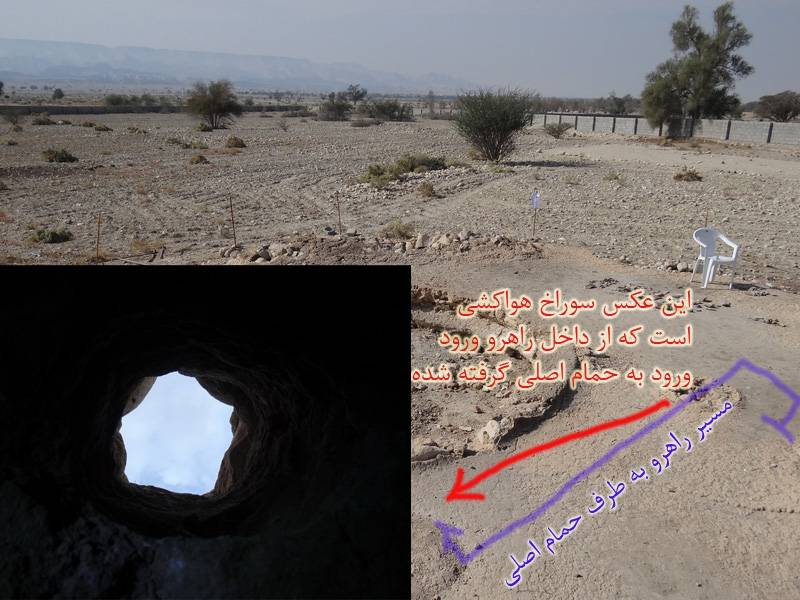
Siba bath 2

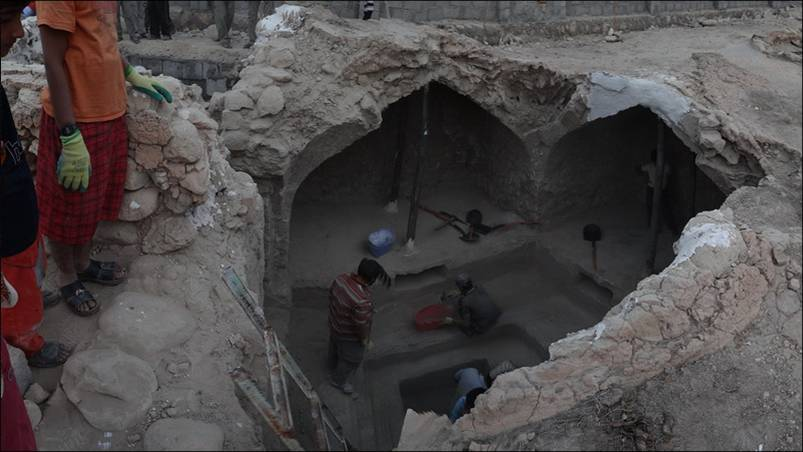
Siba bath 3

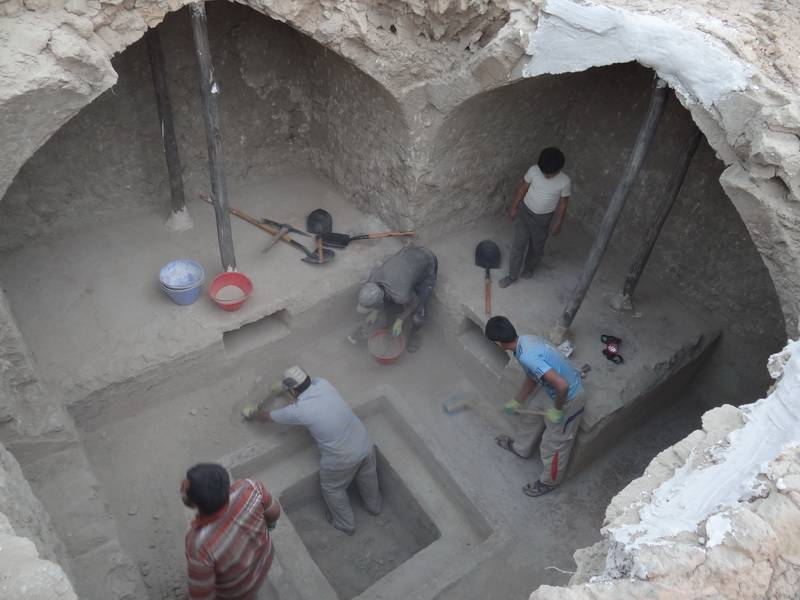
Siba bath 4

Kokherd Dome

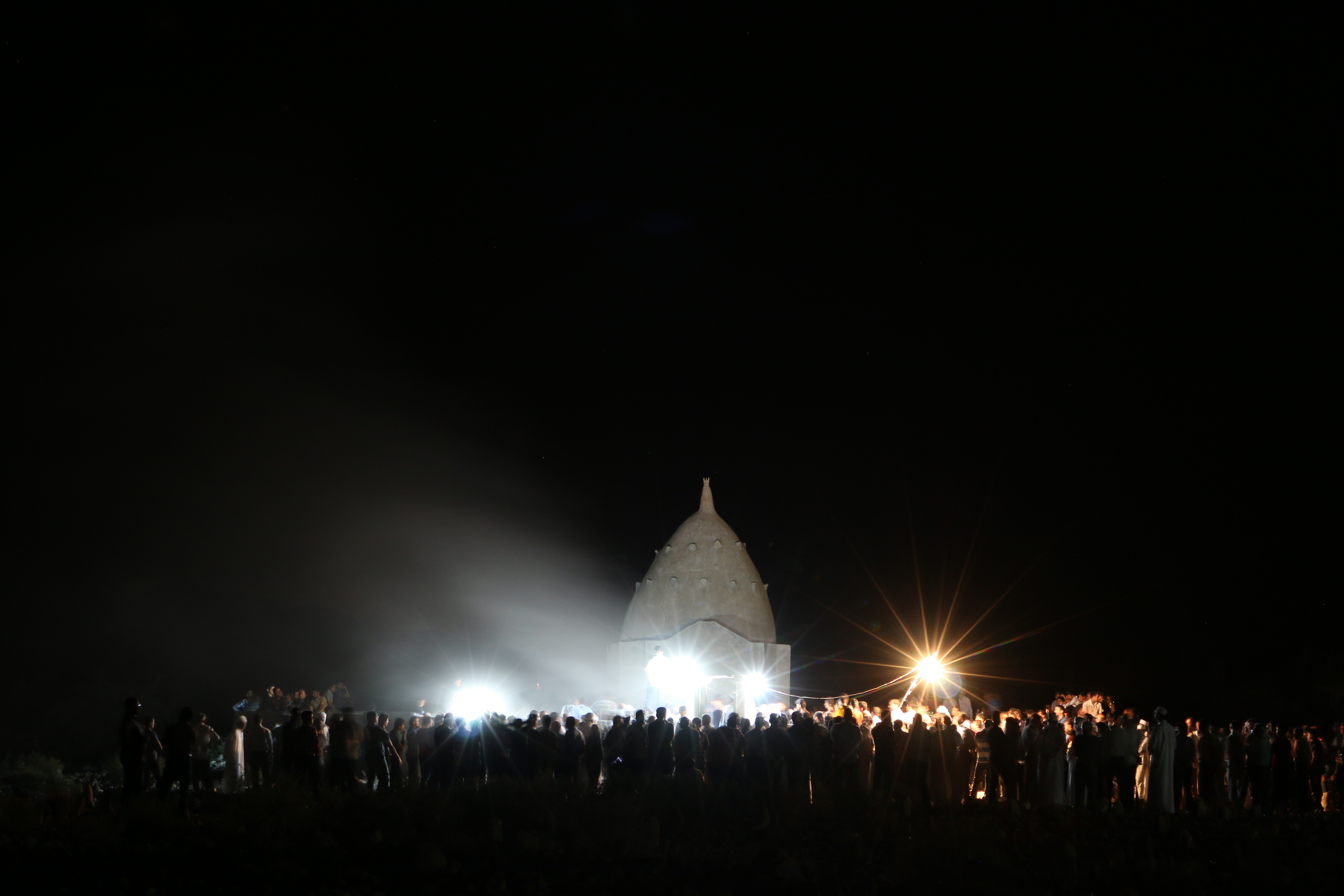
Seyyed Muzafar Kokhard's tomb

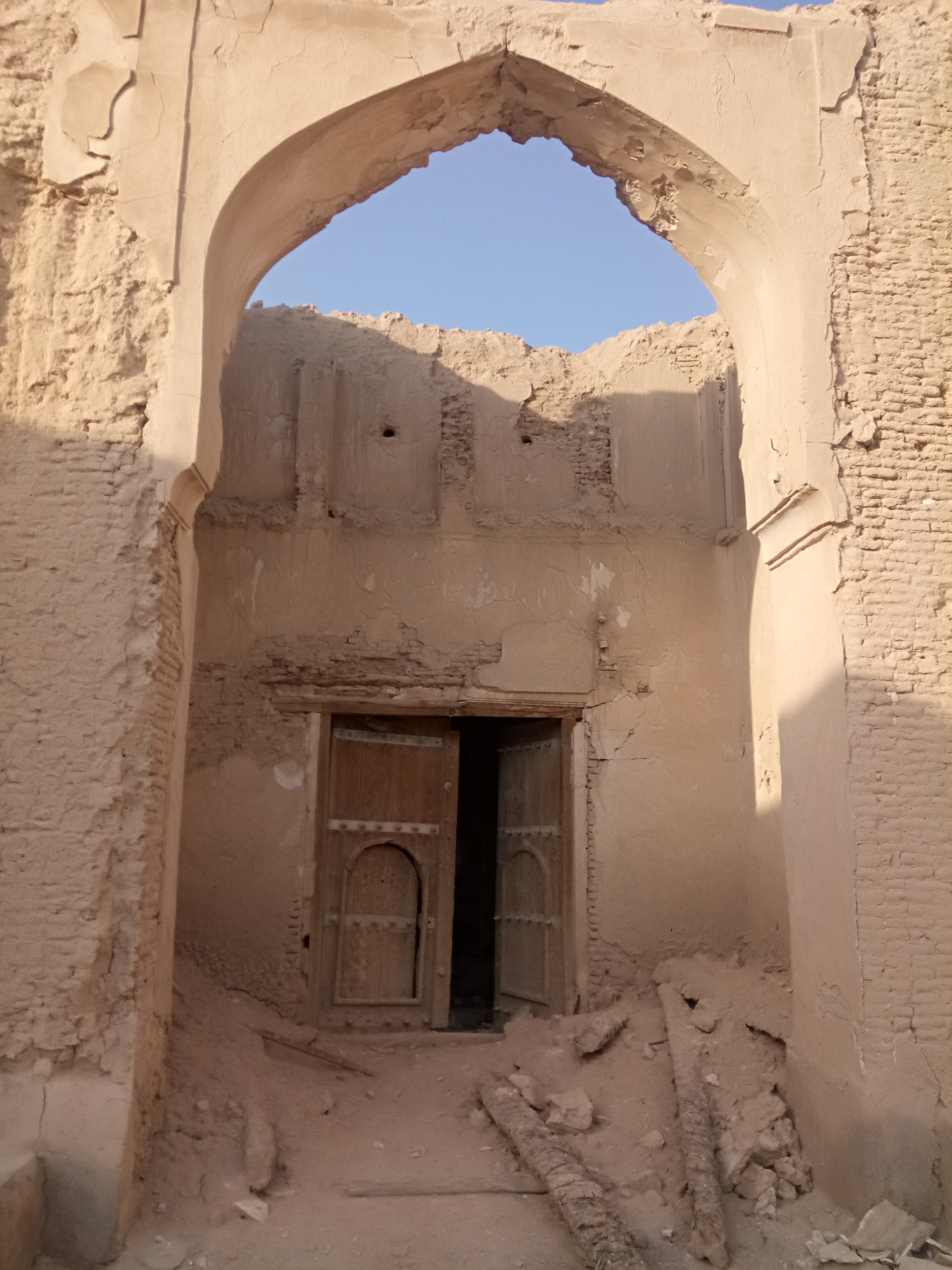
Entrance to Khan Bestak Castle

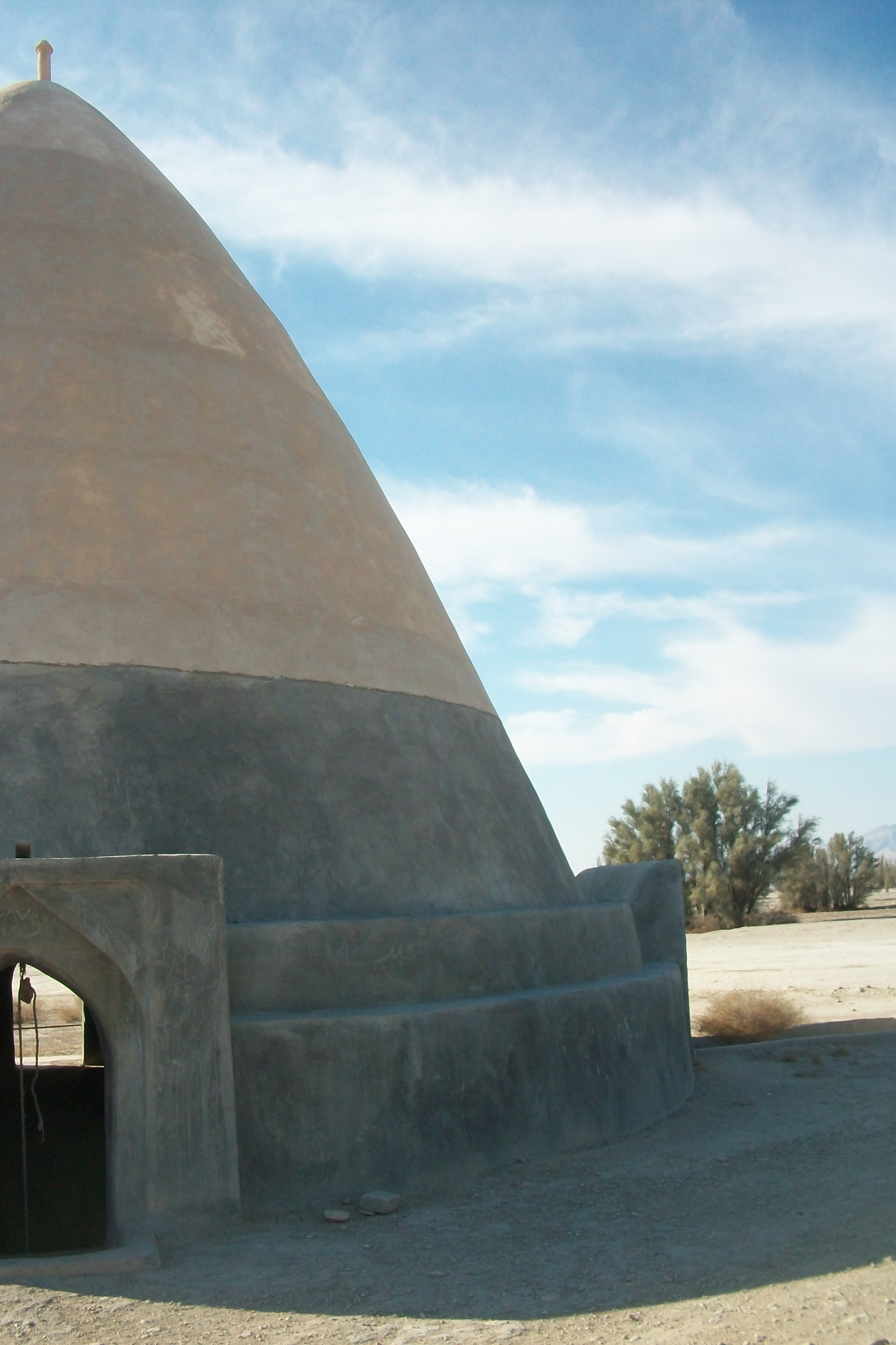
Bastak reservoirs

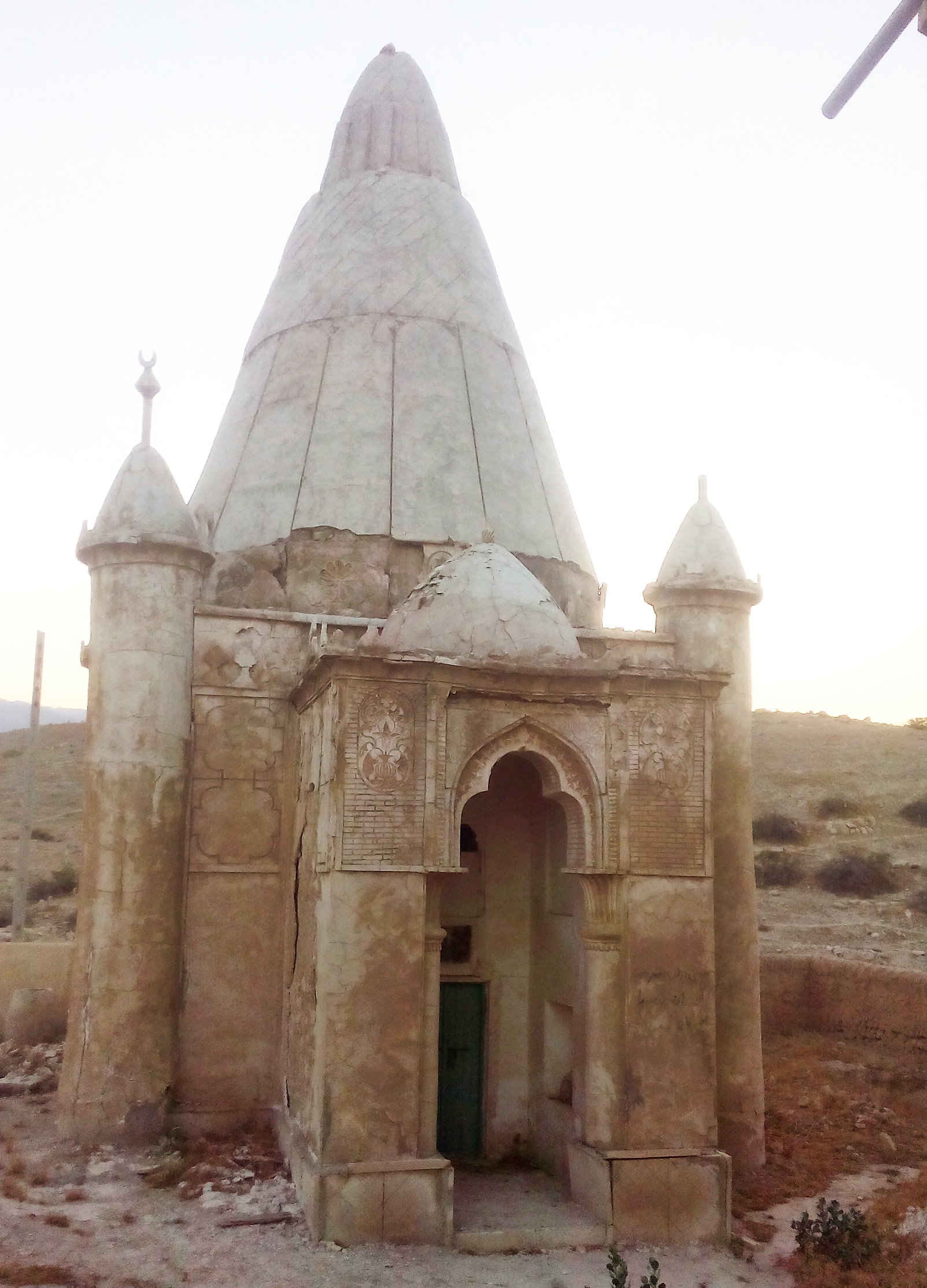
The grave of Sheikh Abdul Qadir Bastaki

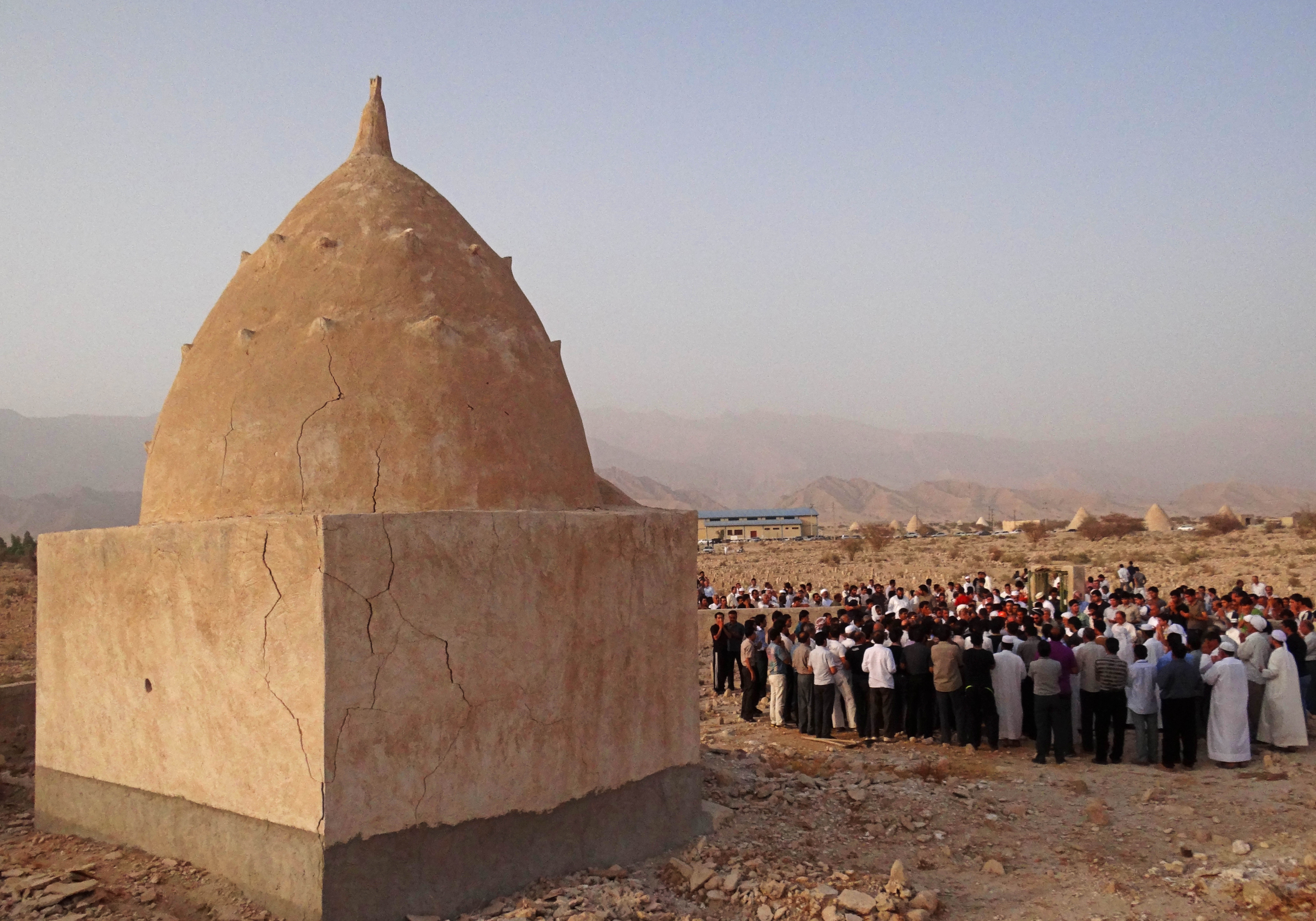
Seyyed Muzafar Kokherd's tomb

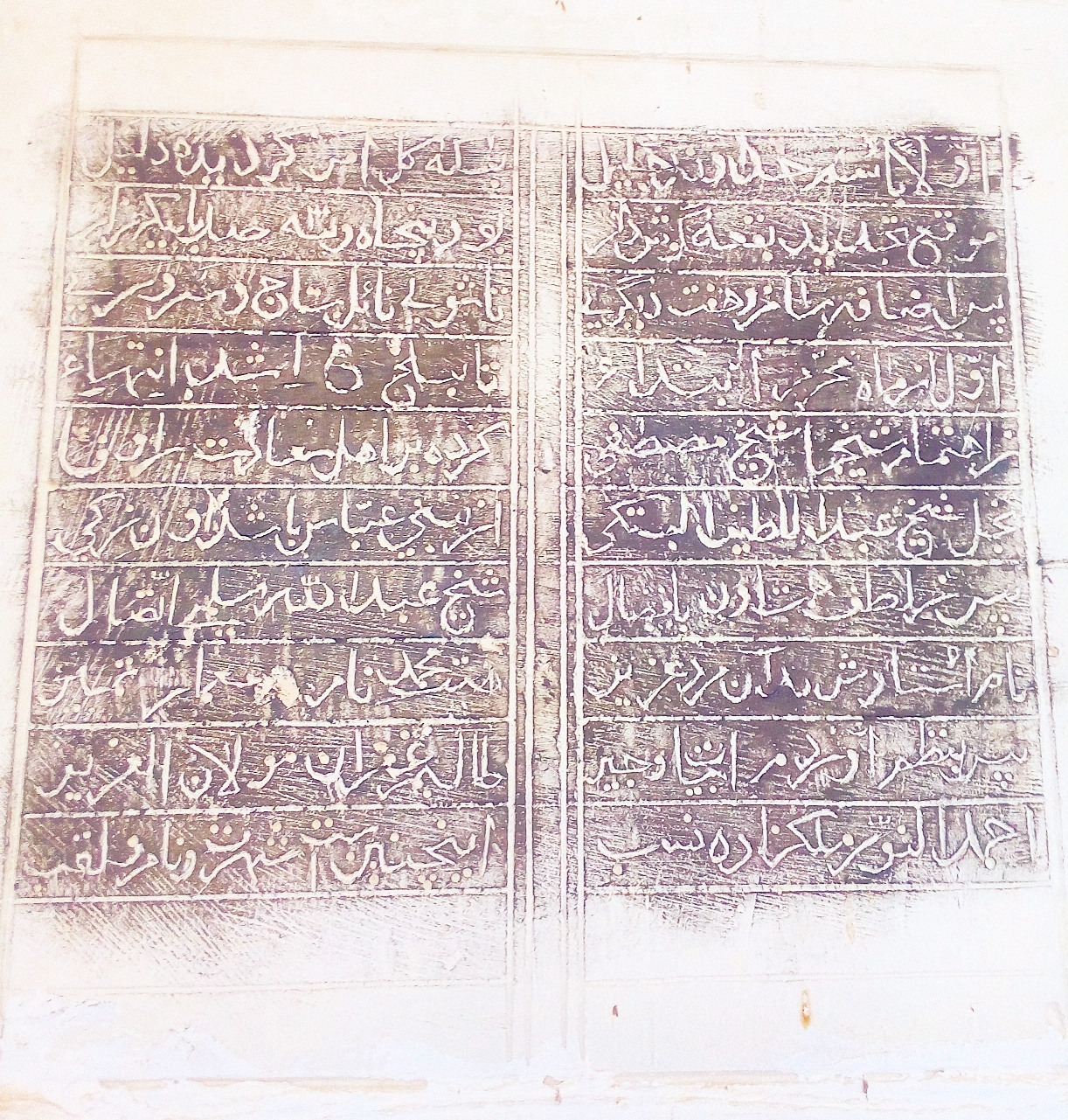
The inscription at the entrance to the tomb of Sheikh Abdul Qadir Bastaki

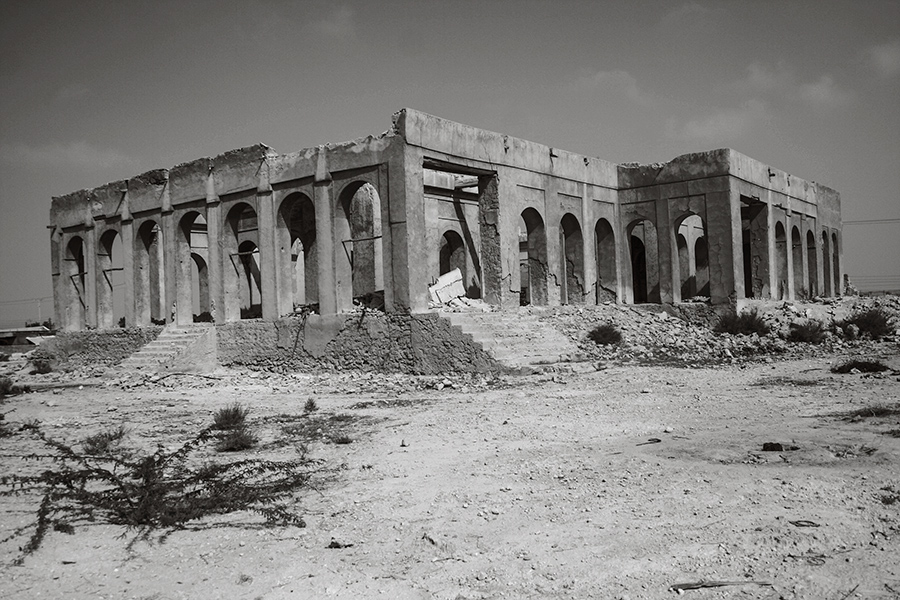
Bastaki bungalow (Banderlangeh)

Trene Sasani - photo of Trene, Kokhard district, Kokhard district

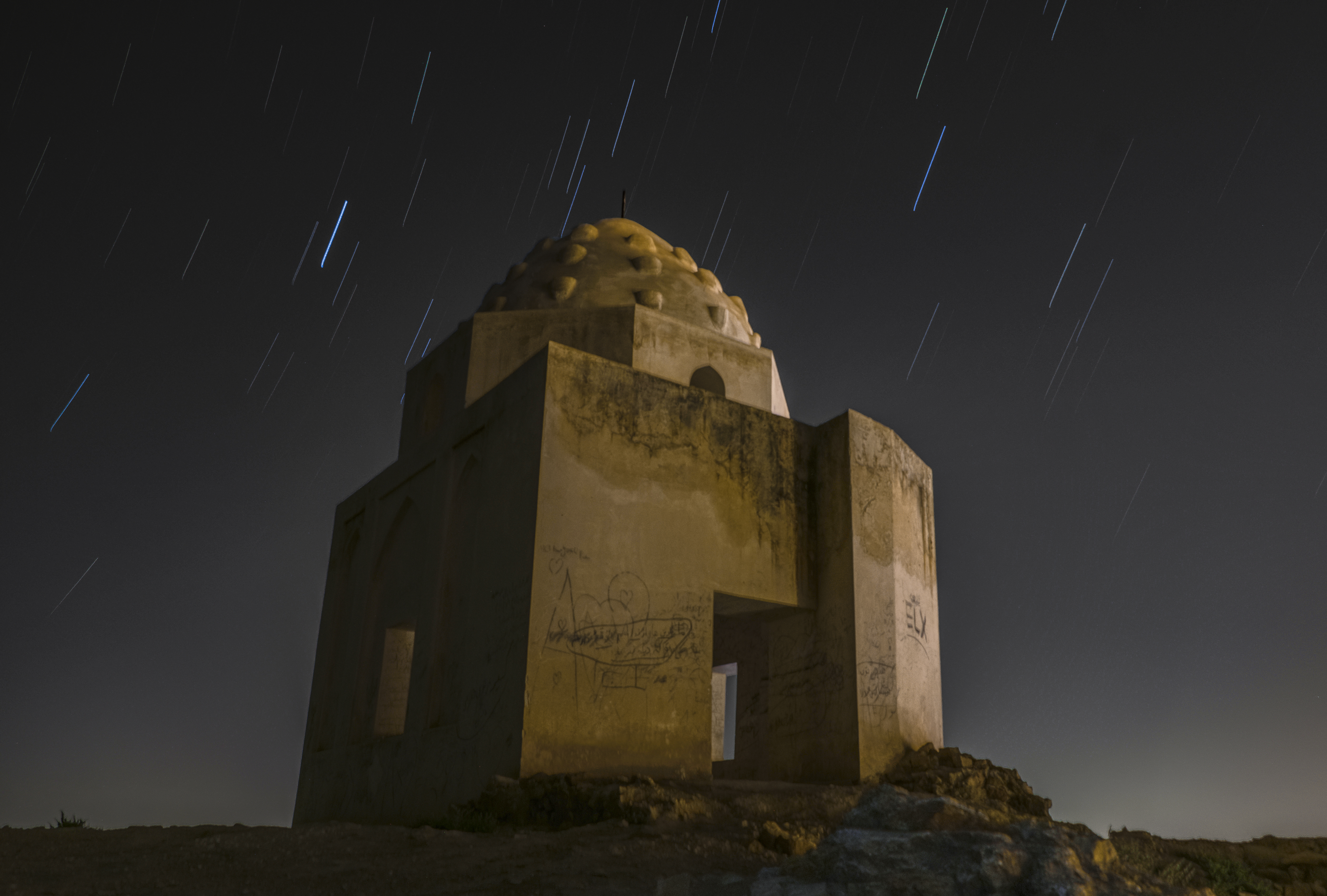
The tomb of Nader Shah's mother in Lar, Fars province, Iran

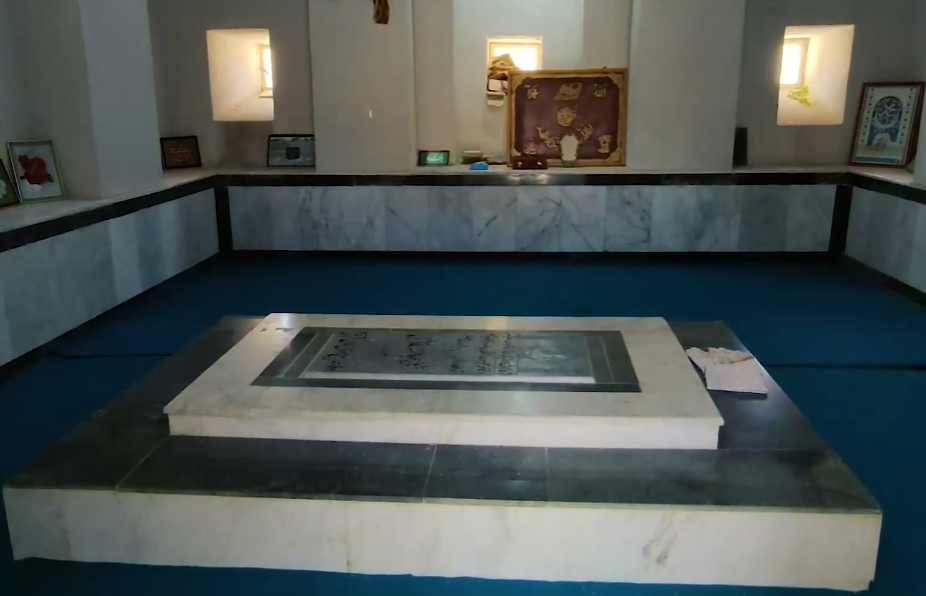
The grave of Sheikh Abdulsalam Khonji

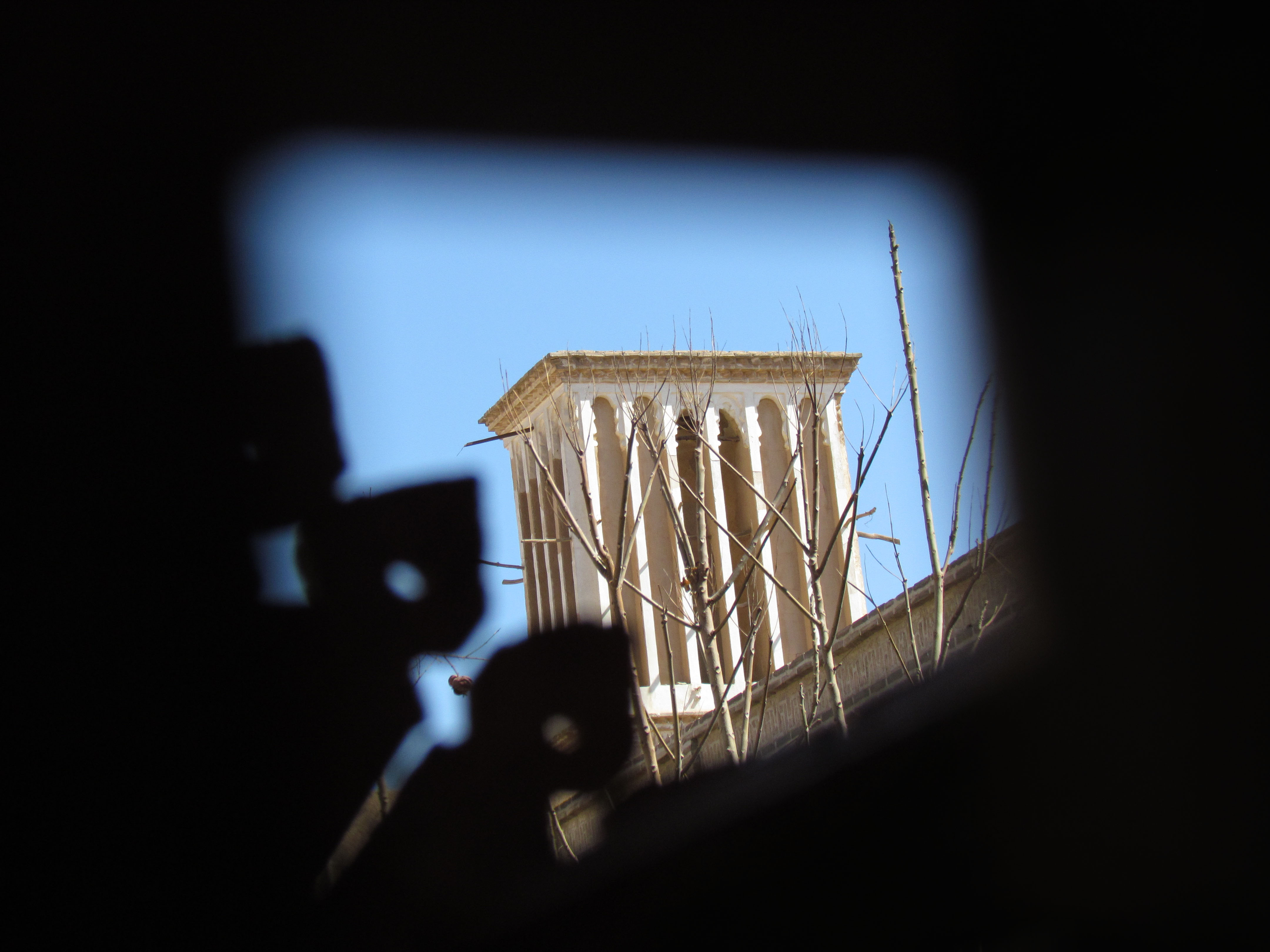
The windshield of the Laris house

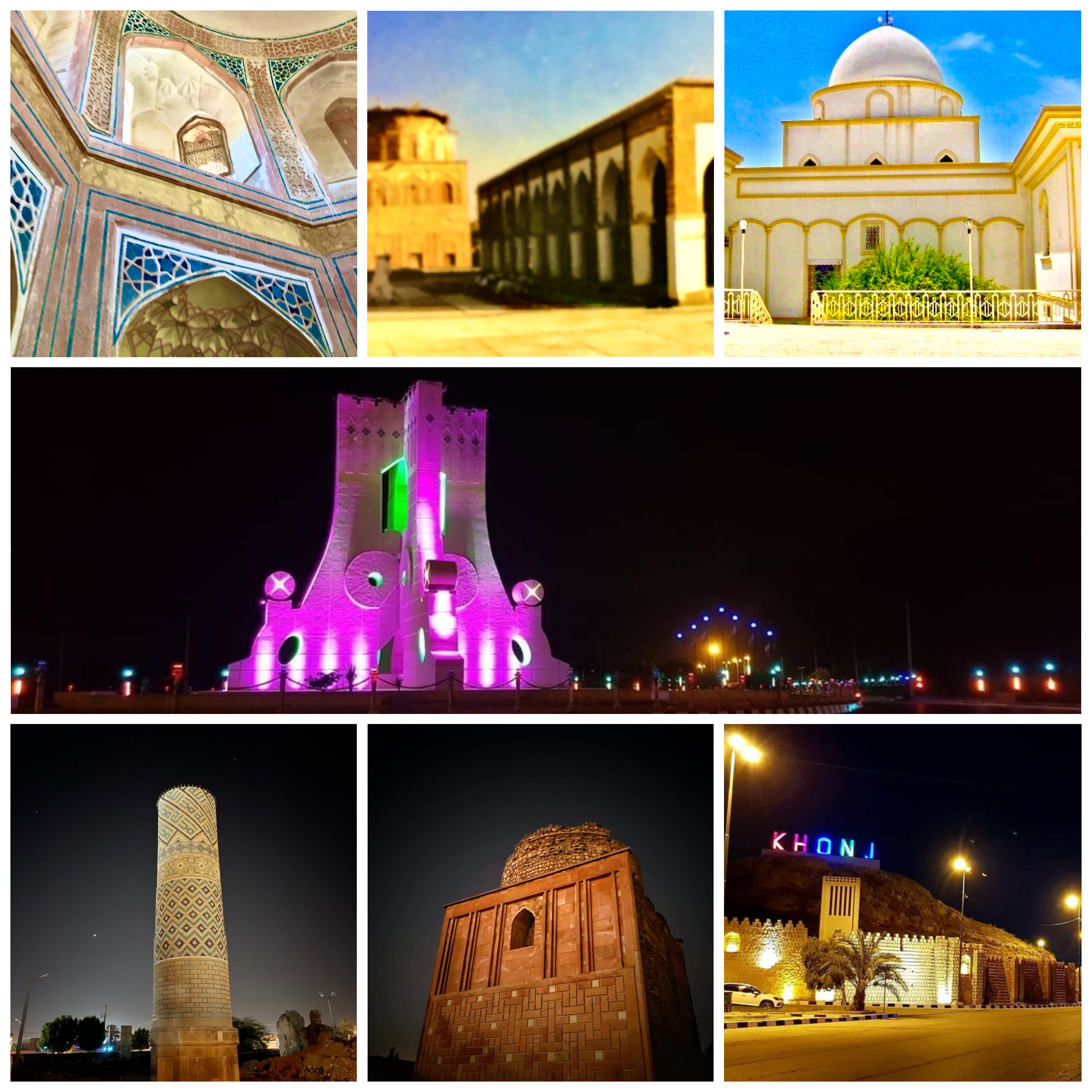
Yazd - the house of Laris

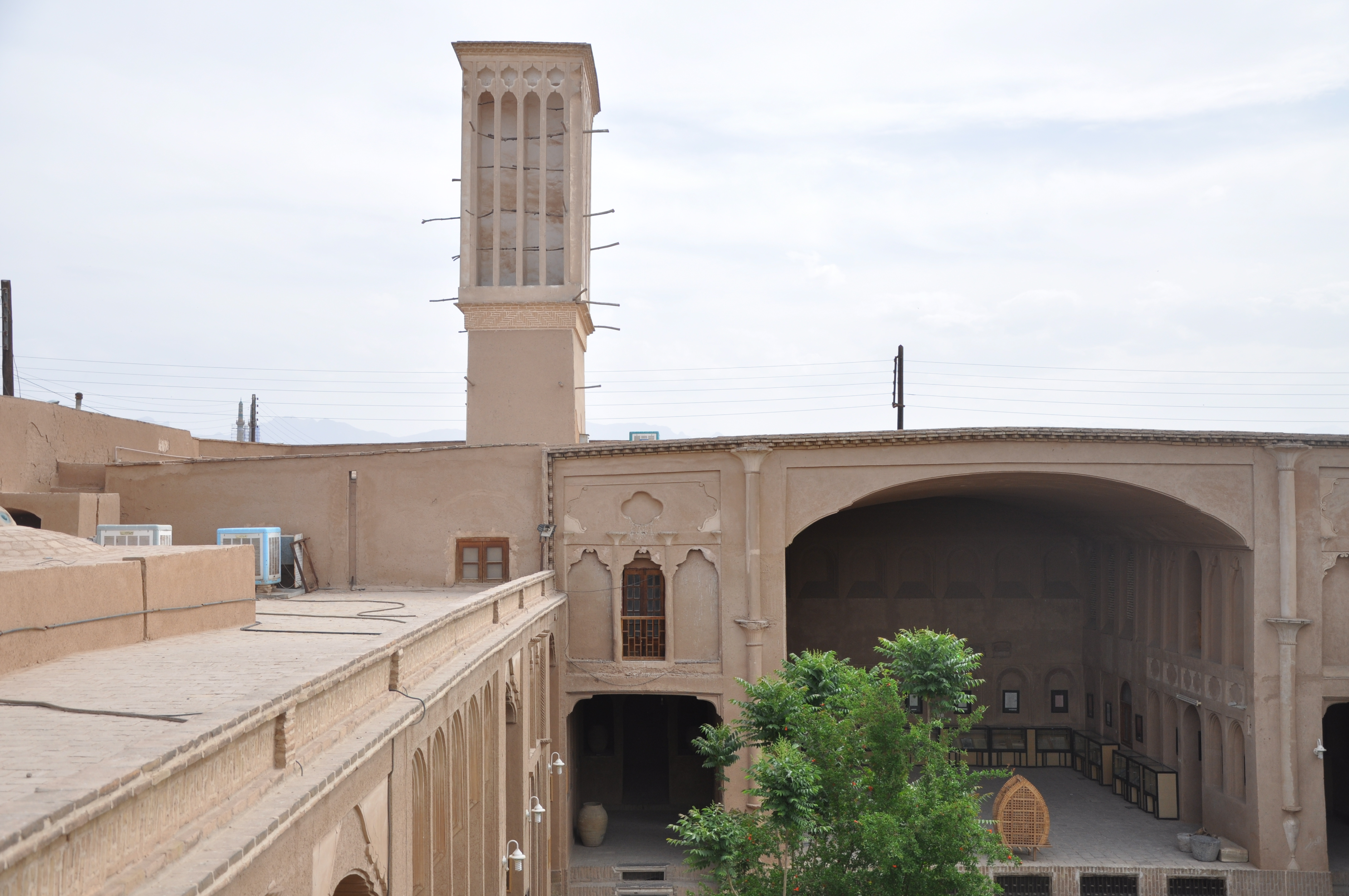
The hall and windcatcher of Laris house

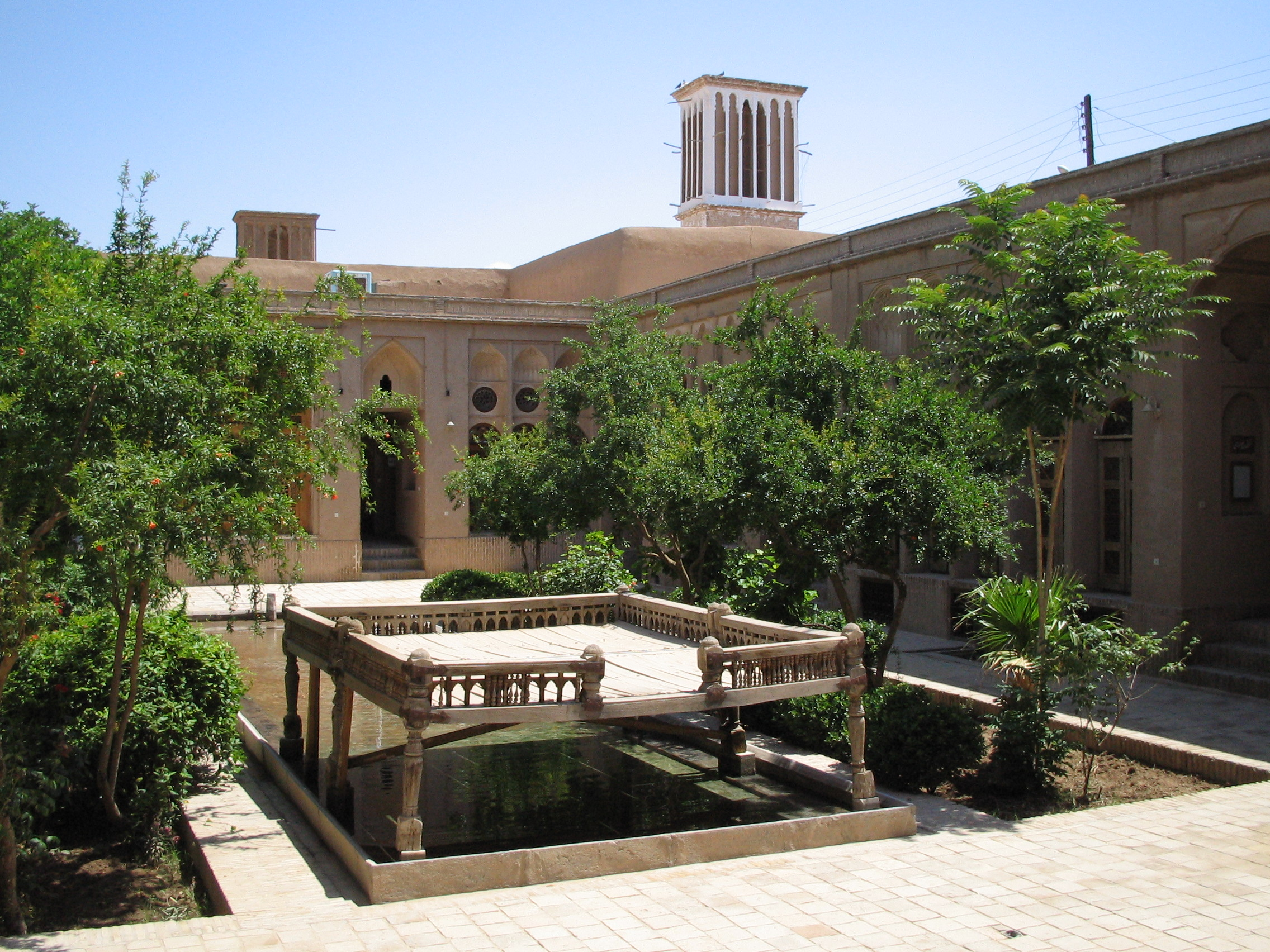
Hayat Hoz Khuneh Lari Yazd

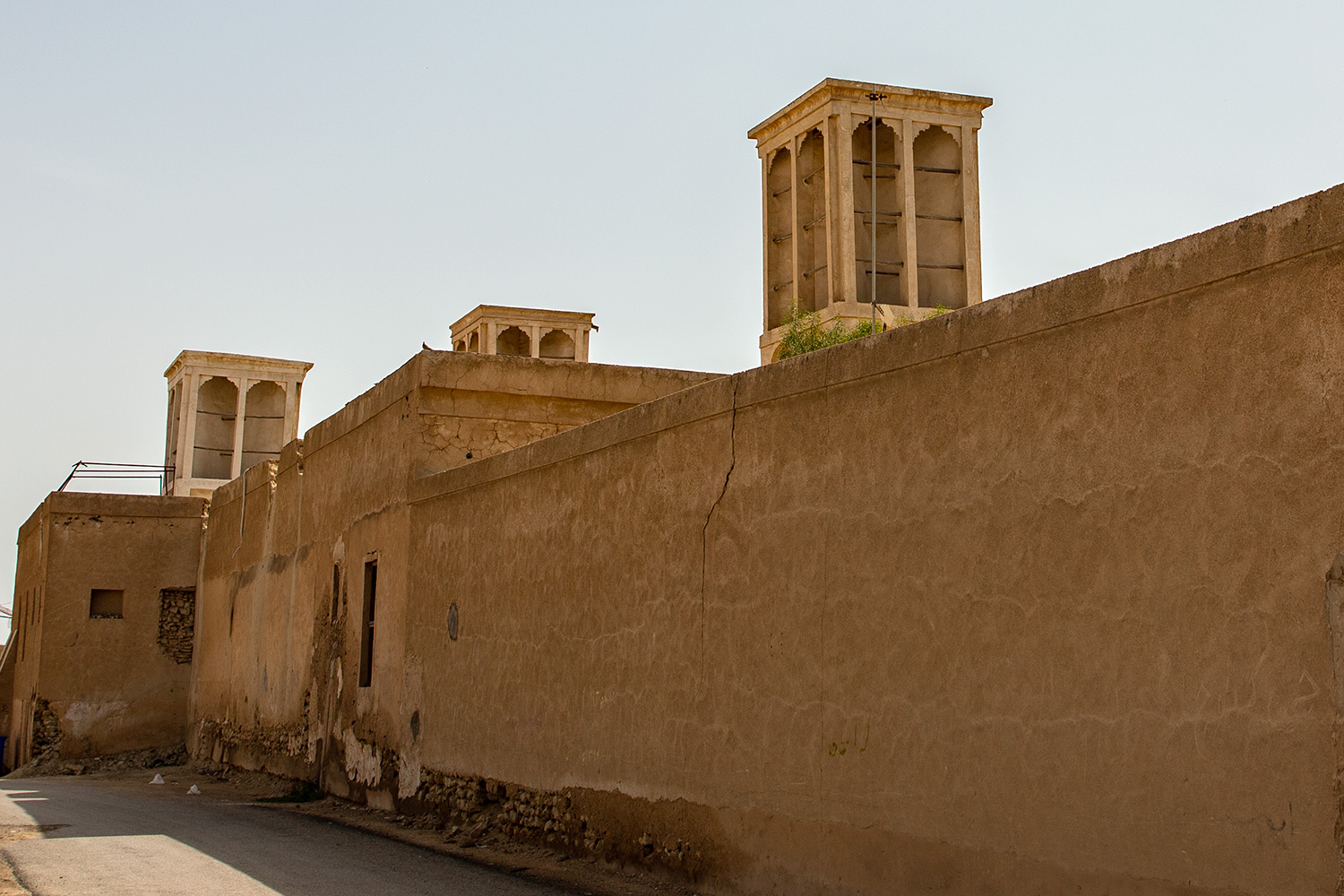
Windcatchers in Bandar Lange

== See also ==
- Lar
- Gerash
- Bastak
- Khonj
- Lamerd
- Lari people
- Lari language
