= Gari Kouh Tower =

- برج گری کوه
- Near Kouhij village in Iran

Site information
- Type: Tower

Location
- Height: 915 cm

Gari Kouh Tower (Persian: برج گری کوه, Borj-e-Gari-Kouh)} is a castle-like tower located in Kouhij village in Central District of Bastak County in west of Hormozgan Province, Iran. The tower is cited in west of Bastak as far as 40 kilometers. Height of the building is 915 cm.
