= Kashuni, Iran =

Coordinates: 27.1111°N 54.3167°E

Kashuni كاشوني
- Village
- Interactive map of Kashuni
- Country: Iran
- Province: Hormozgan
- County: Bastak
- Bakhsh: Kukherd
- Rural District: Harang

Population (2006)
  - Total: 75
- Time zone: UTC+3:30 (IRST)
  - Summer (DST): UTC+4:30 (IRDT)

Kashuni (Persian: كاشوني, also Romanized as Kāshūnī) is a village in Harang Rural District, Kukherd District, Bastak County, Hormozgan Province, Iran. At the 2006 census, its population was 75, in 14 families.
