= Jameh Mosque of Qiblah =

Mosque in Kukherd city, Hormozgan, Iran

- مسجد جامع قبله
- Location of the mosque in Iran

Religion
- Affiliation: Islam
- Ecclesiastical or organizational status: Friday mosque
- Status: Active

Location
- Location: Kukherd, Bastak County, Hormozgan
- Country: Iran
- Interactive map of Jameh Mosque of Qiblah
- Coordinates: 29°36′51″N 52°32′43″E

Architecture
- Type: Mosque architecture
- Style: Qajar
- Groundbreaking: 1310 CE
- Completed: 1313 CE
- Minaret: Two

The Jameh Mosque of Qiblah (Persian: مسجد جامع قبله, romanized: Masjed-e Qiblah; Arabic: مسجد جامع قبلة) is a mosque in Kukherd city, the capital of Kukherd District in Bastak County, in the province of Hormozgan in southern Iran. The mosque is situated to the west of the Sibah Bazaar, next to its entrance.

== See also ==
- Islam in Iran
- List of mosques in Iran
