= Chaleh, Bastak =

Chaleh چاله
- Village
- Location within Iran
- Coordinates: 27°05′03″N 54°31′18″E
- Country: Iran
- Province: Hormozgan
- County: Bastak
- Bakhsh: Kukherd
- Rural District: Kukherd

Population (2006)
  - Total: 278
- Time zone: UTC+3:30 (IRST)
  - Summer (DST): UTC+4:30 (IRDT)

Chaleh (Persian: چاله, also Romanized as Chāleh; also known as Chāleh Kūkherd) is a village in Kukherd Rural District, Kukherd District, Bastak County, Hormozgan Province, Iran. At the 2006 census, its population was 278, in 52 families.
