= Shamo =

Shamo may refer to:

== People ==
- Shamo Abbey (born 1980), Ghanaian football forward
- Shamo Quaye (1971–1997), Ghanaian football player
- Ihor Shamo, (1925–1982), Ukrainian composer

== Other ==
- Shamo (chicken), a breed of chicken of Japan which was originated in Thailand
- Shamo (manga), a Japanese action manga
- Shamo (film), a 2007 Cantonese-language action film from Hong Kong which adapts the manga
- Shamo Dam in Iran
