= Khan Bastak Castle =

Castle in Hormozgan Province, Iran

Khan Bastak castle
- قلعه خان بستک
- Interactive map of the Khan Bastak castle area

General information
- Type: Castle
- Location: Bastak County, Iran

Khan Bastak castle (Persian: قلعه خان بستک) is a historical castle located in Bastak County in Hormozgan Province, The longevity of this fortress dates back to the Qajar dynasty.
