= Mehran River =

Coordinates: 27°01′N 54°17′E

Mehran
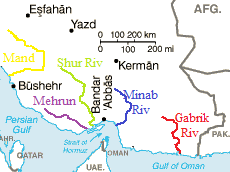
- Map of rivers in South Iran

Location
- Country: Iran
- Cities: Kookherd, Jenah, Pol Ghar, Hormozgān

Physical characteristics
- Source: Mehran River

The Mehran (Persian: رودخانه مهران) is a river in Hormozgan province in the south of Iran. It rises in the south of Fars province, and flows through the towns of Jenah and Kookherd in Hormozgan province. The Mehran terminates in a delta in the area of the Hara forests on the Khuran Strait, part of the Persian Gulf.

== See also ==
- Bastak
- Kukherd District
- Bandar Lengeh
