= Rudbar Castle =

Castle in Hormozgan Province, Iran

Rudbar castle
- قلعه رودبار

General information
- Type: Castle
- Location: Bastak County, Iran

Rudbar castle (Persian: قلعه رودبار) is a historical castle located in Bastak County in Hormozgan Province, The longevity of this fortress dates back to the Qajar dynasty.
