= Fatuyeh Castle =

Castle in Hormozgan Province, Iran

Fatuyeh castle
- قلعه فتویه

General information
- Type: Castle
- Location: Bastak County, Iran

Fatuyeh castle (Persian: قلعه فتویه) is a historical castle located in Bastak County in Hormozgan Province, The longevity of this fortress dates back to the Pre-Islamic period.
