= Kashuni =

Kashuni may refer to:

- Kashuni, Armenia, a village in Syunik Province, Armenia
- Kashuni, Iran, a village in Hormozgan Province, Iran
