= Nakh Mountain =

Nakh Mountain کوه ناخ
- Mount
- Location within Iran
- Coordinates: 27°05′14″N 54°29′30″E
- Country: Iran
- Province: Hormozgan
- County: Bastak
- Bakhsh: Kukherd

Population (2006)
  - Total: 3,144
- Time zone: UTC+3:30 (IRST)
  - Summer (DST): UTC+4:30 (IRDT)

Nakh Mountain (Persian: کوه ناخ) is a mountain in Kukherd Rural District, Kukherd District, Bastak County, Hormozgan Province in the south of Iran.

== See also ==
- Dasak Mountain
- Khe Aab Mountain
- Zeer Mountain
