= Harang Rural District =

Rural district in Hormozgan province, Iran

Harang Rural District Persian: دهستان هرنگ
- Rural District
- Location within Iran
- Coordinates: 27°05′12″N 54°25′24″E
- Country: Iran
- Province: Hormozgan
- County: Bastak
- District: Kukherdharang

Population (2016)
  - Total: 8,464
- Time zone: UTC+3:30 (IRST)

Harang Rural District (Persian: دهستان هرنگ) is in Kukherdharang District (Note: Formerly Kukherd District) of Bastak County, Hormozgan province, Iran. Its capital was the village of Harang, which merged with the village of Kukherd to become the city of Kukherdharang.

== Demographics ==
=== Population ===
At the time of the 2006 National Census, the rural district's population was 7,251 in 1,469 households. There were 8,855 inhabitants in 2,065 households at the following census of 2011. The 2016 census measured the population of the rural district as 8,464 in 2,151 households. The most populous of its seven villages was Harang, with 4,564 people.
