= Morbagh =

Morbagh مرباغ
- Village
- Location within Iran
- Coordinates: 26°50′25″N 53°49′33″E
- Country: Iran
- Province: Hormozgan
- County: Bandar Lengeh
- Bakhsh: Shibkaveh
- Rural District: Moqam

Population (2006)
  - Total: 543
- Time zone: UTC+3:30 (IRST)
  - Summer (DST): UTC+4:30 (IRDT)

Morbagh (Persian: مرباغ, also Romanized as Morbāgh; also known as Marbakh and Morbakh) is a village in Moqam Rural District, Shibkaveh District, Bandar Lengeh County, Hormozgan province, Iran. At the 2006 census, its population was 543, in 97 families.
