= Moghuyeh =

Village in Hormozgan province, Iran

Moghuyeh Persian: مغويه
- Village
- Location within Iran
- Coordinates: 26°36′15″N 54°30′32″E
- Country: Iran
- Province: Hormozgan
- County: Bandar Lengeh
- District: Central
- Rural District: Moghuyeh

Population (2016)
  - Total: 1,125
- Time zone: UTC+3:30 (IRST)

Moghuyeh (Persian: مغويه) (Note: Also romanized as Moghūyeh; also known as Bandar-e Moghūyeh) is a village in, and the capital of, Moghuyeh Rural District of the Central District of Bandar Lengeh County, Hormozgan province, Iran.

== Demographics ==
=== Population ===
At the time of the 2006 National Census, the village's population was 1,032 in 194 households. The following census in 2011 counted 964 people in 227 households. The 2016 census measured the population of the village as 1,125 people in 252 households.
