= Paraw Kukherd =

Paraw Kukherd — Qanat Paraw پاراو کوخرد
- Archaeological site
- Country: Iran
- Province: Hormozgan
- County: Bastak
- Bakhsh: Kukherd
- Time zone: UTC+3:30 (IRST)
  - Summer (DST): UTC+4:30 (IRDT)

Paraw Kukherd (from Arabic: باراو كوخرد, in Persian: پاراو کوخرد is a water management system used.

The Paraw Kukherd Qanat structures and ruins are located in the Kukherd District (Persian: بخش كوخرد), in Hormozgan Province. They are under the administration of the city of kukherd In Bastak County.

The Paraw Kukherd are an archaeological site of Sasanian architecture.

== Technical features ==
Qanats are constructed as a series of well-like vertical shafts, connected by gently sloping tunnels. Qanats tap into subterranean water in a manner that efficiently delivers large quantities of water to the surface without need for pumping. The water drains relying on gravity, with the destination lower than the source, which is typically an upland aquifer. Qanats allow water to be transported over long distances in hot dry climates without losing a large proportion of the water to seepage and evaporation.

== Impact of qanats on settlement patterns ==
A typical town or city in Iran and elsewhere where the qanat is used has more than one qanat. Fields and gardens are located both over the qanats a short distance before they emerge from the ground and after the surface outlet. Water from the qanats defines both the social regions in the city and the layout of the city.

The water is freshest, cleanest, and coolest in the upper reaches and more prosperous people live at the outlet or immediately upstream of the outlet. When the qanat is still below grade, the water is drawn to the surface via water wells or animal driven Persian wells. Private subterranean reservoirs could supply houses and buildings for domestic use and garden irrigation as well. Further, air flow from the qanat is used to cool an underground summer room (shabestan) found in many older houses and buildings.

== See also ==
- Terenah
- Siba Castle
- Two domes of Kukherd
- Sasanian Empire
