= Siba Castle =

Castle in Iran

Castle of Siba Kukherd قلعه سيبه كوخرد
- Archaeological site
- Interactive map of Castle of Siba Kukherd
- Country: Iran
- Province: Hormozgan
- County: Bastak
- Bakhsh: Kukherd
- Time zone: UTC+3:30 (IRST)
  - Summer (DST): UTC+4:30 (IRDT)

The Castle of Siba (Persian: قلعه سیبه), Siba castle is one of the most remarkable examples of fortified structures surrounded by trench in Kukherd District, Hormozgan province in south Iran.

== Location ==
Siba castle was a squared fortified structure 1000 from Kukherd and on a hill above the palm oasis south-west of Kukherd, which added remarkably to its altitude and height. The length of its interface from the south is about 114 metres, while its southern interface extends over 112.5 metres. The structure was near the monuments of ancient bath of Siba.

== History ==
The history of Siba castle goes back to the Sasanian era (226–651 CE). It was the center of government of that area. It acted as fortified military base for some time and was surrounded by a huge trench for protection. A trench was an ancient defensive strategic feature to defend the cities, castles and the forts in Persia before the Islamic era.

This gigantic structure was considered a traditional defensive ancient landmark like other landmarks at that time such as huge city gates, cellars, security tunnels and underground military storages. The Castle of Siba was maintained until 1163–1192. It was destroyed by an earthquake in Kukherd and then by a flood in 1367 which destroyed the rest of the castle.

- Bastak
- Bandar Lengeh
- Hormozgān
- Castle
- AL madani
- Paraw Kukherd
- The Historic Bath of Siba
- Sassanid family tree – of the Sasanian (Sassanid) dynasty
