= The Historic Bath of Siba =

Archaeological site in Iran

Coordinates: 27.0512°N 54.2927°E

Historical Bath of Siba – Hamam Sibah حمام سیبه كوخرد
- Archaeological site
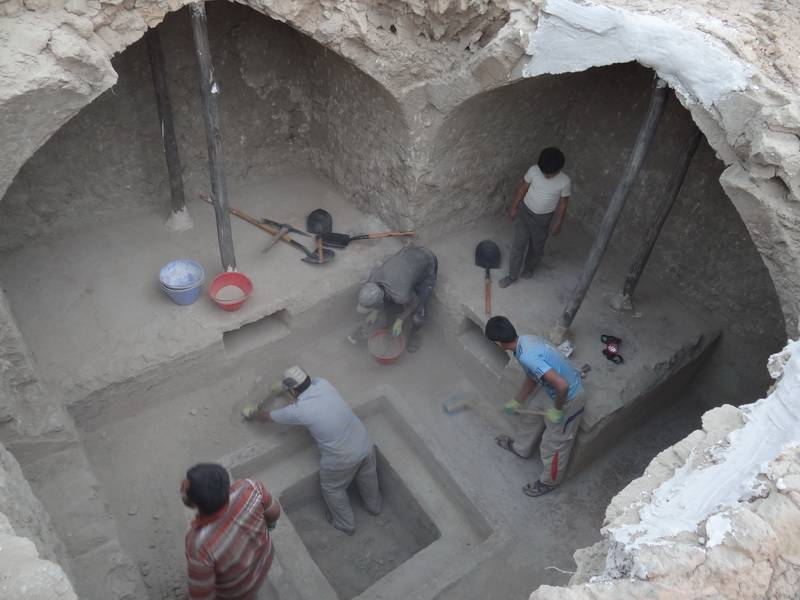
- Bath of siba 2011.2 Bath of Siba
- Interactive map of Historical Bath of Siba – Hamam Sibah
- Country: Iran
- Province: Hormozgan
- County: Bastak
- Bakhsh: Kukherd
- Time zone: UTC+3:30 (IRST)
  - Summer (DST): UTC+4:30 (IRDT)

The Historical Bath of Siba (Persian: حمام سیبه, romanized: Hamam-e Sibah), is a historical bathing complex of the ancient Sasanian Empire, located in present-day southern Iran near the Strait of Hormuz.

== Geography ==
The Historical Bath of Siba structures and ruins are located in the Kukherd District (Persian: بخش كوخرد), in Hormozgan province. They are under the administration of the city of Bastak.

The ancient baths are an archaeological site of Sasanian architecture. Modern public baths nearby use the same reportedly healing waters.

== History ==
The public baths were built at natural hot springs, during the Sasanian era (224– 651 CE). Ancient Sasanians built public baths to serve as rest centers. The baths served government officials, merchants from nearby sea ports and desert caravan routes, and the public.

=== Healing baths ===
Some of the baths had practitioners who offered healing treatments, using medicinal herbs and essential oils. These ointments were generally used for relieving joint pain and treating skin diseases.

The baths were known as the 'dumb doctor' because healers also treated patients silently with its healing hot spring waters.

== See also ==
- Paraw Kukherd
- Castle of Siba
- Sasanian family tree – of the Sasanian dynasty
