= Kukherdharang =

City in Hormozgan province, Iran

Kukherdharang Persian: كوخردهرنگ
- City
- Location within Iran
- Coordinates: 27°05′43″N 54°28′24″E
- Country: Iran
- Province: Hormozgan
- County: Bastak
- District: Kukherdharang

Population (2016)
  - Total: 4,390
- Time zone: UTC+3:30 (IRST)

Kukherdharang (Persian: کوخردهرنگ) (Note: Formerly the village of Kukherd (كوخرد), also romanized as Kookherd, Kūkherd, and Kuhkhird; also known as Chāleh Kūkherd) is a city in, and the capital of Kukherdharang District of Bastak County, Hormozgan province, Iran. It is also the administrative center for Kukherd Rural District. Kukherd was traditionally part of the region of Larestan. Kukherd's inhabitants are Larestani people.

== History and etymology ==
Kukherd civilization is ancient, going back more than 2,000 years. Evidence of the ancient archeology includes monuments that have been found dating to the Sassanid dynasty. This is in addition to having old tombs and having its unique architecture like the Windcatcher Bâdgir بادگیر Kukherd in Persian consists originally of two old Persian words: “koy كوي” and “kherd”. خرد In the لغت نامه Loghatnaameh Dictionary , “koy” means alive and "kherd" means reason which can be translated to "The land of reason".

== Demographics ==
=== Population ===
At the time of the 2006 National Census, the population (as the village of Kukherd in Kukherd Rural District) was 3,144 people in 637 households. The following census in 2011 counted 3,839 people in 1,023 households. The 2016 census measured the population of the village as 4,390 people in 1,196 households. It was the most populous village in its rural district.

After the census, the village of Kukherd, following its merger with the village of Harang, was elevated to city status as Kukherdharang.

== Historical sites ==
Among notable ancient monuments that have been discovered in Kukherd are:

- Bazaar of Siba
- Castle of Aamaj
- Castle of Siba – maintained until 1163–1192 CE. It was destroyed by an earthquake in Kukherd city, and was affected by the flood in 1367, which destroyed the remainder of the castle.
- Castle of Tawseelah – in Geri zamerdan valley.
- Historic Bath of Siba – an ancient bath house that is believed to date from the Sassanid dynasty.
- Jameh Mosque of Qiblah (مسجد جامع قبلة) – a mosque that dates from the ninth century AH.
- Terenah:, (terenah ترنه ) – the unique ancient methods of ancient Kukherd population have been using to transfer the sweet water from Mehran salty river to the other bank of the river order to water their lands.

== Kukherd in the Cambridge History of Iran ==
An early reference to Kukherd is dated to 1649, this is found in the Cambridge History of Iran, Volume 6th:

Went north from Kung through Kuhkird, Bastak and Nimar, where it joined the main route at Lar, From the lesser Ports at Bandar Rig and Bandar Rishahr routes converged near Burazgan and the road to Shiraz Passed through Dalaki, Kazarun and the Dasht_i Arjan, These routes Were subject to extraordinary variations in climatic conditions, scorching heat when only traveling at night was bearable and Perishing cold when travel might be impossible, An English factor, Robert Loftus, noted in April 1628, I stayed in Digerdoo” Dihgirdu” six daies until….

== See also ==
- Al Madani
- The Historic Bath of Siba
