= Bastak =

City in Hormozgan province, Iran

Bastak Persian: بستک
- City
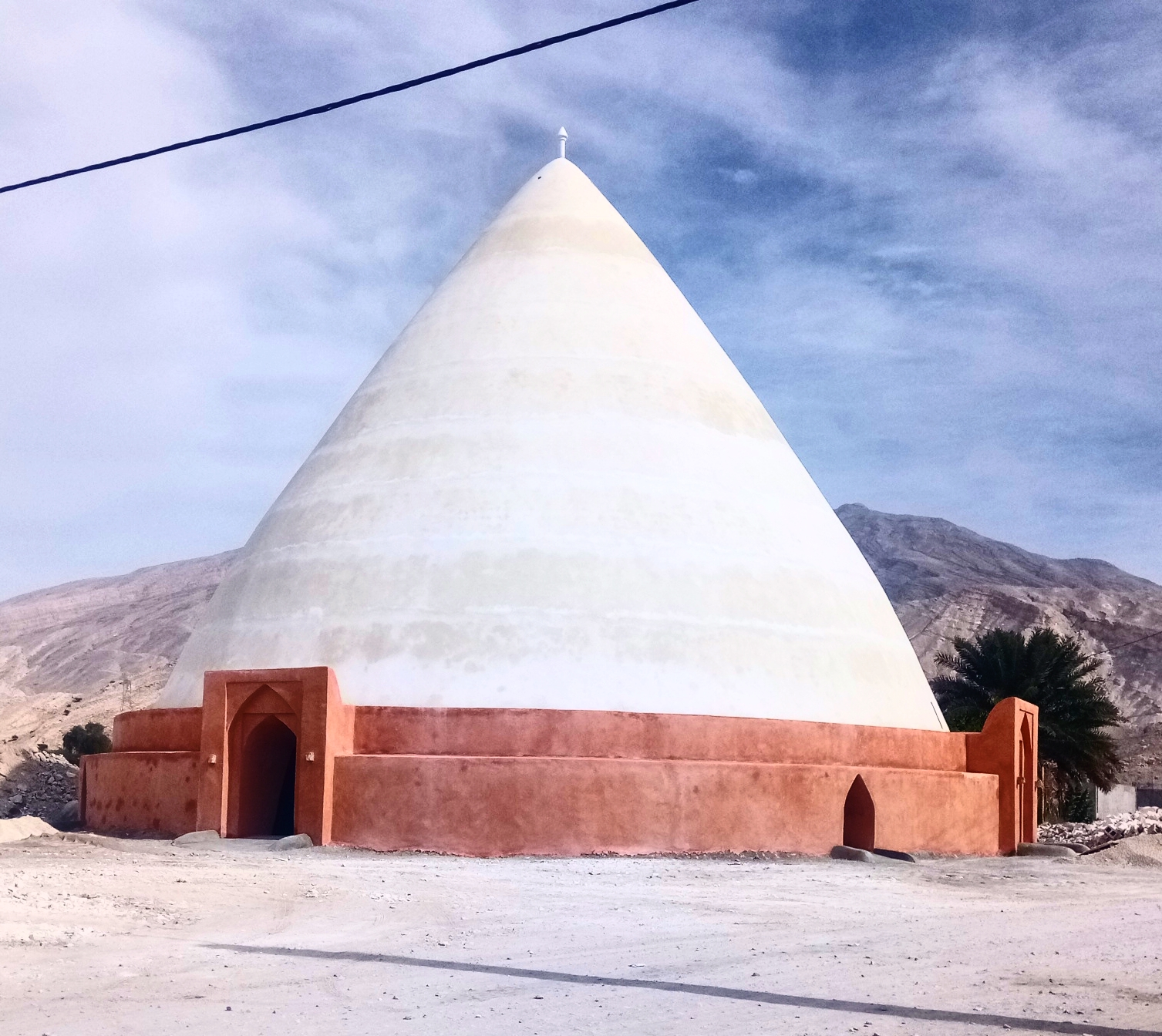
- Sheikh Reservoir

- Location within Iran
- Coordinates: 27°11′43″N 54°22′04″E
- Country: Iran
- Province: Hormozgan
- County: Bastak
- District: Central

Population (2016)
  - Total: 9,959
- Time zone: UTC+3:30 (IRST)

Bastak (Persian: بستک) is a city in the Central District of Bastak County, Hormozgan province, Iran, serving as capital of both the county and the district. Bastak was traditionally part of the region of Irahistan.

== Demographics ==
=== Population ===
At the time of the 2006 National Census, the city's population was 8,376 individuals in 1,765 households. The following census in 2011 counted 9,225 people in 2,133 households. The 2016 census measured the population of the city as 9,959 people in 2,661 households.

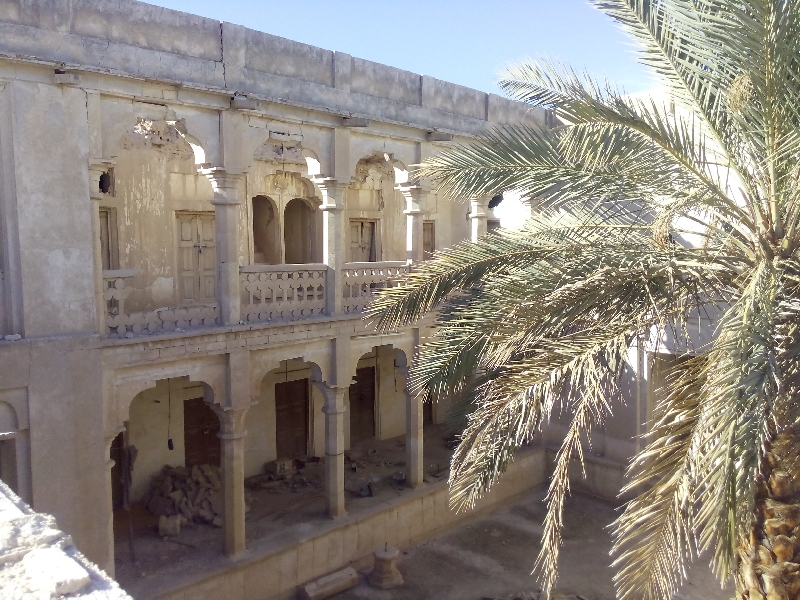
Kazim's historical house

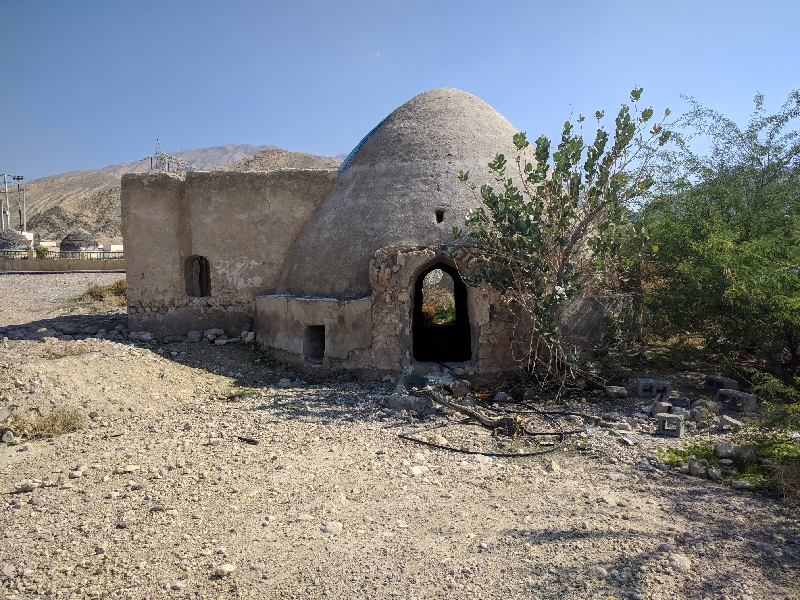
Alfath khan historical cistern

== See also ==
- Achomi people
- Evaz
- Media related to Bastak at Wikimedia Commons
