= Kukherd Rural District =

Rural district in Hormozgan province, Iran

Kukherd Rural District Persian: دهستان کوخرد
- Rural District
- Location within Iran
- Coordinates: 27°03′13″N 54°39′04″E
- Country: Iran
- Province: Hormozgan
- County: Bastak
- District: Kukherdharang
- Capital: Kukherdharang

Population (2016)
  - Total: 8,264
- Time zone: UTC+3:30 (IRST)

Kukherd Rural District (Persian: دهستان کوخرد) is in Kukherdharang District (Note: Formerly Kukherd District) of Bastak County, Hormozgan province, Iran. It is administered from the city of Kukherdharang. (Note: Formerly the village of Kukherd)

== Demographics ==
=== Population ===
At the time of the 2006 National Census, the rural district's population was 5,950 in 1,206 households. There were 7,356 inhabitants in 1,870 households at the following census of 2011. The 2016 census measured the population of the rural district as 8,264 in 2,313 households. The most populous of its 21 villages was Kukherd (now the city of Kukherdharang), with 4,390 people.
