= Kukherdharang District =

District in Hormozgan province, Iran

Kukherdharang District Persian: بخش كوخردهرنگ
- District
- Location within Iran
- Coordinates: 27°03′13″N 54°35′55″E
- Country: Iran
- Province: Hormozgan
- County: Bastak
- Capital: Kukherdharang

Population (2016)
  - Total: 16,728
- Time zone: UTC+3:30 (IRST)

Kukherdharang District (Persian: بخش كوخردهرنگ) (Note: Formerly Kukherd District (بخش كوخرد)) is in Bastak County, Hormozgan province, Iran. Its capital is the city of Kukherdharang.

== History ==
After the 2016 National Census, the village of Kukherd was elevated to city status as Kukherdharang.

== Demographics ==
=== Population ===
At the time of the 2006 census, the district's population was 13,201 in 2,675 households. The following census in 2011 counted 16,211 people in 3,935 households. The 2016 census measured the population of the district as 16,728 inhabitants in 4,464 households.

=== Administrative divisions ===
Kukherdharang District Population
Administrative Divisions	2006	2011	2016
Harang RD	7,251	8,855	8,464
Kuherd RD	5,950	7,356	8,264
Kukherdharang (city) (Note: Formerly Kukherd, became a city after the 2016 census)			
Total	13,201	16,211	16,728
RD = Rural District

== Dams in Kukherd District ==
- Bust-e gez Dam
- Buz Dam
- Jaber Dam
- Jawid Dam
- Shamo Dam

== See also ==
- Zeer Mountain
- Dasak Mountain
- Khe Aab Mountain
- Nakh Mountain
- Castle of Siba
- Castle of Tawseelah
- Paraw Kukherd
- The Historic Bath of Siba
- Sassanid family tree — of the Sasanian (Sassanid) dynasty
