= Bastak County =

County in Hormozgan province, Iran

Bastak County Persian: شهرستان بستک
- County
- Location of Bastak County in Hormozgan province (left, pink)

- Location of Hormozgan province in Iran
- Coordinates: 27°13′N 54°35′E
- Country: Iran
- Province: Hormozgan
- Capital: Bastak
- Districts: Central, Jenah, Kukherd

Area
  - Total: 5,557 km^{2} (2,146 sq mi)

Population (2016)
  - Total: 80,492
  - Density: 14.48/km^{2} (37.52/sq mi)
- Time zone: UTC+3:30 (IRST)

Bastak County (Persian: شهرستان بستک) is in Hormozgan province, Iran. Its capital is the city of Bastak.

== History ==
After the 2016 National Census, the villages of Henguiyeh, Kuhij, and Kukherdharang were elevated to city status.

== Demographics ==
=== Language ===
Bastak was traditionally part of the region of Irahistan. Bastak's inhabitants are Sunni Muslim and speak Achomi (Larestani) language. The Bastaki accent of Achomi language is very similar to the Khonji, Gerashi and Fedaghi and Evazi and other regional accents.

=== Population ===
At the time of the 2006 census, the county's population was 65,716 in 13,563 households. The following census in 2011 counted 80,119 people in 18,780 households. The 2016 census measured the population of the county as 80,492 in 21,684 households.

=== Administrative divisions ===
Bastak County's population history and administrative structure over three consecutive censuses are shown in the following table.

Bastak County Population
Administrative Divisions	2006	2011	2016
Central District	30,399	36,498	40,174
Dehtal RD	6,558	8,433	8,119
Fatuiyeh RD	7,486	9,265	12,497
Gudeh RD	7,979	9,575	9,599
Bastak (city)	8,376	9,225	9,959
Kuhij (city) (Note: Became a city after the 2016 census)			
Jenah District	22,116	27,410	23,574
Faramarzan RD	10,720	12,594	12,729
Jenah RD	5,760	7,647	3,935
Henguiyeh (city) (Note: Became a city after the 2016 census)			
Jenah (city)	5,636	7,169	6,910
Kukherdharang District (Note: Formerly Kukherd District)	13,201	16,211	16,728
Harang RD	7,251	8,855	8,464
Kukherd RD	5,950	7,356	8,264
Kukherdharang (city) (Note: Formerly the village of Kukherd; became a city after the 2016 census)			
Total	65,716	80,119	80,492
RD = Rural District

== See also ==
- Azdi Bastak
- Larestan
- Khonj County
- Gerash County
- Lamerd County
- Evaz

Media related to Bastak County at Wikimedia Commons
