= Hanan Redha =

Bahraini singer

- حنان رضا
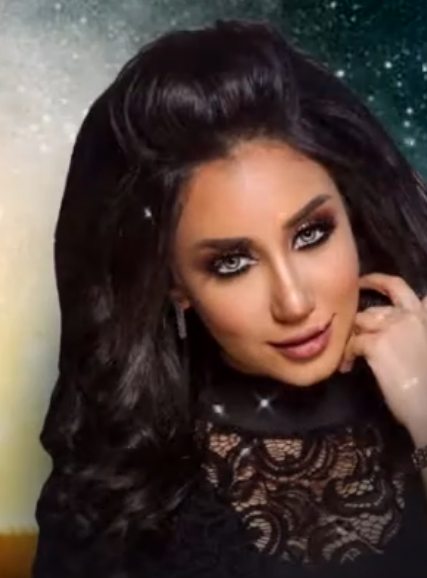
- Born: August 23, 1991 (age 35); Bahrain
- Other name: The voice of Bahrain
- Occupation: Singer
- Years active: 2013—present

Hanan Redha (Arabic: حنان رضا, born on August 23, 1991) is a Bahraini singer and actor, most prominently known for her contributions to Khaleeji music, she sang in various Arabic dialects, including Gulf Arabic (Bahraini, Iraqi), Moroccan Arabic, and Egyptian. Her fan nickname is صوت البحرين (the voice of Bahrain).

== Personal life ==
Hanan Redha was born in Bahrain on August 23, 1991. She studied in Bahraini schools but has also lived in Kuwait, and joined the Higher Institute of Musical Arts, where she earned a Bachelor of Arts in Music with a specialization in vocals. She also plays the piano.

=== Controversies ===
In 2016, on her tour in Kuwait, she had to move from a hotel room she claimed was haunted.

== Career ==
Redha began her career in 2013, following her participation in Arab Idol, and the renowned regional variety show "Sout Al-Sahari" (The Voice of the Nights) as well as acting in مواطن قليل الدسم (Low-Fat Citizen), a play directed by actress Shatha Sabt.

In 2013, among the numerous photos shared on online forums featuring the banquet hosted by Arab Idol contestant Ziad Khoury for the show's participants, one image of Bahraini contestant Hana Redha captured significant attention. The photo, taken at the picturesque location where the banquet was held, showcased Hanan against the enchanting backdrop of Lebanon's natural beauty. This striking image earned her the nickname "Spring Star" (Arabic: نجمة الربيع) from forum members.

In 2014, Redha released a song titled "Na’im Bel Asal" (Arabic: نايم بالعسل, lit. 'Sleeping in Honey'), written by Mohammad Al-Shuraida and composed by Turki Al-Fassam, with arrangement by Ahmad Fouad.

In late 2015, her single "سَمّوا عليه" ("say Bismillah for him/her" or "bless him/her"), written by poet Abdulaziz Al-Abkal and composed by Jassem Al-Bahbahani, became a massive hit in the Arabic states of the Persian Gulf, featuring a video that scored over 20 million views on YouTube.

In 2016, Hanan Redha's rise to stardom began with the Iraqi singer and composer Abdullah Al-Hameem in the duet music video "Ne'mat Allah" (Arabic: نعمة الله, lit. 'The Blessing of God'). The song was written by Mohammad Al-Jubouri, composed by Abdullah Al-Hemaim, and arranged by Hossam Al-Deen, and has achieved 67 million views on YouTube. She later moved to Kuwait, where she performed numerous concerts.

At the end of 2016, she released لف ودور (Arabic: لف و دور, lit. 'Turning and Turning'), accompanied by a music video. The song was written and composed by Abdulaziz Al-Abkal and achieved significant success, reaching around 1 million views within four months.

Additionally, in 2016, she released several other songs, including "Ya Kuwait" (Arabic: يا كويت, lit. 'Ya Kuwait'), composed by Dr. Yaqoub Al-Khubaisi; "Esma’ni" (Listen to Me), written by Sahm and composed by Ammar Janahi; "Al-Hal Al-Sa’ab" (The Difficult Solution); and "Keda" (Like This).

In 2017, Redha released the Moroccan Arabic song "Shifti Ana" (Arabic: شفتي انا, lit. 'You Saw Me') written by Mus’ab Al-Anzi, composed by Redouan Al-Diri, and arranged by Jalal Hamdawi. The following year, she released two songs: "Sheno Mushtaq" (What Are You Longing For?), written by Humam Al-Aseer, composed by Humam Hassan, and arranged by Ammar Adnan; and "Halti Sa’ba" (My Condition is Hard), written by Abdulsalam Mohammad, composed by Mishari Al-Yateem, and arranged by Taif Adel.

In 2020, Hanan Redha released the song "Jaf Al-Kalam" (Arabic: جف الكلام, lit. 'Words Dried Up'), written by Mishari Al-Hadaibi, composed by Mohammad Anwar, and arranged by Ahmad Fouad.

In 2023, she released her Egyptian Arabic song "Ma Yestahelsh" (Arabic: مايستاهلش, lit. 'He Doesn't Deserve').

== See also ==
- Ahllam
- Hind Al-Bahriniya
- Ali Bahar
- Sultaneez
