= Khaliji (music) =

Arabian music genre

Khaliji or Khaleeji music (Arabic: الموسيقى الخليجية, romanized: al-mūsīqā al-khalījiyya, meaning "Gulf music") is the music of Eastern Arabia and the Arab states of the Persian Gulf, and it is a popular genre across the Arab world. It is traditionally characterized by heavy use of the rebab, oud and other string instruments such as the violin, the occasional use of habbān, and the inclusion of percussion instruments such as the mirwas, tabl, and duff drums. Khaliji music first started as a bedouin tradition with poetry sung by a tribe's shāʿir ("poet"), usually accompanied by a rebab, the lyrics dealt with tales of honor, love, camel riders, and glory warriors.

Khaliji music has roots going back more than 1,000 years, to the Islamic period, under the Umayyads in Damascus, Syria and the Abbasids in Baghdad, Iraq. In the modern era, Kuwaitis were the first commercial recording artists and composers in the Persian Gulf region; Iraq, Kuwait and Saudi Arabia pioneered the Khaliji genre into its modern form in the second half of the 20th century and soon became the focal point of the industry, but in recent years the UAE has increased its impact on the Khaliji genre. The Khaliji scene mainly consists of Iraqi, Emirati, Kuwaiti, Bahraini, and Saudi artists today. Along with its main Arabian style, Khaliji music can also sometimes incorporate a few elements of East African along with Arabian genres such as Liwa, Moradah, and Sawt reflecting the region's ethnic history.

The period between 1980s and mid 2000, saw a lot of local Khaleeji/Bandari bands singing in mixed Khaleeji and Bandari style in both Persian and Arabic (southern/gulf dialects), most notable among these being the Bahraini Sultanies band and the Kuwaiti Miami band, among others. This Persian Arabic mixed Khaleeji style has been reintroduced, modernized and continued by modern younger artists such as Emirati singer Ahllam.

In recent years, a new Independent scene has started to emerge in Arab states of the Persian Gulf that aims to challenge the sociocultural norms of modern Khaleeji society through a sound that's distinct from traditional Khaliji music, the scene has been coined as "Alternative Khaliji" by Kuwaiti-American musician +Aziz.

== List of notable Khaliji singers ==
=== Eastern Arabia ===
==== Bahrain ====
- Hala Al-Turk
- Hanan Redha
- Hind Al-Bahrinya
- Ali Bahar † (Al-Ekhwa Band)
- Ahmed Sultan (Sultanies Band) - Bandari + Khaleeji

==== Kuwait ====
- +Aziz
- Bashar al-Shatti
- Nawal El Kuwaitia
- Shams

==== Oman ====
- Salim Rashid Suri

==== Qatar ====
- Fahad Al Kubaisi

==== Saudi Arabia ====
- Abdul Majeed Abdullah

==== United Arab Emirates ====
- Ahlam Al-Shamsi
- Hussain Al Jassmi
- Mehad Hamad
- Shamma Hamdan
- Eida Al Menhali
- Ahllam (Persian + Arabic Khaleeji)
- Hamdan Al-Baloshi
- Shahad Al-Bastaki
- Mehrshad (Bander Abbas-born Emirati Artist)

=== From other Arabic-speaking countries ===
==== Egypt ====
- Amr Diab
- Angham
- Tamer Hosny

==== Lebanon ====
- Diana Haddad
- Nawal El Zoghbi

==== Libya ====
- Ayman Alatar

==== Morocco ====
- Ibtissam Tiskat
- Jannat
- Saad Lamjarred

==== Syria ====
- George Wassouf

==== Tunisia ====
- Saber Rebai
- Thekra

==== Yemen ====
- Abu Bakr Salem Belfkih

== Notable Khaleeji bands ==
Band	Years active	Place of origin	Genre	
Sultanies	1985 ~ 2006	Bahrain	Bandari + Khaleeji	Arabic (Gulf, Egyptian), Persian, Achomi (Bastaki)
Al-Ekhwa	1986 ~ 2011	Bahrain	Khlaeeji, Bahraini	Arabic (Bahraini Gulf Arabic)
Al-Kawakib		Bahrain	Bandari + Khaleeji	Arabic, Persian, Achomi
Sharks		Bahrain	Bandari + Khaleeji	Arabic, Persian, Achomi
Al-Ghuraba'a		Bahrain	Bandari + Khaleeji	Arabic, Persian, Achomi
Al-Danah		Bahrain	Bandari + Khaleeji	Arabic, Persian, Achomi
Al-Salam		Bahrain	Bandari + Khaleeji	Arabic, Persian, Achomi
Al-Anwar Band		Bahrain	Bandari + Khaleeji	Arabic, Persian, Achomi
Miami Band	1986 ~ Present	Kuwait	Bandari + Khaleeji	Arabic, Persian
Ghanati Band		UAE	Bandari + Khaleeji	Arabic, Persian, Achomi
Salami Band		UAE	Bandari + Khaleeji	Arabic, Persian, Achomi
Al-Rahaba Band		UAE	Bandari + Khaleeji	Arabic, Persian, Achomi
Nasa'em Band		UAE	Bandari + Khaleeji	Arabic, Persian, Achomi
Al-Kawakib Band		UAE	Bandari + Khaleeji	Arabic, Persian, Achomi
Mayed Band		UAE	Bandari + Khaleeji	Arabic, Persian, Achomi
Hassan Gharib Band		UAE	Bandari + Khaleeji	Arabic, Persian, Achomi

== See also ==
- Bandari music
- Arabic music
- Arabic pop music
- Islamic music
