= Shams (singer) =

Shams شمس الكويتية
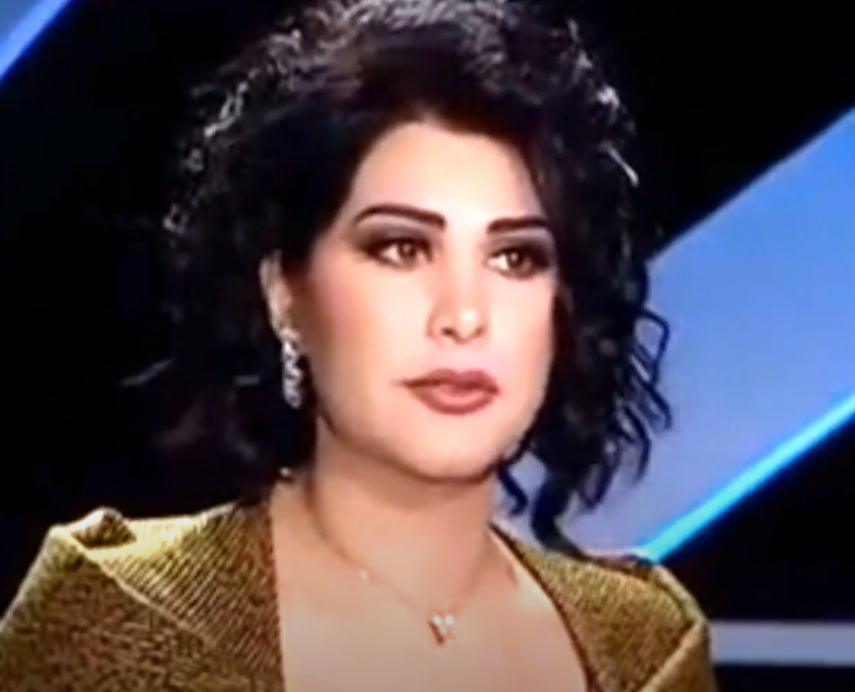

Background information
- Born: Shams Bandar Nayef; 28 April 1980 (age 46); Hafr Al-Batin, Saudi Arabia
- Genres: Khaliji, Arabpop
- Occupations: Singer and actress
- Years active: 2000–present
- Labels: Rotana, Surprise an American company

Shams Bandar Naif Al-Aslami (Arabic: شمس بندر نايف الاسلمي, born 28 April 1980), better known by her former stage name Shams El Kuwaitia (شمس الكويتية) or simply Shams (شمس), is an Arab singer of the Persian Gulf and actor. She dropped her Arab citizenship denouncing her Arab and Gulf culture and origins.

== Personal life ==
She was born in Hafr-Al-Batin Governorate, east of the Kingdom of Saudi Arabia, to a Saudi father and a Kuwaiti mother. Her father died when she was two years old. Her mother then married a Kuwaiti man who raised her. She lived with her mother and husband in Kuwait. She obtained a degree from the Higher Institute of Musical Arts in Kuwait.

She has Saudi, Saint Kitts and Nevis, Mexican, possibly British citizenship, and is an avid supporter of dual nationality laws.

She is often known for her simplicity when it comes to her lifestyle, in which she doesn't brag about wealth or jewellery or private airplanes, when asked about whether she wants to "get on the fashion of private airplanes like other artists" she said:

If your culture, personality, kindness, morals, and upbringing do not add value to you, then airplanes and space rockets will add nothing. The same applies to fashion, jewelry, and other fleeting matters.

— Shams, Al-Rai interview

According to her, a lot of her songs are inspired by occasions and events she went through in her life.

=== Controversies ===
There has always been controversy surrounding her actual origins, while she claims a paternal Arab Bedouin ancestry, former older interviews refer to her as "Shams Al-Bahbahani". This is a common theme in the Arab states of the Persian Gulf region, where many families of Iranian/Persian ancestries (such as the Sunni majority Larestanis) have attempted try to hide or change their roots and/or names, but this also applies to royal families in the Persian Gulf as well.

In 2019 she launched a sharp attack on everyone who criticized her for wearing shorts, and according to the website (A), she confirmed that she was wearing leggings underneath in the clip "Hob Naqis" (Incomplete Love), with lyrics by the Saudi poet Al-Wisam, and music composed by the Iraqi musician Basil Al-Aziz, who also acted as the model alongside her.

She added: "If anyone feels I’ve caused them emotional distress, they should simply not follow me and not upset themselves. There are many people who love to see me, and they resemble me. The art I present is directed to those who... resemble me."

She said: "Modesty is a relative matter. Some believe that even a woman showing her eyes is offensive to their morals. Others see a woman without a niqab as 'immoral,' and some see wearing shorts as something completely normal."

Shams emphasized: "I do not represent any country at all," adding, "I am Shams, coming from outer space, and I do not represent any country. I say this so that no one gets upset with me, especially since I am half Saudi and half Kuwaiti. I don’t want anyone saying, 'You’re from the Gulf, and you’re not allowed to do this or that.' No, sir, this art is mine; I represent myself, not anyone else."

== Career ==
=== Early beginnings ===
Her singing career began with the formation of a popular band at the end of the 1990s, while her actual beginning was when she signed a contract with "Ranad Audio Company", which took over the release of her first album, entitled "Habib Al Ward" in 2001, and was supervised by the Saudi composer Ahmed Cheetah. She continued to present her songs in the Gulf dialect, and released her second album in 2002, and the artist chose the song "Seven Times" to shoot a video clip, and the name of the song is the same as the title of her new album. Shams collaborated again with the Saudi artist Khaled Abdel Rahman after collaborating with him on her first album, where the second song on the album was "Hala" from his words and composition.

=== Rise to fame ===
In 2007 she released two albums in two versions, the first in the Gulf dialect and the second in the Egyptian dialect, "Shams Khaleeji" and "Shams Masri", produced by the American Surprise Company, and she is the first Arab singer to sign a contract with an American production company. A large group of writers in the Gulf countries and Egypt took turns writing the lyrics for the two songs, as well as the melodies and distribution, containing 22 songs, 12 Egyptian songs and ten Gulf songs. This case is the first in the Arab world and the Gulf.In partnership with the Saudi Mohammed Abdo, she released a single titled "The Great Wall of Kuwait" in September 2007, and the music was filmed in the Surra area in Kuwait under the production of Al-Watan TV. Music Studio released her album Sabahak Khair in 2012. The album includes 17 songs in which Shams collaborated with several composers, including Michel Fadel and Nasser Al-Saleh. Shams repeated her collaboration with director Jamil Jamil Al-Maghazi, as he directed her song 24 Hours, which she filmed as a video clip, to promote the album. She entered the world of sports songs dedicated to football fans with her song "Nasrawi Lataklamni" after the popularity of the "Leader Latakalni" tag, which was launched by the fans of the Saudi Al-Nasr Club at the end of 2013, where she released her song on March 23, 2014, and achieved a quarter of a million within a week. Her song Nasrawi Latakalni was broadcast on Saudi TV, becoming the first female singer to have her voice appear on Channel One after more than thirty years of suspension. Shams claimed in an interview on Al Arabiya in 2015, that she had given up her Gulf citizenship and currently holds a British and French green card. Her first acting career was in 2018, when she participated in the comedy series ( Awad Aba A’Jed (series), which is broadcast by MBC channel in Ramadan, starring Asaad Al-Zahrani and Habib Al-Habib.

As of January 2025 her Iraqi Arabic song "Ateg Esba'a" (Arabic: اطگ اصبع, lit. 'I Click a Finger') is the most viewed song on YouTube with over 66 Millions.

== Works ==
=== Albums ===
| Title | Translation | Release year |
|---|---|---|
| حبيب الورد, Habib El-Ward | Lover of Rose | 2001 |
| سبع مرات, Sabe'e Marat | Seven Times | 2002 |
| مظاهرة نسائية, Modhahara Nesae'ea | Women's demonstration | 2005 |
| Shams 2007 | Shams 2007 | 2007 |
| جلسات شمس, Jalsat Shams | Shams Settings | 2010 |
| صباحك خير, Sabahak Khair | Good morning to you | 2012 |
| شگيت ثوبي, Shageet Thoby | I tore my dress | 2017 |

== See also ==
- Nawal
- Ahllam
- Hanan Redha
- Ahlam El-Shamsi
