= Hind (singer) =

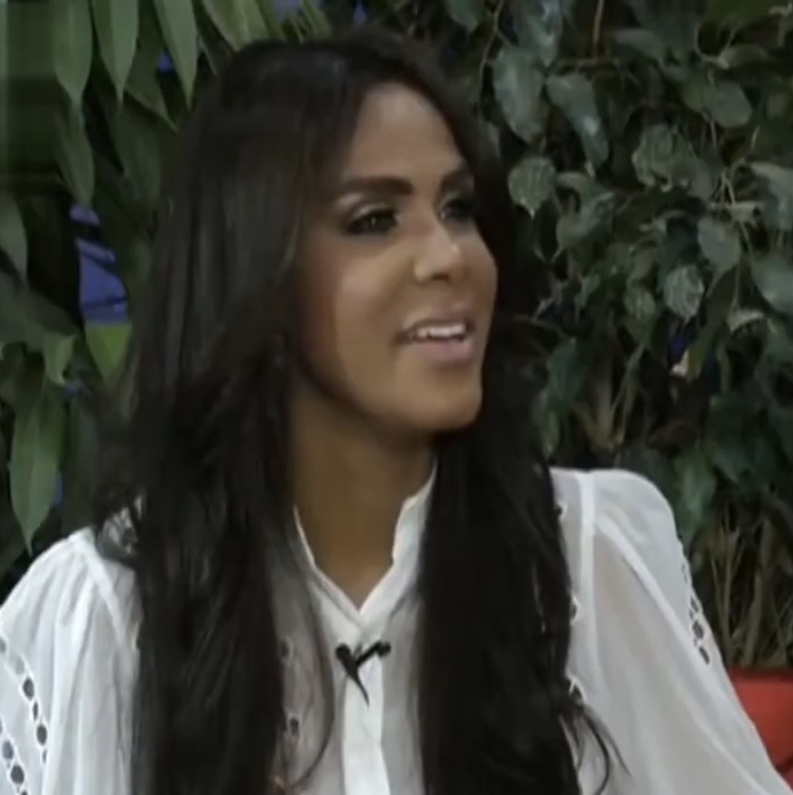

Background information
- Born: Suhair; May 5, 1979 (age 47); Kingdom of Bahrain
- Origin: Bahrain
- Genres: Khaliji Music, Arabic Pop
- Occupation: Singer
- Years active: 2000–present
- Labels: Fanoon Al Emarat, Rotana

Hind (Arabic: هِند, also spelled Hend), is a female Bahraini Afro-Arab singer from Bahrain. Her work includes popular Arabic music as well as traditional Khaliji music. She was discovered by the musician Anwar Abdullah, and gave her the nickname "Hind", but her real name is Suhair. Hind's debut album Rabeie El Galb was released in 2000, after which she became well recognized in Bahrain and the eastern province of Saudi Arabia. It was only after she signed her 2005 album Al Ghroob with Rotana, that she became recognized and famous around the Persian Gulf region.

== Biography ==
Hind was born in the Kingdom of Bahrain. she grew up with her parents and five siblings (three sisters, and two brothers). Her father worked in the Ministry of Social Security, and her mother was a full devoted housewife. She graduated from high school in 1997 (the same year she joined in creating as a co-founder of a Bahraini traditional music group). She enrolled into Bahrain University majoring in Business Management. In the year of 1999, Hind left the university to pursue a music career after she was recognized by the well-known Kuwaiti musician Anwar Abdullah. She was signed to the company "Fanoon El Emarat" which produced her first album Rabeie El Galb also known as Hind 2000.

In 2002, she got married. Ten months later on, she gave birth to her first child "Abdullah". In 2003, she released her second album Hind 2003, also known as Qassi, which did not leave a big remark in the music business as the first one did. Also in the same year, her fan website was launched and she was given the nickname "Farashat Al-Khalij (The Gulf's Butterfly)" and "Beyoncé Al-Arab (The Arab Beyoncé)". Sadly, her marriage did not last long where it ended in 2004.

2005 was the turning point in Hind's life, where she signed with the music company Rotana her third album titled Hind 2005, also known as Al Ghroob. Off that album, Hind has made a tremendous entry in the music industry where that was her key to success throughout 2005 to 2007.

Hind released an album in 2008. The album included twelve songs which were sung in different dialects such as Khaleeji, Lebanese and finally Egyptian. In 2012, she released her latest album Hind 2012. It was also revealed she had married George Nimr, a Lebanese executive producer at the Kuwaiti television station Al-Watan, in December of that year.

In March 2020, she revealed she had tested positive for COVID-19, becoming the first Arab celebrity to test positive for the disease. She has since made a full recovery.

== Discography ==
=== Studio albums ===
- Hind 2000 Rabeie El Galb (2000)
- Hind 2003 (2003)
- Hind 2005 Al Ghroob (2005)
- Hind 2008 (2008)
- Hind 2012 (2012)

== See also ==
- Hala Al Turk
- Hanan Redha
- Ali Bahar
