= Sultaneez =

Music group

Sultaniz/Sultanies
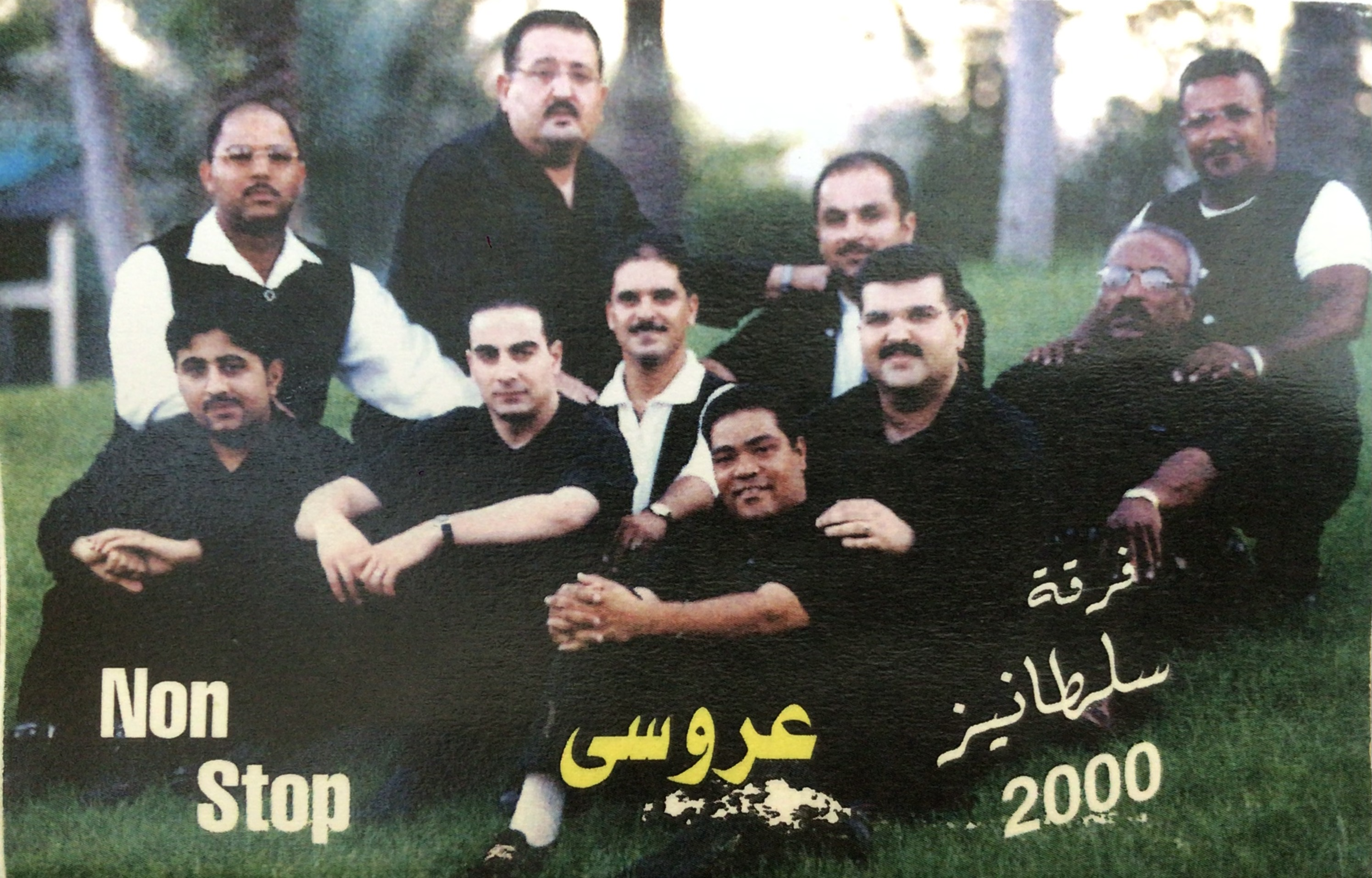
- Sultanies band on their final Persian album cover "Aroosi Non-stop" circa 2000

Background information
- Origin: Bahrain
- Genres: Bandari music (Bastaki Achomi, Persian), Arabic Khaleeji music, Egyptian Arabic, English pop
- Years active: 1985–2006
- Past members: Ahmed Sultan; Habib Sultan; Khaled Abdul Aziz; Hisham Hakimi; Youssef Sultan; Abdul Qadir; Nabil Gurban; Gholum Murad; Mahmoud Bahram; Adel Abbas; Ahmad Jahromi; Abbas Fawad Ramin; Khaled Ismail; Juma'an Mohammad; Khaled; Sultan

Sultaniz or Sultanies Band (Arabic: فرقة سلطانيز) were a musical band of Bahraini Iranians who published and performed folkloric songs of Irahistan (Laristan) in Achomi/Khodmooni/Lari Parsig (Bastaki dialect), and songs in Tehrani/Iranian Farsi and Arabic (Egyptian and Gulf Dialects). This group is known in Bahrain as "Sultaniz/Sultanies group" (Arabic: فرقة سلطانيز). The first album of this group was released in 1989 and the last album was released in 2003. The main singer of the group was "Ahmad Sultan".

== History ==
The Band was formed in August 1985 in Tariq Sultan's engagement party in the Hilton hotel, Bahrain, they continued to gain in popularity by the people of Bahrain and south Iran up until their dissolution in January 2006.

During their years of activity, Sultaneez performed on Bahrain television and music festivals, and have influenced the musicians of the new southern singers of Iran. It is because of this that Sultanies are remembered as one of the most influential bands of southern Iranian (Bandari) music.

After their "Qesat hoby" album in 1996 Ahmed Sultan, Ali Bahar and Jamal Al-Seeb and released a collaborative Album titled "Carnival Bahraini" (Arabic: كرنڤال بحريني), Then in 2003 Ahmed Sultan and the Sultanies Band released an album titled "Ismahili," with rotana

Ahmed Sultan currently works at the Bahrain Economic Development Board (Bahrain EDB), he is an Executive Director – International Offices & Business Development (Manufacturing, Transport & Logistics).

=== Legacy ===
Their Bastaki Achomi/Khodmooni Parsig song "Naz Akon Naz Akon" inspired by Yusuf Hadi Bastaki's folkloric song of the same name, and one of the most popular songs of this group, released on 25 June 1990, (Note: Released on: 1990-06-25) was the basis that inspired Kouros Shahmiri's Iranian Persian song "Naz Nakon", which was released later (1998 AD), (Note: States the release date is 1998-06-29, remastered on: 2001-06-22) which was also inspired by Sultanies' "Raftom Bebagh" (رفتوم به باغ) which in addition to Kouros Shahmiri's version, also inspired the 2017 Iraqi Arabic version "Hallah Hallah Ya Jamallak" (Arabic: هالله هالله يا جمالك) by Oras Sattar, (Note: Which achieved 299 Million views! More than the original song that inspired it!) the 2010 song "Chayi Chayi" by Kouros was also inspired by the song of Soltaniz "Chayi Chayeem Kalam Dard Akon", which was released in 1989, additionally, in March 2024 a Mazendarani inspired rendition of "Raftom Be Bagh" was sung and published by Ebi Aali titled "Shah Detar" (King's Daughter/Princess).

On 19 August 2024, Ahmed Sultan remastered his songs "Naz Akon + Raftom Bebagh," bringing a fresh and updated sound to the beloved track.

== Group members ==
The manager of the group was Abdullah Ishaq and the main singer was Ahmad Sultan. Other members of the group were as follows:

- Ahmad Sultan: keyboard, lead singer
- Habib Sultan: Bass Guitar
- Khaled Abdul Aziz: Drums – singer
- Hisham Hakimi: Timba – singer
- Youssef Sultan: Choral
- Abdul Qadir: Percussion
- Nabil khonji: Drums
- Gholum Murad: Timba ✞
- Mahmoud Bahram: Percussion
- Adel Abbas: Drums
- Ahmad Jahormi: Drummer
- Abbas Fawad Ramin: Choral
- Khaled Ismail, Juman Mohammad and Khaled: Sound Engineering
- Sultan: Percussion

== Works ==
=== Albums ===
Album	Songs	Release year	Language
موسم بهار, mawsem-e-bahar, 'Spring Season'	1. ای یار ای یار (Ey Yaar Ey Yaar); 2. موسم بهار (Mowsam-e Bahaar); 3. چایی چایی (Chaai Chaai); 4. إینه کن/چشم ماست (Eyneh Kon / Chashm-e Maast)	1989	Achomi (Bastaki)
هجران, hijran, 'separation'	1. سالوا (Saalu); 2. يالوميما (Ya Lomeema); 3. ام الجدائل (Umm al-Jadaail); 4. نار الشوق (Naar al-Shawq); 5. هجران (Hijraan); 6. حلفتك بالله (Halaftak Billah)	1989	Arabic (Bahraini, Gulf dialects)
خود بدا, Khod Beda	1. اِشو گُلُم شبرِن (Ishoo Golom Shabren); 2. ناز اَکن ناز اَکن (Naaz Akan Naaz Akan); 3. دِلبَر (Delbar); 4. اخ ای دِلُم (Akhi Ey Dilom); 5. منوعات بستكية 1 (Manoo'aat Bastakiyya 1); 1. اسمُش نادانم (Ismush Naadanam); 2. وای دل من دل من (Vaay Dil-e Man Dil-e Man); 3. ثریا جان ثریا (Soraya Jaan Soraya); 6. خود بدا (Khud Badaa); 7. رَفتَم به باغ (Raftam Be Baagh); 8. منوعات بستكية 2 (Manoo'aat Bastakiyya 2); 1. چِینک بَکُنِم (Chink Bakonam); 2. دل ناگره (Dil Naagre); 3. وای وای اومناشا (Vaay Vaay Omnasha)	1990	Persian (Farsi), Achomi (Bastaki)
حبيبه, Habibeh, 'Lover (female)'	1. حبيبه (Habiba); 2. أشعار الغزل (Ashaar al-Ghazal); 3. ودي أقول (Waddi Aqool); 4. بين النجوم (Bain al-Nujoom); 5. أنا ودي أشوفك (Ana Waddi Ashoofak); 6. أطفلة الأمس هذه اليوم (Atiflat al-Ams Haadhihi al-Yawm)	1991	Arabic (Bahraini, Gulf dialects, MSA)
یارُم گُلِن, Yarum Golen, 'My friend is a flower'	1. ای وای دلُم (Ey Vaay Dilom); 2. یارُم گلن (Yaarum Golan); 3. از کنگلی (Az Kongli); 4. میگی تاویت (Migi Taavit); 5. ناستاران (Naastaan)	1994	Achomi (Bastaki)
قصة حبي, Qisat Hobi, 'Story of my love'	عيوني (Oyooni); قصة حبي (Qissat Hubbi); ديرتي البحرين (Deerti al-Bahrain); جيت أعرف (Jeet A'arif); فدوه (Fadwa); يلي ضوت ناره (Yalli Dawwat Naareh)	1996	Arabic (Bahraini, Gulf dialects)
Bahraini Carnival (كرنڤال بحريني) – Collab	Dando Sernai (داندوصراني) ft. Jamal El-Seeb; Domo'a Al-aeen (دموع العين) ft. Ali Bahar; Zeyada (زيادة) ft. Ahmed Sultan; Gubgub Helani (قبقب حيلاني) ft. Jamal Al-Seeb; Yefez El-Khofoug (يفزالخفوق) ft. Ahmed Sultan; Magyolah (مقيوله) ft. Ali Bahar	1996	Arabic (Bahraini, Bahrani, Gulf dialects)
Aroosi without stop (عروسی بدون توقف)	خشگل (Khoshgel); لباتو غانچه (Labato Ghaancha)	2000	Persian (Farsi)
اسمحيلي, Esmaheely, 'Allow me (female)'	وينه (Wainah); مواويل (Mawaweel); مرت علي (Marrat Alay); كرمال عيونك (Kermal Oyoonak); عميق الشوق (Ameeq al-Shawq); شسولف لك (Shasoolif Lak); تعالي (Ta'ali); اشتقت لك (Eshtaqt Lak); اسمحيلي (Ismaheeli)	2003	Arabic (Bahraini, Bahrani, Lebanese, Gulf dialects)

=== Singles ===
- Ahmed Sultan – Zendegi Ba To (Cover)
- Ahmed Sultan – Naz Akon (ناز اکن), 2024.
- Ahmed Sultan – Bastaki Party (حفله بستکی), 2025.

== Gallery ==
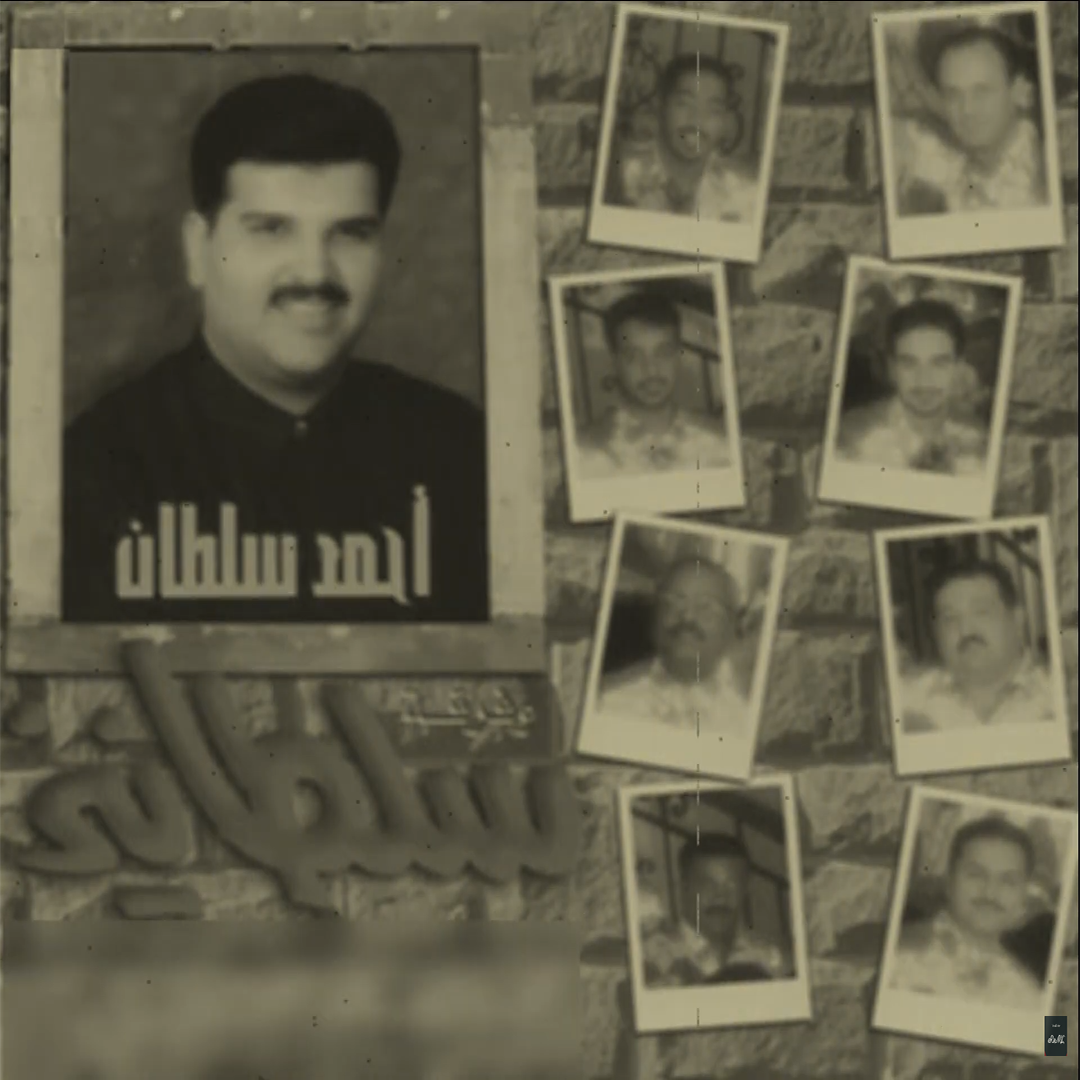

Sultanies "mawsem-e-bahar" group shot

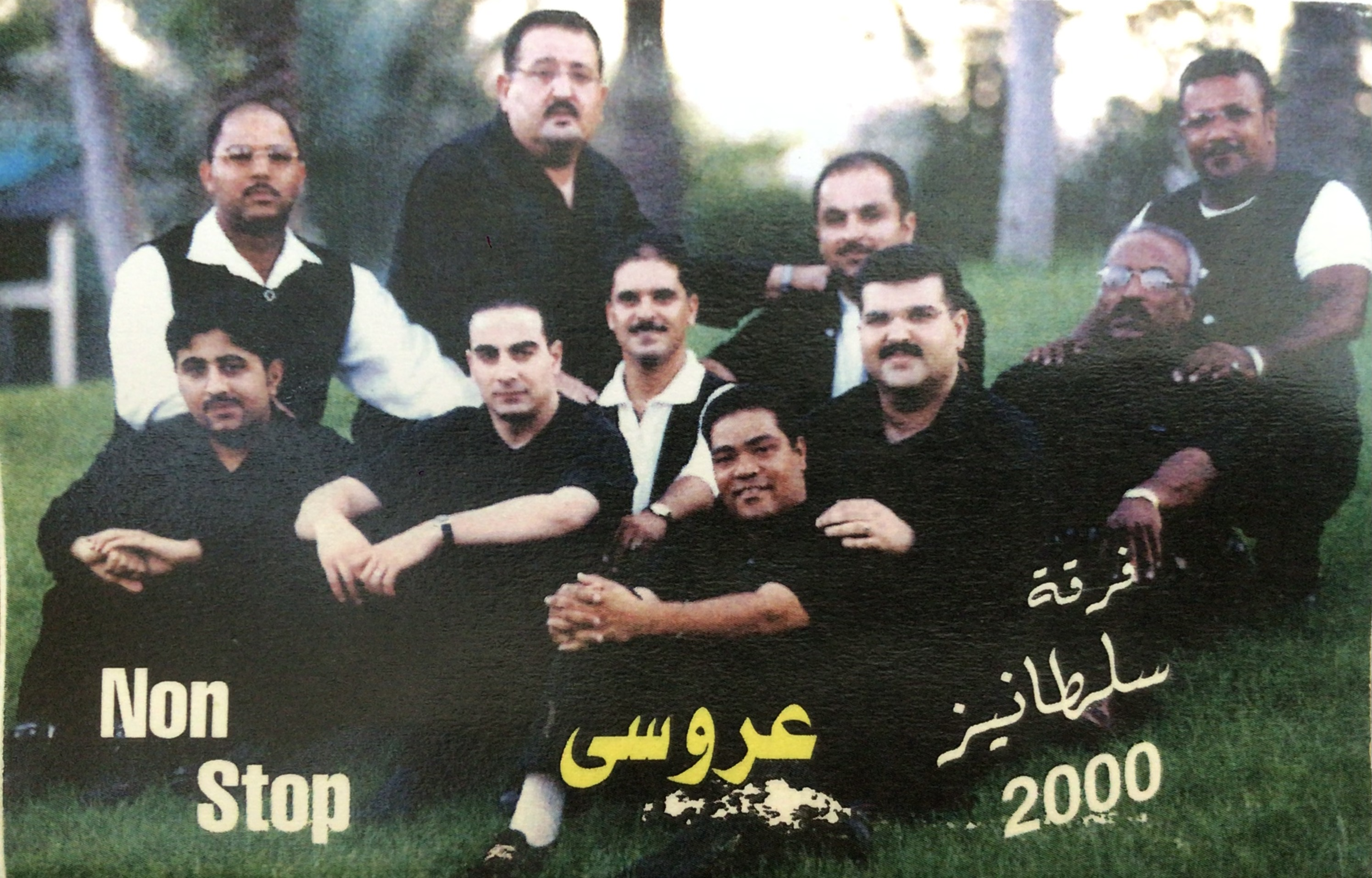
Sultanies "Aroosi without stop" album cover

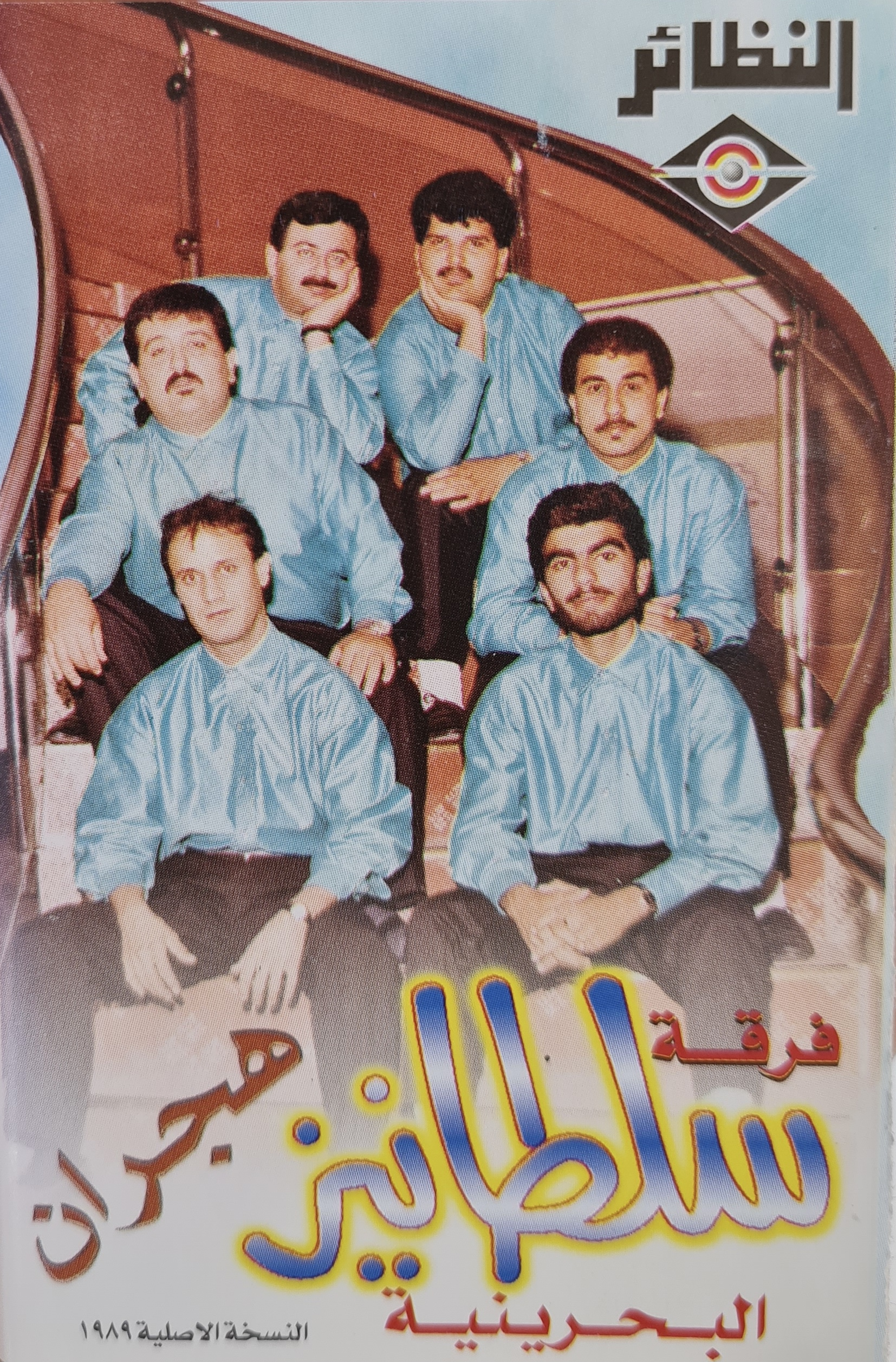
Sultanies Hijran Album cover

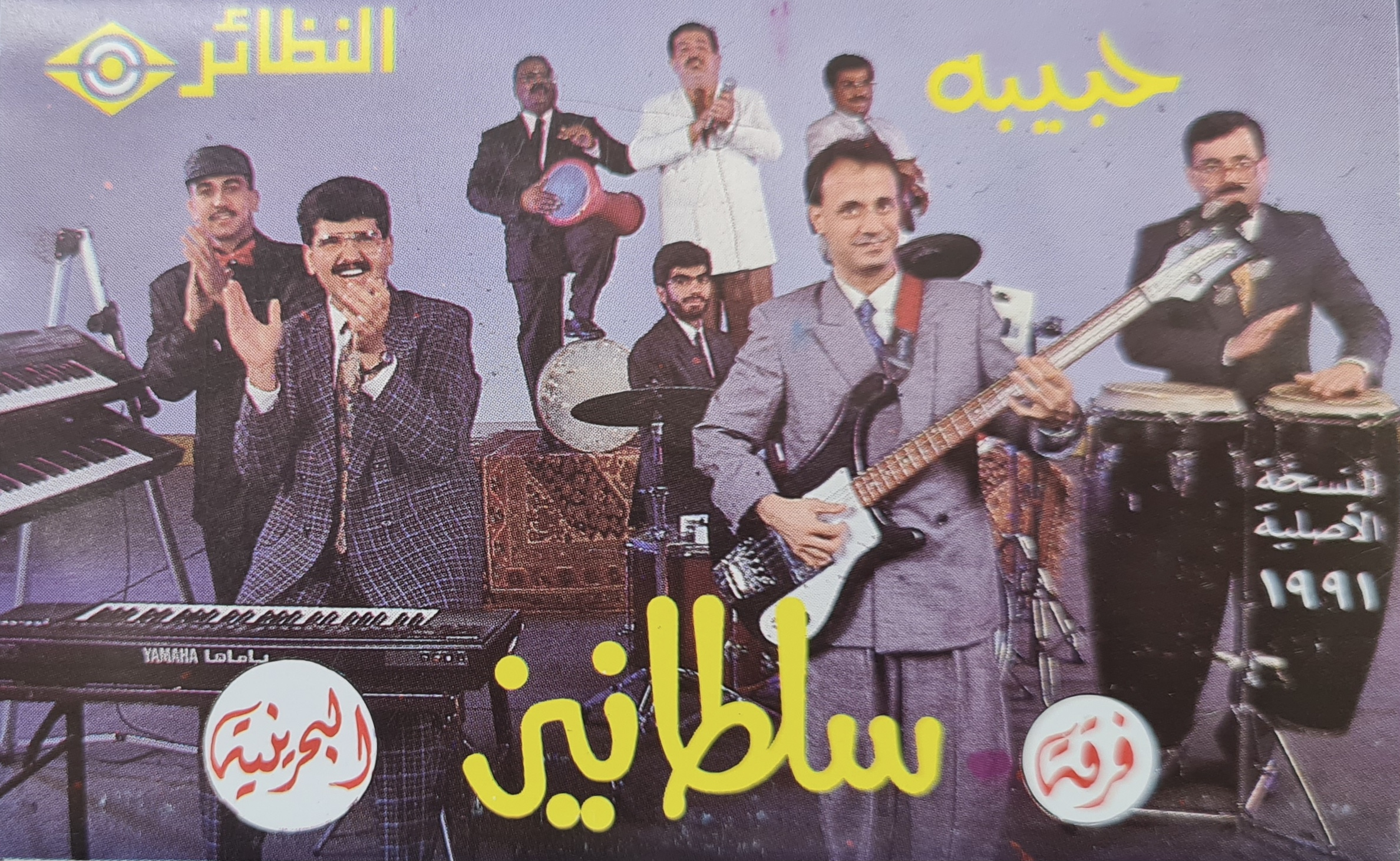
Habibeh Album cover
