= Thekra =

Tunisian singer (1966–2003)

Thekra ذكرى
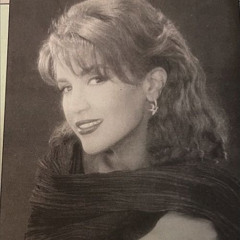
- Thekra in 2003

Background information
- Born: Thekra bint Mohammed Al Dali; September 16, 1966; La Marsa, Tunisia
- Died: November 28, 2003 (aged 37) Cairo, Egypt
- Genres: Khaleeji music; taarab; Arabic music; Arabesque music; Middle Eastern music
- Occupation: Singer
- Years active: 1980s–2003
- Labels: Rotana; EMI; Mega Star; Golden Cassette

Thekra bint Mohammed Al Dali (Arabic: ذكرى بنت محمد الدالي; September 16, 1966 – November 28, 2003), better known as Thekra (ذكرى), (Note: Also romanized as Thikra, Zekra or Zikra, meaning "memory" or "memorial".) was a Tunisian singer.

== Career ==
Thekra started performing at school. In 1980, she performed on the TV show Fan Wa Mawahib (فن ومواهب), after which she joined the show's choir. In 1983, her first recording was made, of a song composed by Abdul Hameed Khareef. In the same year, she performed at the Carthage Festival.

Later she joined the vocal group section of the Tunisian Radio and TV Establishment's national band. There, she met Abdul Rahman Al Ayyadi, who composed many of her later songs. Thekra became known for her powerful voice and her ability to perform many kinds of Arabic music genres, including qasa'ed, muwashshah and tarab songs.

=== Tunisia ===
During the 10 years before moving to Egypt, she released 30 songs in Tunisia. 28 of them were composed by Abdulrahman Al Ayyadi. Some of her successful singles in Tunisia included:

- "Liman Ya Hawa Satakoon Hayati Wa Kaifa Sa'Arifo Ma Howa Aati?" (لمن يا هوى ستكون حياتي وكيف سأعرف ما هو آتي؟; "To whom does my life belong and how should I know how it will end up?")
- "Habeebi Tammin Fo'adi" (حبيبي طمن فؤادي; "My beloved, comfort my heart")
- "Ela Hadhn Ommi Yahin Fo'adi" (إلى حضن أمي يحن فؤادي; "My heart misses my mother's hug")
- "Wadda'at Roohi Ma'ah Min Youm Ma Wadda'ani" (ودعت روحي معاه من يوم ما ودعني; "I said goodbye to my soul which is gone with him since the day he said goodbye to me").

In 1990, she had an argument with Abdulrahman Al Ayyadi, who was her fiancé at the time, because he did not want any other person to compose for her. She left and joined a new group, Zakharif Arabiya (زخارف عربية).

=== Libya ===
She stayed for a while in Libya and released many songs written and composed by Libyan poets and composers including Mohammed Hassan, Ali Al Kailani, Abdullah Al Mansoor and Salman Al-Tarhooni. Her last album released in Libya was "Nafsi Azeeza", written by the poet Al-Tarhooni, which won best performance and lyrics at the Sharm el-Sheikh Festival in Egypt.

=== Egypt ===
After her career in Libya, she returned to Tunisia for a time, but then moved to Egypt. In Egypt, she met the musician Hani Mihanna who produced two of her albums. Wehyati Andak in 1995 was successful in the Arab world: until then she was known in the West side of the Arab world, but after that album she became widely known all over the Arab world. Mihnna also produced her second album, As'har Ma'ah Sertak, in 1997.

A few months later in 1997 she released Al Asami with a different producer and in 2000 Yana. Her last album in Egypt was Youm Aleek, released in 2003, only three days before her murder.

Her most successful singles performed in Egyptian Arabic were:

- "Wehyati Andak" (و حياتي عندك; "And my life is yours")
- "Mish Kol Hob" (مش كل حب; "Not all love")
- "Youm Aleek" (يوم عليك; "One day to you")
- "Bahlam Beloa'ak" (بحلم بلقاك; "I dream of meeting you")
- "Al Asami" (الاسامي; "The names")
- "Yana" (يانا)
- "Ya Azeez Aini" (يا عزيز عيني; "Oh my dear darling")
- "Law Ya Habeebi" (لو يا حبيبي; "If only, my beloved")
- "Ya Khofi" (يا خوفي; "Oh my fear")
- "Kol Elli Lamooni" (كل اللي لاموني; "Everything they blamed on me").

=== GCC and Persian Gulf region ===
Thekra performed many songs and album in different Arab dialects including Gulf Arabic, also known as "Khaleeji".

She released many Khaleeji albums with Saudi record company Funoon Al Jazeera and they are:

- Thekra (1998)
- Thekra 2 (2002)
- Thekra 3 (2003)
- Wish Maseeri (2003) – recorded entirely in the Emirati dialect
- Wa Tabqa Thekra (2004) – posthumous release
- Aghani A'ajabatni (2004) – posthumous release, duet album with Thamer Al Turki.

She also performed duets with several Khaleeji singers, including with Abu Bakr Salim in the song "Mishghil Al Tafkeer", and a duet with Mohammed Abdu in 2003. She was going to perform a duet with Abdullah Al Rowaished but was killed before it could be recorded.

Her most successful singles in Gulf Arabic were:

- "Elain El Youm" (الين اليوم; "To this day")
- "Wainik Enta" (وينك انت; "Where are you")
- "Ma Feeni Shai" (ما فيني شي; "Nothing's wrong with me")
- "Ahibbik Moot" (احبك موت; "I love you to death")
- "Ghayib" (غايب; "Gone")
- "Al Jarh" (الجرح; "Hurt")
- "Qalaha" (قالها; "He said it")
- "Hatha Ana" (هذا انا; "This is me")
- "Al Mesafir" (المسافر; "The traveller").

== Controversy and political interpretation ==
“من يجرأ يقول” (“Who dares say”) is a 1990s Arabic political-style song performed by Thekra. The song has been widely interpreted as a symbolic critique of the politicisation of religious pilgrimage and restrictions on access to holy sites, particularly through its references to the Kaaba and Hajj.

Some commentators have argued that the lyrics use religious imagery in a metaphorical way to express opposition to political control over pilgrimage and freedom of movement. In particular, lines referencing pilgrimage to Mecca alongside ironic alternatives such as visiting the Vatican have been interpreted as satirical commentary on geopolitical tensions of the time.

According to some sources, the song was written in the context of political tensions relating to Hajj access and broader Arab regional disputes during the early 1990s. These interpretations link the lyrics to criticism of the politicisation of religious practice, although such claims are not uniformly documented across academic sources and remain subject to differing viewpoints. The song has also been discussed in online media as a politically sensitive work due to its use of religious symbolism and its perceived critique of authority. However, there is no confirmed record of an official ban in major academic or encyclopedic sources, and interpretations of the song’s meaning vary among listeners and commentators.

The song remains part of broader discussions regarding the use of symbolic and political language in Arabic music during the late 20th century.

== Death ==
On 28 November 2003, Thekra was murdered in a violent attack at her home in Cairo, Egypt, carried out by her husband, the businessman Ayman Al-Suwaidi. In what was later confirmed to be a murder-suicide, Al-Suwaidi used a firearm to kill Thekra and her personal secretary and business manager before turning the weapon on himself. Autopsy reports revealed that Thekra had been shot 26 times and had survived for around 15 minutes after the attack. Her secretary was shot 22 times and her manager 18 times. Forensic findings confirmed that Al-Suwaidi had used one weapon to kill the three victims and a different one to take his own life.

Her body was transported from Egypt to Tunisia on board the private plane of Al Waleed bin Talal, accompanied by many Arab celebrities who flew with her to attend her funeral. Singers who have performed Thekra's songs at their concerts include Assala, Sherine, Ghada Rajab, Elissa and Samira Said.

Latifa did not perform any of Thekra's songs. Instead, she recorded a Tunisian folk song called "Fi Al Ghorba" and dedicated it to her. Latifa also dedicated her 2003 Murex d'Or award for Best Female Singer to Thekra and requested that a tribute be played in her honour.

== Singles ==
- "Al Hilm Al Arabi" (الحلم العربي) – with others
- "Ommahu" (أماه) – trio with Ali Al Hajjar & Moniem
- "Nihlam Eih?" (نحلم إيه؟) – duet feat. Angham
- "Hilmina Al Wardi" (حلمنا الوردي) – duet feat. Mohammed Abdo
- "Ya Hajiri" (يا هاجري)
- "Al Asmaraniya" (الاسمرانيه)
- "Baghdad La Tata'allami" (بغداد لا تتألمي) – with others

== Videography ==
- "Ya Khofi" (يا خوفي)
- "Wehyati Andak" (و حياتي عندك)
- "Al Asami" (الاسامي)
- "Al Hilm Al Arabi" (الحلم العربي) – with other Arab singers
- "Kol Elli Lamooni" (كل اللي لاموني)
- "Allah Ghalib" (الله غالب)
- "Qalaha" (قالها)
- "Elain El Youm" (الين اليوم)
- "Al Jarh" (الجرح)
- "Atfaal" (أطفال)
- "Wala Arif" (ولا عارف) – feat. Ehab Tawfiq
- "Nihlam Eih?" (نحلم إيه؟) – feat. Angham
- "Youm Aleek" (يوم عليك)
- "Bahlam Belo'ak" (بحلم بلقاك); she shot parts of it before her death but the video was never completed so the idea was changed, it was montaged to make her appear as a ghost.
- "Law Ya Habeebi" (لو يا حبيبي); she shot parts of the clip mentioned above "Bahlam Belo'ak" before her death but the video was never completed so the idea was changed, it was montaged to make her appear as a ghost.
