= Bijarwadh =

Bijarwadh is a famous area among the main areas of the Kohlu district, near Tadri. The Chief of Bijarwadh was Wadra Jangho Khan and Nari Ali Gul Kalwani, after their death their tribe migrated to Sindh province in 1980, later son of Wadra Jangho Khan, Wadra Ghulam Hussain Maree was selected as the new chief of their tribe and they are permanently settled at District Matiari Sindh .
