= Youm Aleek =

Studio album by Thekra
- Released: November 2003 (worldwide); November 2003 (Arab World)
- Genre: Arab pop music, Classic, Arab Tarab, Arabic music, Arabesque music, Music of Egypt, Middle Eastern music
- Length: 36:26
- Label: Rotana

Youm Aleek (Arabic: يوم عليك) is the last studio album by the late Tunisian Diva Thekra and was produced by Rotana in 2003.

This album was the most successful Egyptian dialect album of Thekra ever. Rotana stated that the album was re-printed and re-released four times because it was out of stock due to its massive success.

== Track listing ==
1. Youm Aleek (4:40) يو عليك (A day against you or a rainy day)
2. Bahlam Be Lu'aak (3:10) لحلم بلقاك (I am dreaming of meeting you)
3. Ya Layali (5:07) يا ليالي (Oh nights)
4. Shawwa'ouni Leek (4:53) شوقوني ليك
5. Illi Khadouni (3:56) إللي خذوني
6. Law Ya Habibi (6:05) لو يا حبيبي (If my beloved one)
7. Azeez Ghali (5:03) عزيز غالي
8. Ana Shayfah (4:52) انا شايفه

== Singles ==
- Youm Aleek.
- Bahlam Be Lu'aak (Music video released after her death)
- Law Ya Habibi (Music video released after her death)
