= Nawal (singer) =

Nawal نوال الكويتية
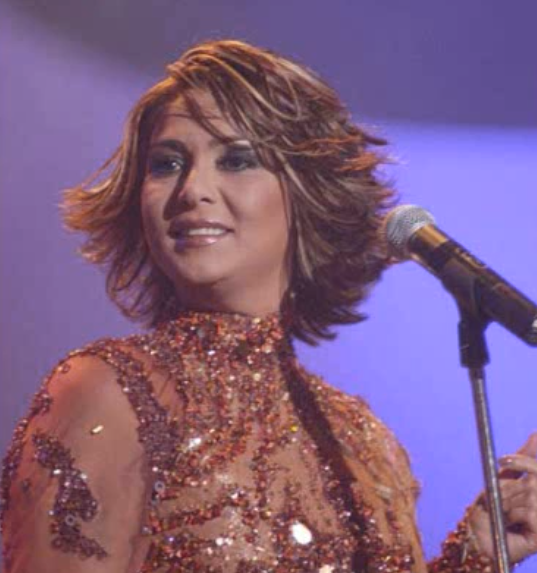

Background information
- Born: Nawal Thaher Al-Zaid نوال ظاهر حبيب الزيد; 18 November 1966 (age 59)
- Origin: Iraqi
- Genre: Classic music
- Occupations: Singer-songwriter, actress
- Years active: 1983–present
- Labels: Bou Zaid Phone (1984–1989); Funoon al Jazeera (1994); Al-Nazaer (1995); Rotana (1995–2019) (2023–present); ONE Production (2019)
- Spouse: Meshaal Al Arouj (m. 2009)

Nawal Thaher Habib Al-Zaid (Arabic: نوال ظاهر حبيب الزيد, 18 November 1966), better known by her former stage name Nawal El Kuwaitia (نوال الكويتية) or simply Nawal (نوال), is a singer and actress.

== Career ==
Nawal studied at the Music Institute in Kuwait.

Nawal's first album was released in 1984. The majority of her albums are not titled, but rather are referred to by number (e.g. Nawal 98, Nawal 99). She has also filmed many music videos (mainly in Lebanon) and was one of the first Khaliji artists to do so.

After retiring from her singing career for personal reasons, Nawal returned after five years with a duet performed with Abdullah Rashad, "Kan Widdi Niltiki" ("I Wished We Could Have Met").

In 2022, she joined Spotify's EQUAL Arabia as its ambassador for the month of July.

In December 2024, it was reported that her citizenship was revoked by the Kuwaiti government, amid hundreds of nationality revocations in the country. As such, Nawal reportedly removed her titular nickname "El-Kuwaitia" from all of her social media pages.

== Discography ==
=== Albums ===
- Nawal (1984)
- Nawal (1985)
- Nawal 1986
- Nawal 1988
- Nawal 1989
- Nawal 1994
- Wainek 7abeeby (1995)
- Tadri (1996)
- Nawal 1998
- Nawal 2000
- Nawal 2002
- Nawal 2004
- Nawal 2006
- Nawal (2009)
- Nawal (2013)
- Nawal (2016)
- El Haneen (2020)
- Al Ard (2023)
- Ana W Ozoof (2024)

=== Singles ===
- "Kan Widdi Niltiki" 1994 (duet with Abdullah Rashad)
- "Allah Haseebak" 2000
- "Taab Qalbi" 2000
- "Ahawel" 2001 (duet with Fadl Shaker)
- "El Shoq Jabek" 2002
- "Biyehsidouni Aleeh" 2004
- "Othorini" 2005 (duet with Abdallah Al Rowaished)
- "Habeebat Galbi" 2007(duet with Abdallah Al Rowaished)
- "Yemer Esmik Ala Lsani" 2009 (duet with Abdallah Al Rowaished)

=== Music videos ===
- "Ana Min Shouktak" ("I Am the One Who Excited You")
- "Dourobi" ("My Paths")
- "Sineen wa Ayam" ("Years and Days")
- "Arafat Kadri" ("I Knew My Fate")
- "Marra Aateek" ("Once I Give You")
- "Lawla Al Mahabba" ("Had it Not Been for Affection")
- "Tadri" ("You Know")
- "Ana Walla Ant" ("Is It Me or You)
- "La Rihit Anni" ("If You Go Away")
- "Ya Msabbir Il Mwuoud" ("You Who Hold Promises")
- "Lesh" ("Why")

== Revocation of Kuwaiti citizenship ==
On 30th of November 2024 a Kuwaiti Emiri decree had been issued to withdraw the citizenship of Nawal.
