= Bandari music =

Music genre

Bandari music (Persian: بندری) stems from Iran's south, around the Persian Gulf region such as Lorestan, Khuzestan, Larestan/Irahistan (Bandar Abbas, Bastak, Banaruiyeh...), and other locations.

Bandari songs are often sung in Southern Iranian Languages, like Luri, Achomi (Lari), and various coastal Bandari (Garmsiri) dialects.

== Music ==
It is a rhythmic type of dance music played in fast and slow tempos. The music includes instruments and vocals, and it is played during celebrations such as weddings.

The word “bandari” means “of the port” and is a derivation of the Persian word bandar, meaning port. It is commonly known as "Chamak" or "Chamaki" music in the GCC region.

== Instruments ==
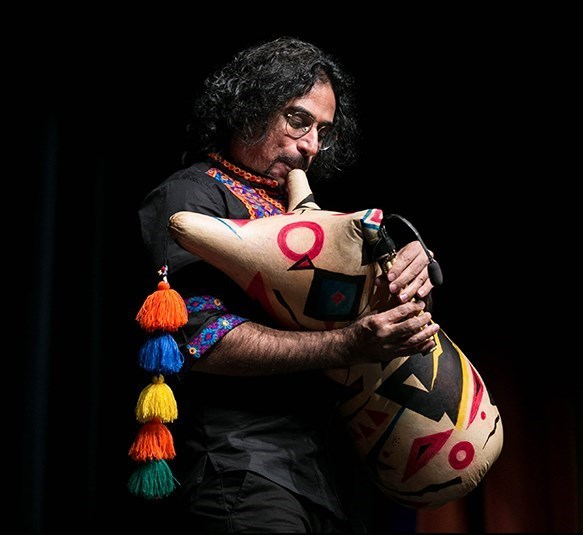
Mohsen Sharifian with a Ney-Anban (Bandari/Khaleeji Bag-pipe)

The major musical instruments used in the Bandari style include the Ney Anban (a bagpipe instrument made of goat's skin), the tombak (a percussion instrument made of animal skin and the wood of the walnut tree), the daf (a percussion instrument made of animal skin and a wooden frame like the head of a drum, with jingles on the rim, similar to the tambourine), and the darbuka (a percussion instrument made of fish skin and clay).

Modern Persian Bandari bands use rhythmic instruments such as the frame drum, darbuka, djembe, talking drum, quinto, conga, and acoustic and electric drums specialized in 6/8 rhythms.

== Known Bands and Artists ==
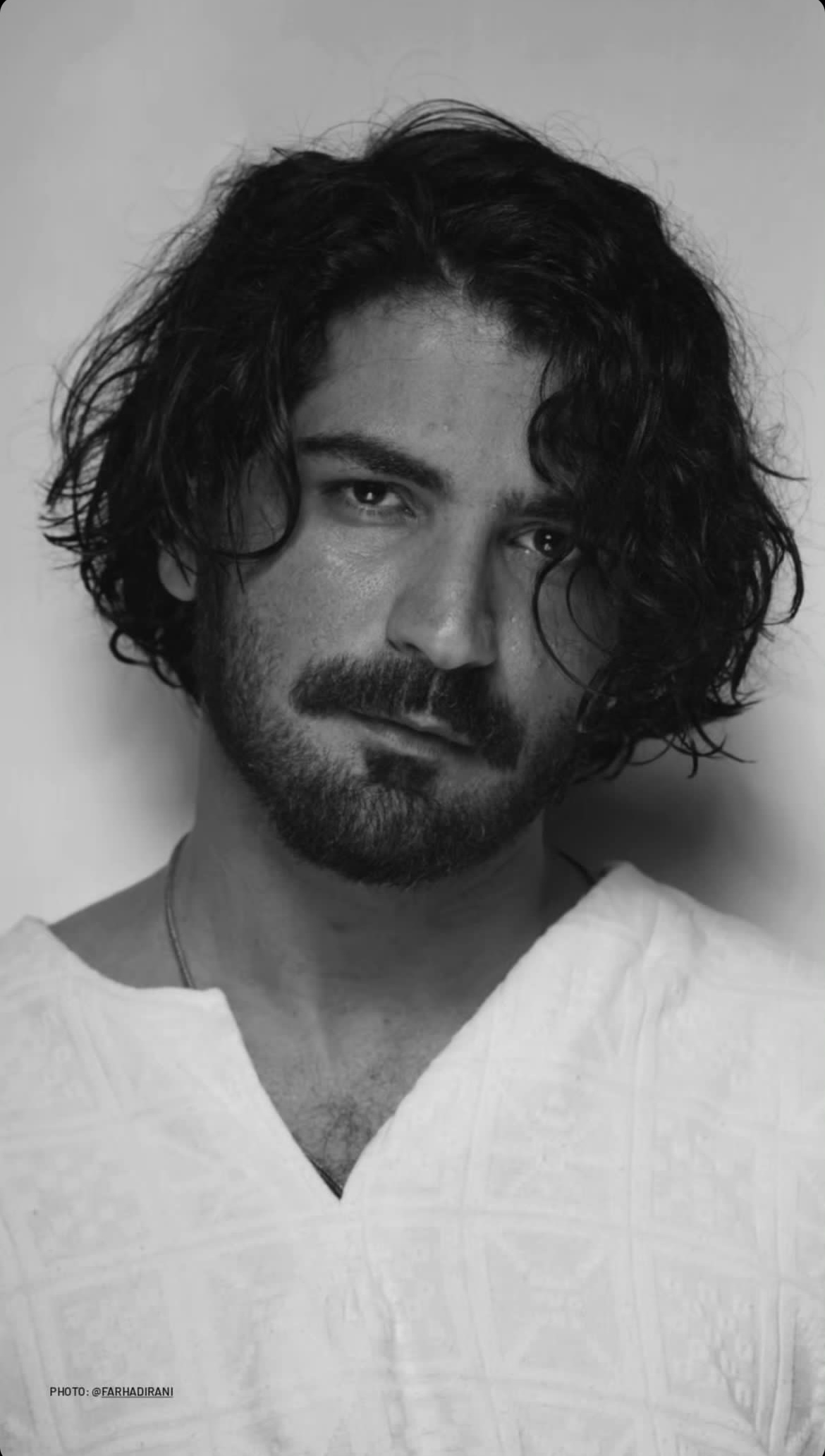
Tahmasbi is among the most influential and well-known singers from southern Iran in the modern era.

- Nematollah Aghasi (نعمت‌الله آغاسی) – Aghasi is arguably one of the big names that helped popularize Bandari-style party music nationally; often cited as an early mainstreamizer of the style.
- Mahmoud Jahan (محمود جهان) – one of the most important actual southern/Bandari voices; often called a major face of Bandari from inside Iran, especially tied to the Bandar-Neshinan style.
- Mohsen Sharifian (محسن شریفیان) – Bushehri folk revival / نی‌انبان (ney-anban) giant, hugely important for southern sound.
- Lian Band (گروه لیان) – one of the most important modern groups for Bushehri southern folk revival.
- Yousif Hadi Bastaki – An Achomi Persian Bastaki singer born in Bahrain, buried in Bastak, known for inspiring later bands such as Sultanies.
- Mohammad Rohandeh – Bandari singer
- Nasser Abdollahi
- Sultanies – Bahraini Bandari band, led by Bahraini-Achomi Persian Ahmed Sultan.
- Sandy – Band, various songs.
- Boyz – Band, known for a few of their Bandari songs.
- Moein – Sang Bandari songs like Bigharar, among others.
- Leila Forouhar (لیلی فروهر) – Known for her viral Jonobi/Bandari Song "Jooni Joonom", scoring over 70 million views on YouTube.
- Miami – A Kuwait based band with Afro-Arab, and Persian members and songs.
- Shahrum Kashani (شهرام کاشانی) Known for his viral Jonobi/Bandari Song "Dokhtar Bandari", scoring over 30 million views on YouTube.
- Hassan Shamaeezadeh
- Mehrshad Bahrami – UAE Based-Bander Abbasi singer.
- Ahmed Shafeie
- Arvin Bastaki
- Erfan Tehmasbi – Iranian-Bakhtiari Lur, Jonobi/Bandari and Pop Persian Singer.
- Lorazis Band
- Saeid Hosseini – Iranian-Luri singer.
- Ali Bastaki
- Mohsen Isfindiyari
- Ghanati (Emirati Band)
- Salami (Emirati Band)
- Al-Kawakeb (Bahraini Band)
- Jassim Khodarahmi
- Saleh Janahi
- Al-Anwar (Band)
- Siddiqa Fahimi (صدیقه فهیمی)
- Arshavin
- Al-Ghoraba'a Band (فرقة الغرباء) – Bahraini-Persian Bandari band.
- Hassan Aseeri
- Al-Habayeb Band (فرقة الحبايب) – Emirati-Persian band.
- Naser Abdollahi - He was a Bandar-Abbasi singer with songs in the bandari style like "Bandar Abbasi"
