= Hala Al Turk =

Khaliji actress and singer (born 2002)

- حلا الترك
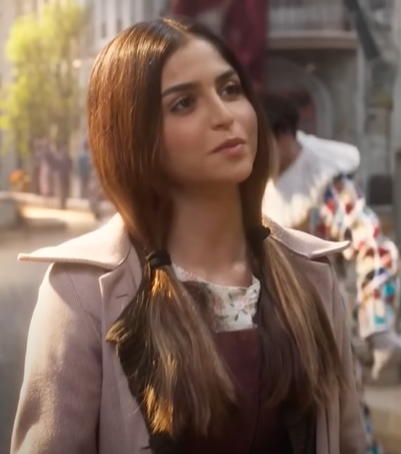
- Born: Hala Muafaq Mohammed Al Turk Al Blooshi حلا موفق محمد الترك البلوشي; May 15, 2002 (age 24); Manama, Bahrain
- Occupations: Singer; host; actress; dancer; khaliji
- Years active: 2011–present
- Musical career
- Instrument: Vocals
- Labels: Platinum Records; AlTurk Productions

Hala Al Turk (Arabic: حلا الترك; born May 15, 2002) is a Bahraini actress and singer. She became known for being a contestant on Arabs Got Talent in 2011. Al Turk then released many singles, including "Bnayty El Habooba (2011)" featuring singer Mashael, for which she become a popular child singer. In early 2015, she moved to her father's company, Al Turk Productions.

In January 2022, a video was released with her new song "Ana Magnoona", which brought her a resounding success.

== Biography ==
She was born on May 15, 2002, to a Bahraini father and a Syrian mother in Manama, Bahrain. Al-Turk holds Bahraini citizenship. She has two brothers named Mohammed Al Turk and Hamood Al Turk. She started her career through the program, Little Star (Arabic: ستار صغار), in 2009, but came to prominence in 2011 through her participation as a contestant on Arabs Got Talent. She was eliminated but went on to establish a successful career as a child singer. She is currently signed to Al Turk Productions.

In 2013 was released "Happy Happy" is the first Arabic music video to cross 100 million views. She subsequently signed to Platinum Records and released other singles.

In 2014, she hosted the entertainment program, Huwa Wa-hay Wahi (Arabic: هو وهاي وهي), during the month of Ramadan alongside Haya Al Shuaibi, Amal Al Awadhi and Bashar Al Shatti.

In January 2022, a video was released with her new song "Ana Magnoona", which brought her a resounding success; in the video she appeared in three images (black, white and pink) and performed dance moves.

== Discography ==
Year	Song	Arabic name	Length
2011	Bnayty El Habooba feat. Mashael	بنيتي الحبوبة	4:02
2012	Baba Nezel Ma'asha	بابا نزل معاشه	4:11
2012	Zahgana	زهقانة	4:41
2012	Jaa Al Qamar ft. Aseel Omran	جاء القمر	3:05
2012	Ya Rab Samehny Ya Rab	يارب سامحني	3:57
2013	Mamlakat Al Bahrain	مملكة البحرين	2:58
2013	Happy Happy	هابي هابي	4:26
2013	Namy ft. Aseel Omran	نامي	2:48
2014	Tren Tren	ترن ترن	2:32
2015	Live In The Moment		3:35
2015	Ah Ya Qamar ft. Dounia Batma	آه يا قمر	4:40
2016	Why I'm So Afraid		5:11
2017	Happy Birthday Hammad	عيد ميلاد سعيد حماد	4:31
2017	A3shak Deraty	أعشق ديرتي	3:18
2017	3endak 7elm	عندك حلم	5:35
2018	Mamnoo Ellames		3:55
2018	Ok Habibi ft. Julian		2:35
2018	Nahwaky Ya ElBahrain	نهواك يا البحرين	4:56
2019	Khali Blash	خالي بلاش	2:50
2020	Shtebi Menni	شتبي مني	3:37
2021	Ya Leyali Sef ft. Jad Shwery	يا ليالي الصيف	3:42
2022	Ana Majnouna	أنا مجنونة	2:44
2022	Allo Ya Habibti	الوو يا حبيبتي	3:50
2023	Labbeih	كليب أغنية لبيه	3:06
2024	Ahla	أحلا	4:09
2025	Ahebbah	احبّه	3:37
