= Funoon al Jazeera =

Arab music production company

Funoon al Jazeera (in Arabic فنون الجزيرة) is an Arab music production company that has signed a number of Arab artists.

It was established in 1980 by artist Talal Maddah and ownership was later transferred to artist Rashed Al-Majed.

The company keeps the ownership of the archive of its founder Talal Maddah.

== Artists ==
- Talal Maddah - deceased
- Rashed Al-Majed - owner, CEO
- Mohammed Abdu
- Abass Ibrahim
- Abdallah Al Rowaished
