= Ahllam =

Iranian-Emarati singer, musician and dancer

- Born: 1991 (age 34–35); Ahvaz, Khuzestan, Iran
- Occupations: Actor; singer; Footballer
- Years active: 2010–present
Association football career
- Height: 1.74 m (5 ft 9 in)
- Position: Defender
Senior career*
Years	Team	Apps	(Gls)
2004–2009	Sepahan Woman	10	(5)
- * Club domestic league appearances and goals

Ahllam (Persian: احلام, Arabic: أحلام, born 1991 in Ahvaz, Khuzestan, Iran) is an Iranian-Emirati singer of Khaliji music and dancer. She is known for her contributions to Persian pop music and Arabic music.

== Early life and education ==
Ahllam was born in Ahvaz, Iran. Her father was from Ahvaz, while her mother was from Tehran. Her grandfather is of Dubai origins. developed an interest in music at a precocious age. Her family encouraged her to pursue music and solfège classes with Iranian pop and folk music celebrity Ebi.

Ahllam was a member of the Sepahan Isfahan women's soccer team in Iran and has played in the Kowsar Iranian Premier League.

=== Controversies ===
In 2023, Ahllam released a controversial music video version of her new song "Acetaminophen" which was taken down some time after, possibly due to negative reception, it has been relisted since, and not all reception was negative as indicated by the comments on the video which been reuploaded on another channel prior to relisting.

== Career ==
She started her activities first in Iran and underground and then moved to Dubai and now lives there. After that she released the songs "Behtarin" (Best), "Sheytoon" (Devil), "Del Divooneh". And "Pashimoonam" (I regret) published by Avang Music. Her artwork is broadcast on Gala Networks and PMC TV.

In Sep 8, 2018 she released her music video for "Chi Az in Behtar" and is considered her most viewed video to date, as of January 2025, the video has received over 3 Million views.

== Discography ==
=== Singles ===
Song title	Translated Title	Release year	Language & Dialect
Ey Kash	I Wish	2014 (Video)	Farsi (Iranian, Tehrani)
Dargeer	Engaged/Involved	2014 (Video)	Farsi (Iranian, Tehrani)
Ba Ham	Together	2015 (Video)	Farsi (Iranian, Tehrani)
Bargard	Turn/Come Back	2016 (Video)	Farsi (Iranian, Tehrani)
Nafas	Breath	2016 (Video)	Farsi (Iranian, Tehrani)
Digeh Dereh	It's too late	2017 (Video)	Farsi (Iranian, Tehrani)
Behtarin	The Best	2017 (Video)	Farsi (Iranian, Tehrani) + Gulf Arabic
Sheytoon	Devil	2018 (Video)	Farsi (Iranian, Tehrani) + Moroccan Arabic
Pashimoonam	I'm Sorry/Regrateful	2018 (Video)	Farsi (Iranian, Tehrani)
Del Divone	Crazy Heart	2018 (Video)	Farsi (Iranian, Tehrani)
Chi Az in Behtar	What's Better Than This	2018 (Video)	Farsi (Iranian, Tehrani)
In Del Shode Havaei	This heart became Airy	2019 (Video)	Farsi (Iranian, Tehrani) + Minimal Gulf Arabic sentences
Hava Aaliyeeh	Great weather	2019 (Video)	Farsi (Iranian, Tehrani)
Bacheh	Child	2019 (Audio)	Farsi (Iranian, Tehrani)
Jadoo	Magic	2020 (Audio)	Farsi (Iranian, Tehrani)
Lalaeiye Baba	Daddy's Lullaby	2020 (Video)	Farsi (Iranian, Tehrani)
Enta Habibi	You Are My Love	2020 (Audio)	Gulf Arabic (Mespotamian/Khouzestani)
Ya Hichki Ya To	Either No One or You	2020 (Video)	Farsi (Iranian, Tehrani) + Gulf Arabic (Mespotamian/Khouzestani)
Ba Tou	With you		
Eshghe Shirinam	My Sweet Love	2021 (Video)	Farsi (Iranian, Tehrani)
Oon Male Mane	That One is Mine	2021 (Audio)	Farsi (Iranian, Tehrani)
Marde Maneh	My Man	2022 (Audio)	Farsi (Iranian, Tehrani)
Jan Jananam	Life of my life	2022 (Video)	Farsi (Iranian, Tehrani)
Acetaminophen	Acetaminophen/Paracetamol	2023	Farsi (Iranian, Tehrani)
Ambulance	Ambulance	2024 (Video)	Farsi (Iranian, Tehrani)
Aashegh Khasteh	Lover of Tiredness	2024 (Video)	Farsi (Iranian, Tehrani)
Ta'aal	Come	2025 (Video)	Farsi (Iranian, Tehrani) + Arabic (some parts; including title)
