= Larestan region =

Larestan / Laristan لارستان
- Larestan, Laristan
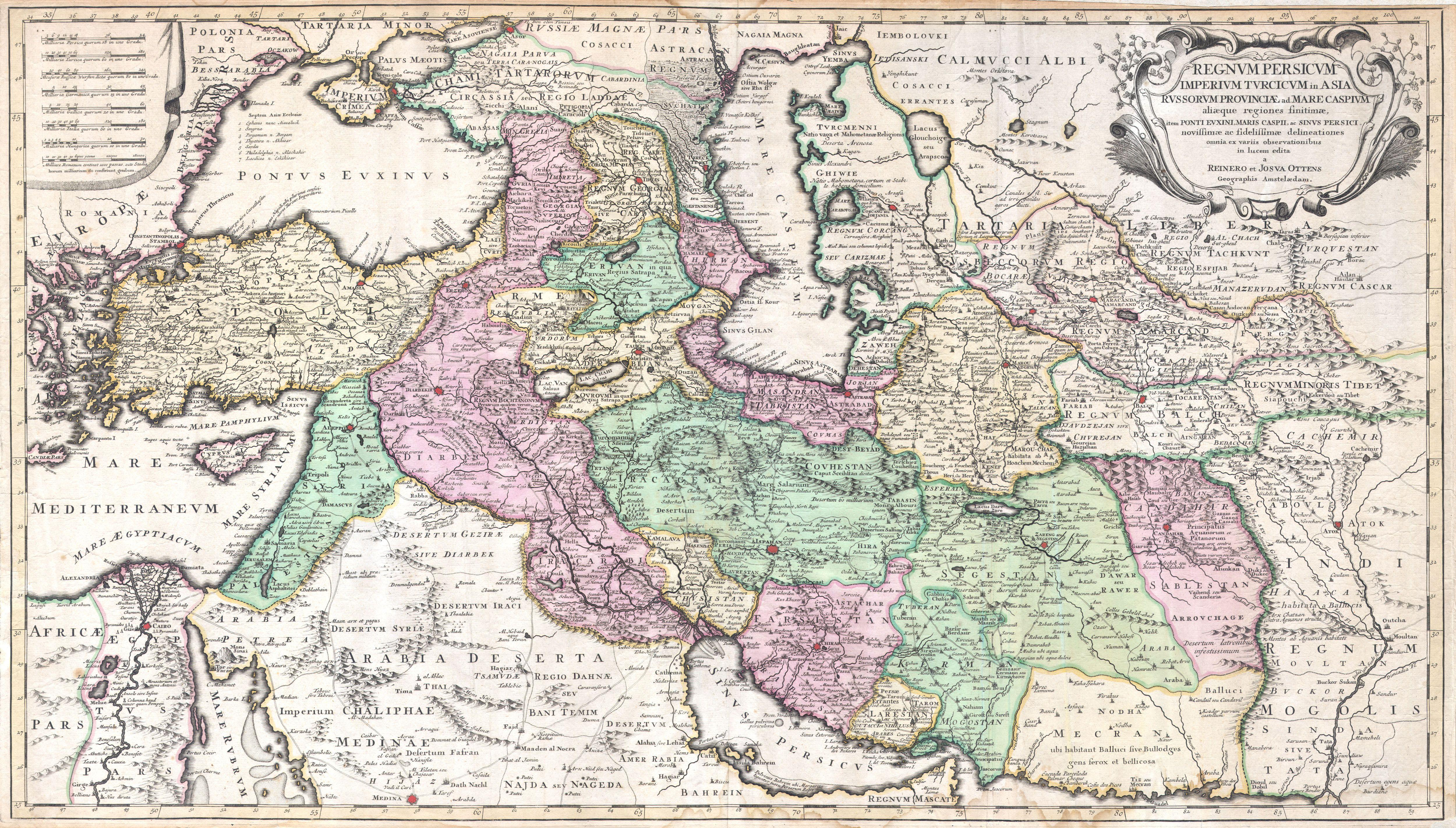
- A European map from 1730, where it shows Larestan located in the shores of the Persian Gulf, between Kerman and Fars.

Area
  - Total: 45,000 km^{2} (17,000 sq mi)

Population
  - Total: 1,000,000 (In Larestan only)

Larestan or Laristan (Persian: لارستان) is a region in the south of Iran, located in the west of Hormozgan, south of Fars, and south of Bushehr province. It is predominantly inhabited by the Laris, Baluchis, Kurds, Arabs, and the Qashqai. Larians or Laris are about 1,000,000 living in Larestan with an estimated 2,000,000 Larestanis living in Arab states of the Persian Gulf, due to extensive immigration occurring in the 19th and 20th century for better job opportunities and a better life. Irahestan (Persian: ایراهستان) is a historical region that corresponds to Larestan.

== Demographics ==
According to Anthropological study of Iran from 1939, the population of Laristan as a whole has been estimated at about 90,000 inhabitants. Meanwhile, those living on the coast line were said to be to a great extent Arabs, while the farmers are principally Persians [Iranis].

In the 1970s, the population of Larestan was recorded at 183,369, with the current estimate being around half a million. The region is predominantly inhabited by Laris, along with Baluchis, Kurds, Arabs, and the Turkic-speaking Qashqais from the Khamseh tribal confederation. Historically, Laristan has also seen settlements by Mongol, Turkmen, and Uzbek ethnic groups. Additionally, Jewish communities of craftsmen and traders were present, especially in Lar city. Lar played a significant role in the Judeo-Persian literary tradition, with texts in Judeo-Persian produced there, marking it as one of the medieval centers for this writing tradition (Loeb 1970: 31 ff.).

== Larian or Larestani language ==
The main language spoken in Larestan is known either as Larestani, Lari, Achomi, or Khodmuni.

It is a southwestern Iranic language and a descendant of Middle Persian.

It has few Arabic loanwords and is much purer than Persian. It has at least five dialects which are Lari, Bastaki, Khonji, Evazi, and Gerashi.
