= Abdallah Al Rowaished =

Arab singer from Kuwait (born 1961)

Abdullah Alruwaished عبد الله الرويشد
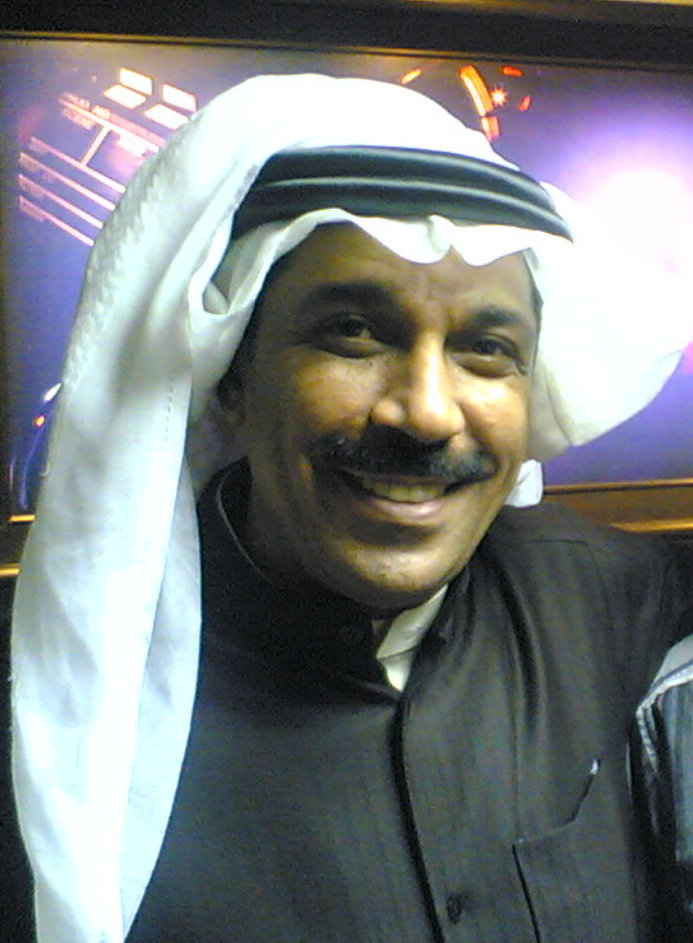
- Alruwaished in March 2007

Background information
- Born: Abdallah Abdulrahman Mohamed Alruwaished عبد الله عبد الرحمن محمد الرويشد; July 18, 1961 (age 65); Hawalli Governorate, Kuwait
- Origin: Kuwait
- Genre: Arabic music
- Years active: 1975–present
- Label: Rotana

Abdallah Alruwaished (Arabic: عبدالله الرويشد, born July 18, 1961) is an Arab singer and actor from Kuwait. He has released over thirty albums.

== Biography ==
Alruwaished began his solo career in the early 1980s with the release of his first album with AlNazaer Music Production Company. Alruwaished released albums throughout the 1980s.

During the early 1990s, Alruwaishid relocated temporarily to Egypt as Kuwait was invaded by Iraq. From there he continued his music career. After the end of the Gulf War, Alruwaished returned to Kuwait and continued his music career.

In 2008, he recorded the theme song for the Arab Press Production Center television drama series Oyoun Alya.

== Discography ==
- Rahalti (1983)
- Ay Ma'aza (1984)
- Eb Ay Haal (1985)
- Astahmelek (1986)
- Mashoor (1987)
- Abdallah Alruwaished 1988 (1988)
- Abdallah Alruwaished 1989 (1989)
- Abdallah Alruwaished 1990 (1990)
- Abdallah Alruwaished 1992 (1992)
- Abdallah Alruwaished (1993)
- Alruwaished 1994 (1994)
- Ramady (1995)
- Lemni Ebshoug (1996)
- Tasawer (1997)
- Wainek (1998)
- Sadigeeni (1999)
- Watan Omri (2000)
- Wein Rayeh (2001)
- Efeeni (2002)
- Ah Ya Zeman (2003)
- El Shoug W El Dama'a (2004)
- Mafee Ahad Mertah (2005)
- Abdallah Alruwaished 2006 (2006)
- Abdallah Alruwaished 2008 (2008)
- Temana (2009)
- Laylat Omer (2010)
- Enty Helm (2011)
- Malik Bel Hob (2015)
- Tesalem Alek (2017)
