= Bahraini Gulf Arabic =

Gulf Arabic dialect spoken in Bahrain

- Bahraini Sunni Arabic
- Native to: Bahrain
- Native speakers: 70,000 (2019)
- Language family: Afro-Asiatic: Semitic; Central Semitic; Arabic; Peninsular; Gulf; Bahraini Gulf Arabic

Official status
- Official language in: Not official in any country
- Regulated by: Not recognised as a language

Language codes
- ISO 639-1: none
- ISO 639-3: –
- Glottolog: bahr1247

Bahraini Gulf Arabic (Arabic: لهجة بحرينية, romanized: Lahjat Baḥraynīyah) is a Gulf Arabic dialect spoken in Bahrain. It is spoken by Bahraini Sunnis (Arabs and Ajams) and is a dialect which is most similar to the Gulf dialects spoken in Qatar and eastern Saudi Arabia.

An sociolinguistic feature of Bahrain is the existence of three distinct dialects: Bahrani Arabic (a dialect primarily spoken by Baharna in Shia villages and some parts of Manama), Sunni and Ajami Arabic.

In Bahrain, the Sunni Muslims form a minority of the population, but the ruling family is Sunni. Therefore, the Arabic dialect represented on television is almost invariably that of the Sunni population, and power, prestige and financial control are associated with the Sunni Arabs. This is having a major effect on the direction of language change in Bahrain.

As with all Bahraini dialects, it is heavily influenced by Indo-European languages, including Iranian languages such as Achomi; an example of this is the use of the word dulāgh (دولاغ) instead of jorab (جوراب) for socks, which is used more commonly in modern Persian and Arabic; the former has been influenced by the latter, in addition to Persian, and Indo-Aryan languages, such as Hindi and Urdu; an example of this is that Bahrainis do not use the formal Arabic heza'a (حذاء) to describe a 'shoe' but they rather say jooti (Urdu: جوتا, singular) or jawati (plural). English (itself an Indo-European language), has also had an influence on Bahraini Arabic, for example Bahrainis say ambaloos (عمبلوص) for 'ambulance', and esweech (سویچ) for 'electronic keys', It is also influenced by Turkish.
