= Ali Bahar =

Bahraini musical artist (1960–2011)

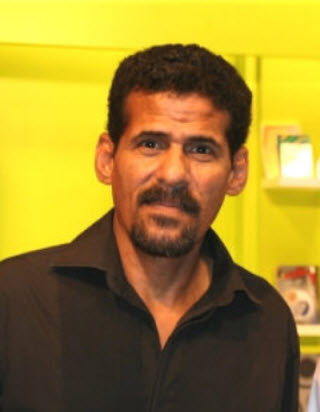

Background information
- Born: Ali Khamis Ebrahim Bahar; 1960; Fareej Al Bin Ali, Muharraq, Bahrain
- Died: July 3, 2011 (aged 50–51) Manama, Bahrain
- Instruments: Vocals; guitar; organ
- Formerly of: Al Ekhwa

Ali Khamis Ebrahim Bahar (Arabic: علي خميس إبراهيم بحر; 1960 – 3 July 2011) was a Bahraini singer, guitarist and organ player known for his music band Al Ekhwa (Arabic: الإخوة, literal translation: The Brothers). He was nicknamed the "Bob Marley of the Gulf" and has been called as being "the best musician in Bahrain's and Arab's history". He sang and performed in national concerts and multiple international music festival and was renowned around the gulf especially in Bahrain and Oman.

He had been applauded for many of his songs such as Terhal, El-Bareha, Yuma Warda and Balad Aini.

== Biography ==
Bahar rose to celebrity status in Muharraq, Bahrain's third largest city, where his father was a fisherman. He also lived in Sharjah, where he had several friends and continues to have many supporters.

His music band, Al Ekhwa which he formed in 1986 helped boost his popularity. He was the lead singer, guitarist and organist in the band.

His popularity was mostly based around the gulf countries, of which the majority were in Oman and Bahrain.

== Discography ==
Ahibik Mout

Akher Resala

Balad Aini.

Dumue Aleayn

El-Bareha

Hatha Jiza Teeby

Jat Beedha

La Risayel

Maghrour Ala Shinho

Maqyulah

Mu Minni

Rahli min Hayati

Shasawy Lik

Talat Alghaybat

Terhal

Tesadig Aad

Yihoun Alaij

== Death ==
Ali was admitted to the Salmaniya Medical Complex in Manama, on 30 June 2011, after suffering from shortness of breath. On 3 July, he died of kidney failure, caused by pneumonia at 11 am.

== See also ==
- Music of Bahrain

== Sources ==
- Ali Bahar's top songs. Apple Music.
- Ali Bahar's top songs. Shazam.
