= Demographics of Bahrain =

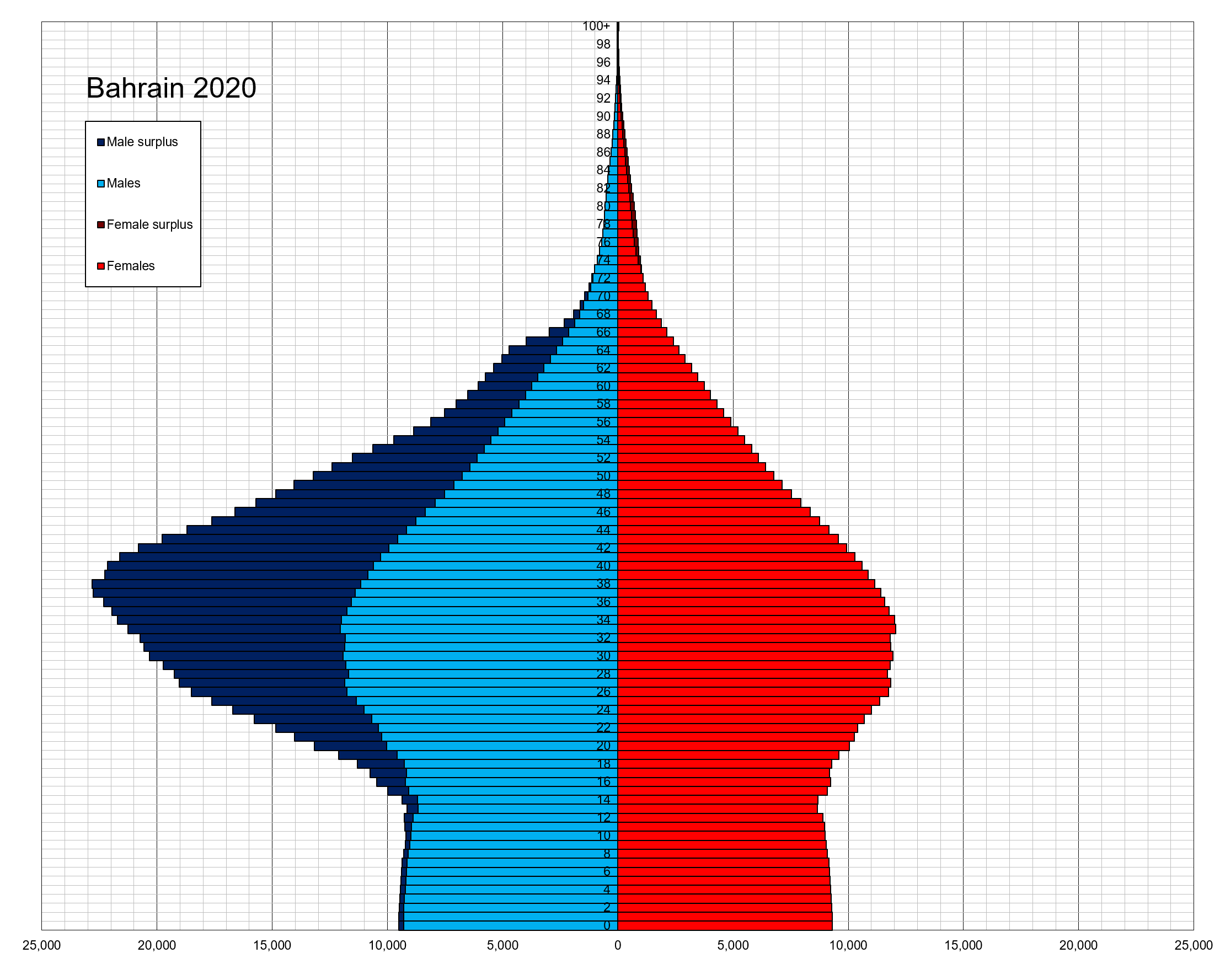
- Population: 1,675,572 (2026)
- Growth rate: 0.88% (2022 est.)
- Birth rate: 12.4 births/1,000 population
- Death rate: 2.82 deaths/1,000 population
- Life expectancy: 79.9 years
  - male: 77.63 years
  - female: 82.24 years
- Fertility rate: 1.67
- Infant mortality: 10.19 deaths/1,000 live births
- Net migration rate: -0.82 migrant(s)/1,000 population
- Immigrant share: 52.3% (2024)

Age structure
- 0–14 years: 20.13%
- 15–64 years: 76.71%
- 65 and over: 3.16%

Nationality
- Nationality: Bahraini
- Major ethnic: Bahraini - 46%

Language
- Official: Arabic
- Spoken: Arabic (Bahraini, Bahrani), Persian, English, Urdu

Demographics of Bahrain, Data of FAO, year 2005; Number of permanent inhabitants in thousands.

The demographics of the population of Bahrain includes population density, ethnicity, education level, health of the populace, economic status, religious affiliations and other aspects of the population.

Most of the population of Bahrain is concentrated in the two principal cities, Manama and Al Muharraq.

== Population ==
Historical population
Year	Pop.	±% p.a.
1950	116,000	—
1960	162,000	+3.40%
1970	212,000	+2.73%
1980	358,000	+5.38%
1990	493,000	+3.25%
2000	638,000	+2.61%
2010	1,262,000	+7.06%
2020	1,501,635	+1.75%
2024	1,588,670	+1.42%

=== Population census ===
Population of Bahrain according to nationality 1941-2024
census year	Bahraini		non-Bahraini		total population
census year	#	%	#	%	total population
1941	74,040	82.3%	15,930	17.7%	89,970
1950	91,179	83.2%	18,471	16.8%	109,650
1959	118,734	83.0%	24,401	17.0%	143,135
1965	143,814	78.9%	38,389	21.1%	182,203
1971	178,193	82.5%	37,885	17.5%	216,078
1981	238,420	68.0%	112,378	32.0%	350,798
1991	323,305	63.6%	184,732	36.4%	508,037
2001	405,667	62.4%	244,937	37.6%	650,604
2010	568,399	46.0%	666,172	54.0%	1,234,571
2020	712,362	47.4%	789,273	52.6%	1,501,635
2024	739,736	46.6%	848,934	53.4%	1,588,670

=== Structure of the population ===
Population by Sex and Age Group (Census 17.III.2020):

Age group	Male	Female	Total	
Age group	Male	Female	#	%
Total	942,895	558,740	1,501,635	100%
0-4	52,591	51,012	103,603	6.90%
5-9	53,578	51,416	104,994	6.99%
10-14	47,812	45,864	93,676	6.24%
15-19	41,062	38,276	79,338	5.28%
20-24	60,706	40,725	101,431	6.75%
25-29	101,401	54,679	156,080	10.39%
30-34	154,215	57,757	211,972	14.12%
35-39	134,083	51,794	185,877	12.38%
40-44	95,104	44,385	139,489	9.29%
45-49	70,467	33,509	103,976	6.92%
50-54	49,621	27,786	77,407	5.15%
55-59	34,498	23,095	57,593	3.84%
60-64	22,418	16,353	38,771	2.58%
65-69	12,499	9,200	16,877	1.44%
70-74	6,184	5,177	11,361	0.76%
75-79	3,216	3,363	6,579	0.44%
80-84	2,002	2,452	4,454	0.30%
85+	1,438	1,897	3,335	0.22%
Age group	Male	Female	Total	
0-14	153,981	148,292	302,273	20.13%
15-64	763,575	388,359	1,151,934	76.71%
65+	25,339	22,089	47,428	3.16%

== Vital statistics ==
=== UN estimates ===
Period	Live births per year	Deaths per year	Natural change per year	CBR*	CDR*	NC*	TFR*	IMR*
1950–1955	6,000	3,000	3,000	45.0	21.6	23.4	6.97	183
1955–1960	7,000	3,000	4,000	45.7	17.7	27.9	6.97	156
1960–1965	8,000	2,000	6,000	45.7	12.6	33.2	7.18	112
1965–1970	8,000	2,000	7,000	41.6	8.7	32.9	6.97	74
1970–1975	8,000	2,000	7,000	35.2	6.5	28.6	5.95	49
1975–1980	10,000	2,000	9,000	33.0	4.8	28.1	5.23	33
1980–1985	13,000	2,000	11,000	32.9	4.1	28.8	4.63	22
1985–1990	14,000	2,000	13,000	31.3	3.6	27.7	4.08	16
1990–1995	14,000	2,000	12,000	26.3	3.3	23.1	3.35	14
1995–2000	14,000	2,000	12,000	23.1	3.2	19.9	2.89	11
2000–2005	14,000	2,000	12,000	21.1	3.0	18.1	2.62	9
2005–2010	21,000	3,000	18,000	20.7	2.8	18.0	2.63	7
* CBR = crude birth rate (per 1000); CDR = crude death rate (per 1000); NC = natural change (per 1000); IMR = infant mortality rate per 1000 births; TFR = total fertility rate (number of children per woman)

=== Registered data ===
Birth registration of Bahrain is available from 1976, death registration started in 1990. Between 1976 and 2011 the number of baby births roughly doubled but the birth rate of babies decreased from 32 to 13 per 1,000. The death rate of Bahrain (1.9 per 1,000 human beings in 2011) is among the lowest in the world.

	Average population	Live births	Deaths	Natural change	Crude birth rate (per 1000)	Crude death rate (per 1000)	Natural change (per 1000)	Crude migration rate (per 1000)	Total fertility rate
1965		5,150							
1966		4,860							
1967		5,179							
1968		5,274							
1971		6,404							
1972		7,274							
1973		7,679							
1974		7,612							
1975		7,767							
1976	282,000	8,984			31.8				
1977	302,000	9,058	872	8,186	30.0	2.9	27.1	62.81	
1978	322,000	9,398	1,002	8,396	29.2	3.1	26.1	36.04	
1979	341,000	9,664	1,037	8,627	28.3	3.0	25.3	30.42	
1980	358,000	10,140	1,085	9,055	28.3	3.0	25.3	22.19	
1981	372,000	10,300	1,065	9,235	27.7	2.9	24.8	13.35	
1982	384,000	11,037	1,119	9,918	28.8	2.9	25.9	5.60	
1983	394,000	11,431	1,064	10,367	29.0	2.7	26.3	−0.93	
1984	405,000	11,519	1,303	10,216	28.5	3.2	25.3	1.94	
1985	417,000	12,314	1,212	11,102	29.5	2.9	26.6	2.15	
1986	431,000	12,893	1,423	11,470	29.9	3.3	26.6	5.87	
1987	446,000	12,699	1,584	11,115	28.5	3.6	24.9	8.71	
1988	462,000	12,555	1,523	11,032	27.2	3.3	23.9	10.75	
1989	478,000	13,611	1,551	12,060	28.5	3.2	25.3	8.24	
1990	493,000	13,370	1,552	11,818	27.1	3.1	24.0	4.42	
1991	503,052	13,229	1,744	11,485	26.1	3.4	22.7	−2.85	
1992	516,458	13,874	1,760	12,114	26.7	3.4	23.3	2.50	
1993	530,225	14,191	1,714	12,477	26.7	3.2	23.5	2.43	
1994	544,366	13,766	1,695	12,071	25.2	3.1	22.1	3.80	
1995	558,879	13,481	1,910	11,571	24.1	3.4	20.7	5.26	
1996	573,792	13,123	1,780	11,343	22.8	3.1	19.7	6.38	
1997	589,115	13,382	1,822	11,560	22.6	3.1	19.5	6.39	
1998	604,842	13,381	1,997	11,384	21.9	3.3	18.6	7.18	
1999	620,989	14,280	1,920	12,360	22.8	3.1	19.7	6.10	2.9
2000	637,582	13,947	2,045	11,902	21.9	3.2	18.7	7.36	2.8
2001	661,317	13,468	1,979	11,489	21.0	3.1	17.9	18.51	2.6
2002	710,554	13,576	2,035	11,541	21.1	3.2	17.9	56.49	2.4
2003	764,519	14,560	2,114	12,446	22.5	3.3	19.2	57.40	2.4
2004	823,744	14,968	2,215	12,753	22.3	3.3	19.0	60.03	2.3
2005	888,824	15,198	2,222	12,976	21.0	3.1	17.9	58.60	2.1
2006	960,425	15,053	2,317	12,736	18.6	2.9	15.7	66.46	2.0
2007	1,039,297	16,062	2,270	13,792	17.4	2.5	14.9	62.80	1.964
2008	1,103,496	17,022	2,390	14,632	16.2	2.3	13.9	44.90	1.968
2009	1,178,415	17,841	2,387	15,454	15.1	2.0	13.1	50.46	1.951
2010	1,228,543	18,150	2,401	15,749	14.8	2.0	12.8	27.99	1.877
2011	1,195,020	17,573	2,528	15,045	14.7	2.1	12.6	−40.65	1.967
2012	1,208,964	19,119	2,613	16,506	15.8	2.2	13.6	−2.12	2.134
2013	1,253,191	19,995	2,588	17,407	16.0	2.1	13.9	21.41	2.157
2014	1,314,562	20,931	2,805	18,126	15.9	2.1	13.8	32.96	2.108
2015	1,370,322	20,983	2,787	18,196	15.3	2.1	13.2	27.42	2.093
2016	1,423,726	20,714	2,858	17,856	14.5	2.0	12.5	24.89	1.984
2017	1,501,116	20,581	2,902	17,679	13.7	1.9	11.8	39.75	1.945
2018	1,503,091	19,740	3,052	16,668	13.1	2.0	11.1	−9.77	1.838
2019	1,483,756	18,611	3,010	15,601	12.5	2.0	10.5	−23.55	1.744
2020	1,472,204	18,042	3,488	14,554	12.3	2.4	9.9	−17.73	1.846
2021	1,504,365	17,805	4,601	13,204	11.8	3.1	8.7	12.60	1.612
2022	1,524,693	17,801	3,521	14,280	11.7	2.3	9.4	3.96	1.640
2023	1,577,059	17,429	3,431	13,998	11.1	2.2	8.9	24.33	1.553
2024	1,588,670	16,787	3,482	13,305	10.6	2.2	8.4	-1.07	1.511
2025	1,603,260								

=== Fertility rate ===
Years	1900	1901	1902	1903	1904	1905	1906	1907	1908	1909
Total Fertility Rate in Bahrain	6.98	6.98	6.98	6.98	6.98	6.98	6.98	6.98	6.98	6.98

Years	1910	1911	1912	1913	1914	1915	1916	1917	1918	1919
Total Fertility Rate in Bahrain	6.98	6.98	6.98	6.98	6.98	6.97	6.97	6.97	6.97	6.97

Years	1920	1921	1922	1923	1924	1925	1926	1927	1928	1929	1930
Total Fertility Rate in Bahrain	6.97	6.97	6.97	6.97	6.97	6.97	6.97	6.97	6.98	6.98	6.98

Years	1931	1932	1933	1934	1935	1936	1937	1938	1939	1940
Total Fertility Rate in Bahrain	6.98	6.99	6.99	6.99	6.99	7	7	7	7	7.01

Years	1941	1942	1943	1944	1945	1946	1947	1948	1949	1950
Total Fertility Rate in Bahrain	7.01	7.01	7.01	7.02	7.02	7.02	7.02	7.03	7.03	7.03

=== Life expectancy ===
Period	Life expectancy in Years	Period	Life expectancy in Years
1950–1955	43.0	1985–1990	71.8
1955–1960	48.5	1990–1995	72.9
1960–1965	55.3	1995–2000	73.9
1965–1970	61.1	2000–2005	74.9
1970–1975	65.4	2005–2010	75.7
1975–1980	68.3	2010–2015	76.4
1980–1985	70.5		

Source: UN World Population Prospects

== Ethnic groups ==
Ethnic groups in Bahrain (2020)
Ethnic groups
Bahraini citizens	46%
Asian (mostly South Asia)	45.5%
other Arabs	5.4%
African	1.6%
European	1%
Others	0.5%

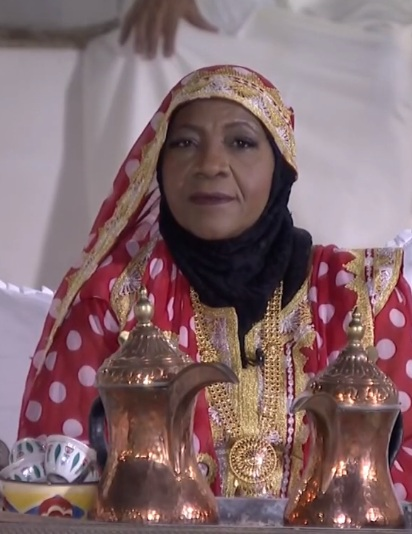
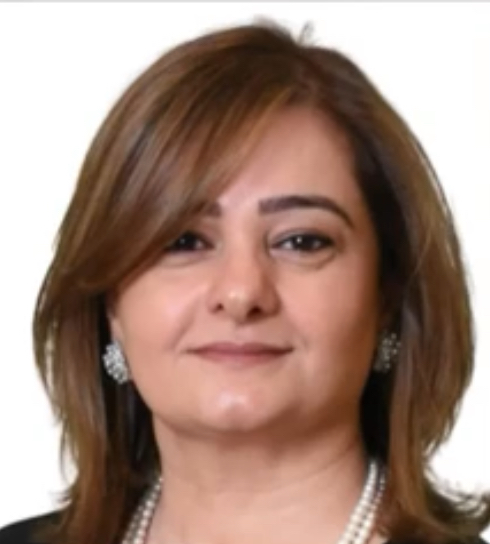
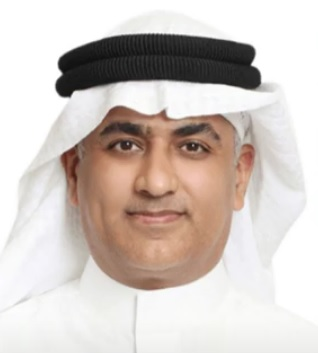
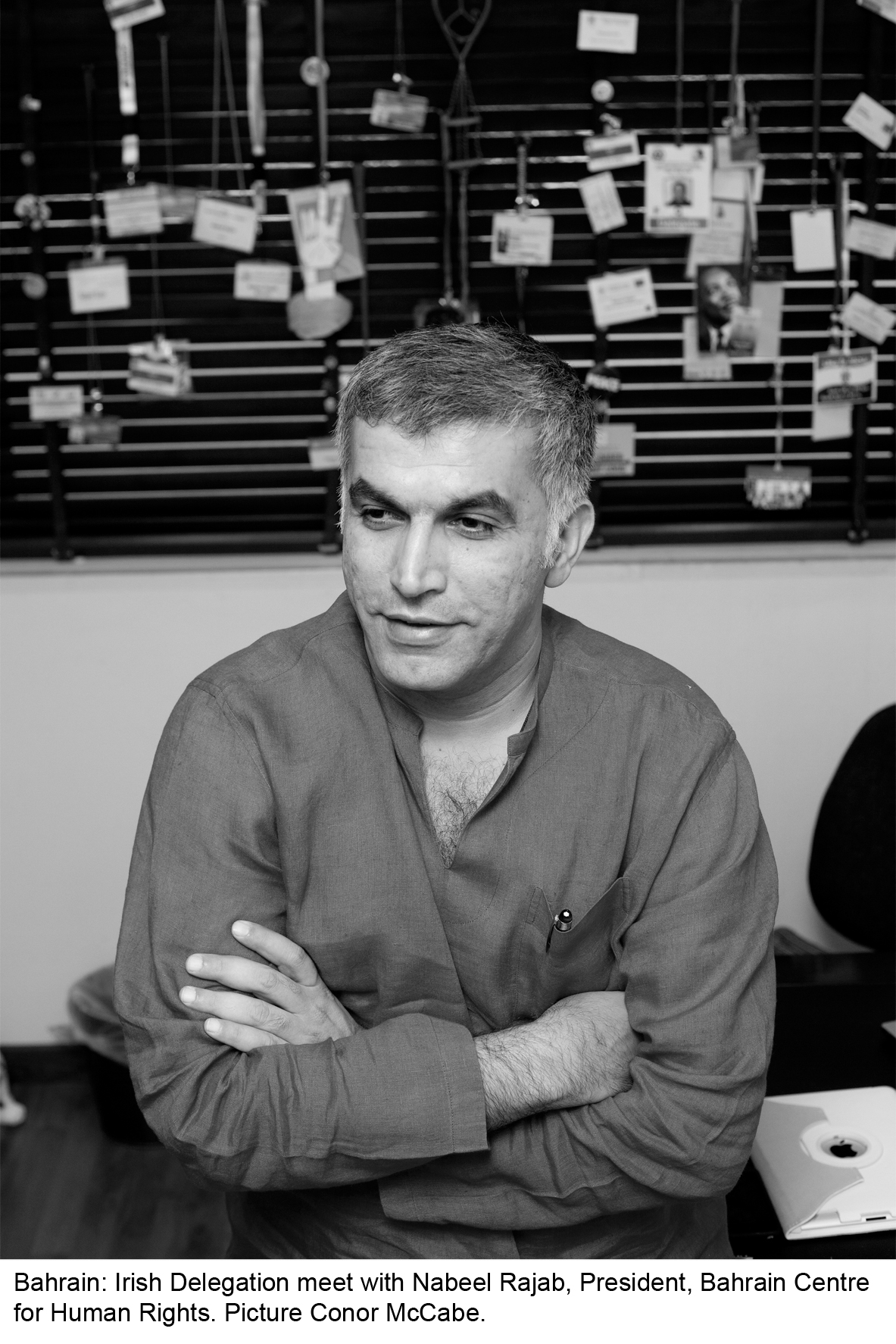
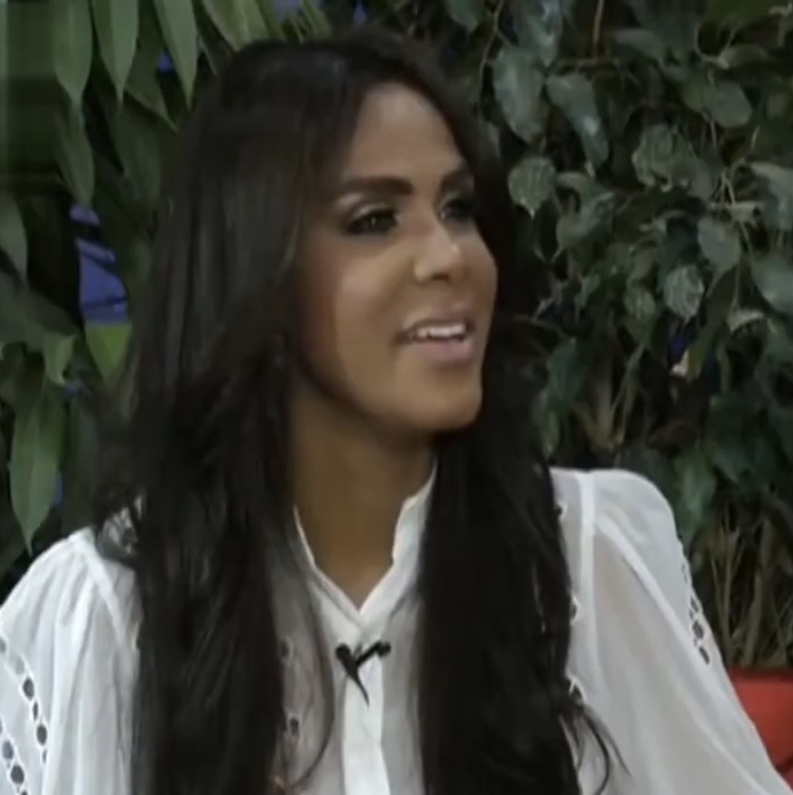
Ethnic diversity of Bahrain

Regarding the ethnicity of Bahrainis, a Financial Times article published on 31 May 1983 found that "Bahrain is a polyglot state, both religiously and racially. Discounting temporary immigrants of the past ten years, there are at least eight or nine communities on the island". Furthermore, sources claim that the government of Bahrain is said to have naturalised Sunnis from different countries to increase the Sunni population in comparison to the Indigenous Shias including people from India, Pakistan, Jordan, Yemen, Syria, Iraq and Egypt. These may be classified as:

Community	Description
Baharna/Bahranis	The indigenous inhabitants of Bahrain. The overwhelming majority are Shia.
Ajams (Iranic and Iranian roots)	Iranic; Lurs (Shia), Achomis (Sunni, Shia), Baluchs (Sunnis), Turkic; Azeris, Qashqai...
Bahraini Jews	Jews have inhabited Bahrain for centuries. Most native Bahraini Jews are of Mesopotamian and Persian descent.
Huwala Arabs	Sunni Arabs who re-migrated back from the southern coasts of Iran
Tribal Arabs	Urbanized Sunni Bahrainis of Bedouin ancestry, such as the Utoob, Dawasir etc.
Najdis	Non-tribal urban Sunni Arabs from Najd in central Arabia.
Afro-Arabs	Descendants of Africans, primarily from East Africa and of mostly Sunni faith
Banyan (Bania)	Indians who traded with Bahrain and settled before the age of oil (formerly known as the Hunood or Banyan, Arabic: البونيان), of mostly Hindu faith.

Non-nationals make up more than half of the population of Bahrain, with immigrants making up about 52.6% of the overall population. Of those, the vast majority come from South and Southeast Asia: according to various media reports and government statistics dated between 2005 and 2012 roughly 350,000 Indians, 150,000 Bangladeshis, 110,000 Pakistanis, 40,000 Filipinos, and 8,000 Indonesians. In 2023, about 4,000 people from the United Kingdom live in Bahrain, although some estimates are double this number.

	Population	Percentage
Bahraini	712,362	47.4%
Other Arabs	86,823	5.8%
African	21,502	1.4%
North American	16,415	1.1%
Asian	650,996	43.4%
European	11,750	0.8%
Others	1,787	0.1%
total	1,501,635	100%

The following is a list containing population estimates from countries' embassies:

Nationality	Population	% of population	Year of data
Bahrain	712,362	51%	2022
India	350,000	25.0%	2015
Bangladesh	110,000	7.88%	2015
Pakistan	100,000	7.16%	2015
Philippines	50,000-60,000	4.30%	2015
Egypt	22,000	1.57%	2015
Sri Lanka	20,000	1.43%	2015
Nepal	20,000	1.43%	2015
Indonesia	10,000	0.71%	2015
UK	9,000	0.64%	2013
USA	8,200	0.58%	2014
Iran	5,000-7,000	0.50%	2015
Jordan	6,000-7,000	0.50%	2015
Sudan	6,000	0.43%	2015
Saudi Arabia	5,000	0.35%	2015
Morocco	4,750	0.34%	2015
Thailand	4,000	0.28%	2015
Iraq	3,500	0.25%	2015
New Zealand	2,500	0.17%	2015
Turkey	2,000	0.14%	2015
Tunisia	1,500	0.10%	2015
China	1,000	<0.1%	2015
Ukraine	400	<0.1%	2015
Malaysia	400	<0.1%	2015
Poland	350	<0.1%	2015
Libya	300-350	<0.1%	2015
Italy	350	<0.1%	2013
Russia	300	<0.1%	2015
Germany	300	<0.1%	2015
Japan	260	<0.1%	2015
South Korea	220	<0.1%	2013
Cyprus	200	<0.1%	2015
Ireland	157	<0.1%	2015
Denmark	150	<0.1%	2015
Switzerland	122	<0.1%	2015
Venezuela	100	<0.1%	2015
Uganda	100	<0.1%	2015
Cameroon	50-100	<0.1%	2015
Sweden	83	<0.1%	2015
Kazakhstan	20	<0.1%	2015
Mongolia	4	<0.1%	2015

=== Genetics ===
==== Ancient DNA and genetic history ====
A 2024 study sequenced whole genomes from four individuals who lived in Bahrain during the Tylos period (circa 300 BCE to 600 CE). The genetic makeup of these ancient Bahrainis revealed a blend of ancestries, primarily tracing back to ancient populations of the Near East. Analysis indicated that their genetic heritage is best described as a mixture of Ancient Anatolia, Levant, and Iran/Caucasus.

Subtle genetic differences were observed among the four individuals, suggesting a degree of population diversity within Bahrain even before the Islamic era. One individual displayed a stronger affinity to Levantine populations, while others showed closer genetic links to groups from Iran and the Caucasus.

Comparing the ancient Bahraini genomes to those of modern populations revealed notable connections. Genetically, the Tylos-period individuals showed closer affinities to present-day inhabitants of Iraq and the Levant than to modern-day Arabians from the peninsula.

==== Malaria adaptation ====
The G6PD Mediterranean mutation, known to provide protection against malaria, was found in three out of the four ancient individuals. Genetic analysis suggests that this mutation began to increase in frequency in Eastern Arabia around 5,000 to 6,000 years ago. This timeframe coincides with the emergence of agriculture in the region, which could have inadvertently created environments conducive to malaria-carrying mosquitoes, thus driving natural selection for malaria resistance.

==== Haplogroups ====
===== Y-chromosome DNA =====
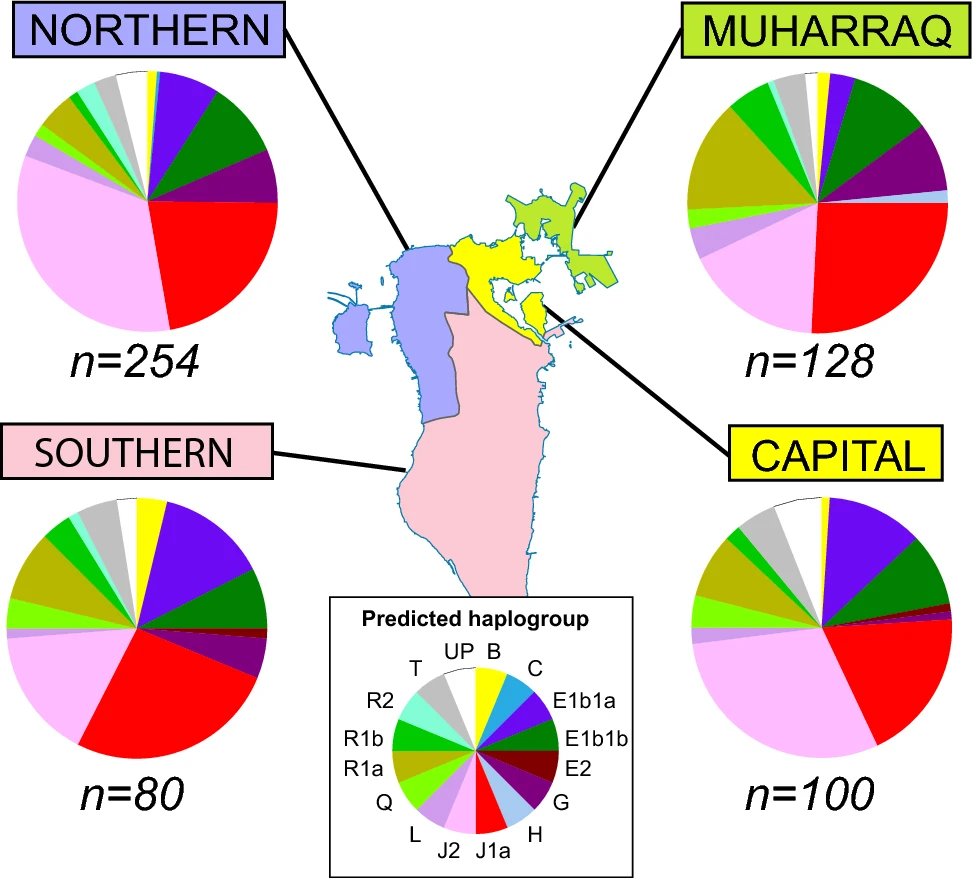
Proportions of predicted Y-DNA haplogroups observed in the four governorates of Bahrain (Study of 2020)

Y-Chromosome DNA (Y-DNA) represents the male lineage. In 2020, a study was made on 562 unrelated Bahraini males. Paternal population structure within Bahrain was investigated using the 27 Y-STRs (short tandem repeats) in the Yfiler Plus kit to generate haplotypes from 562 unrelated Bahraini males, sub-divided into four geographical regions—Northern, Capital, Southern and Muharraq.

Haplogroup prediction indicated diverse origins of the population with a predominance of haplogroups J2 and J1, but also haplogroups such as B2 and E1b1a likely originating in Africa, and H, L and R2 likely indicative of migration from South Asia. Haplogroup frequencies differed significantly between regions, with J2 significantly more common in the Northern region compared with the Southern, possibly due to differential settlement by Baharna, Ajams and Arabs.

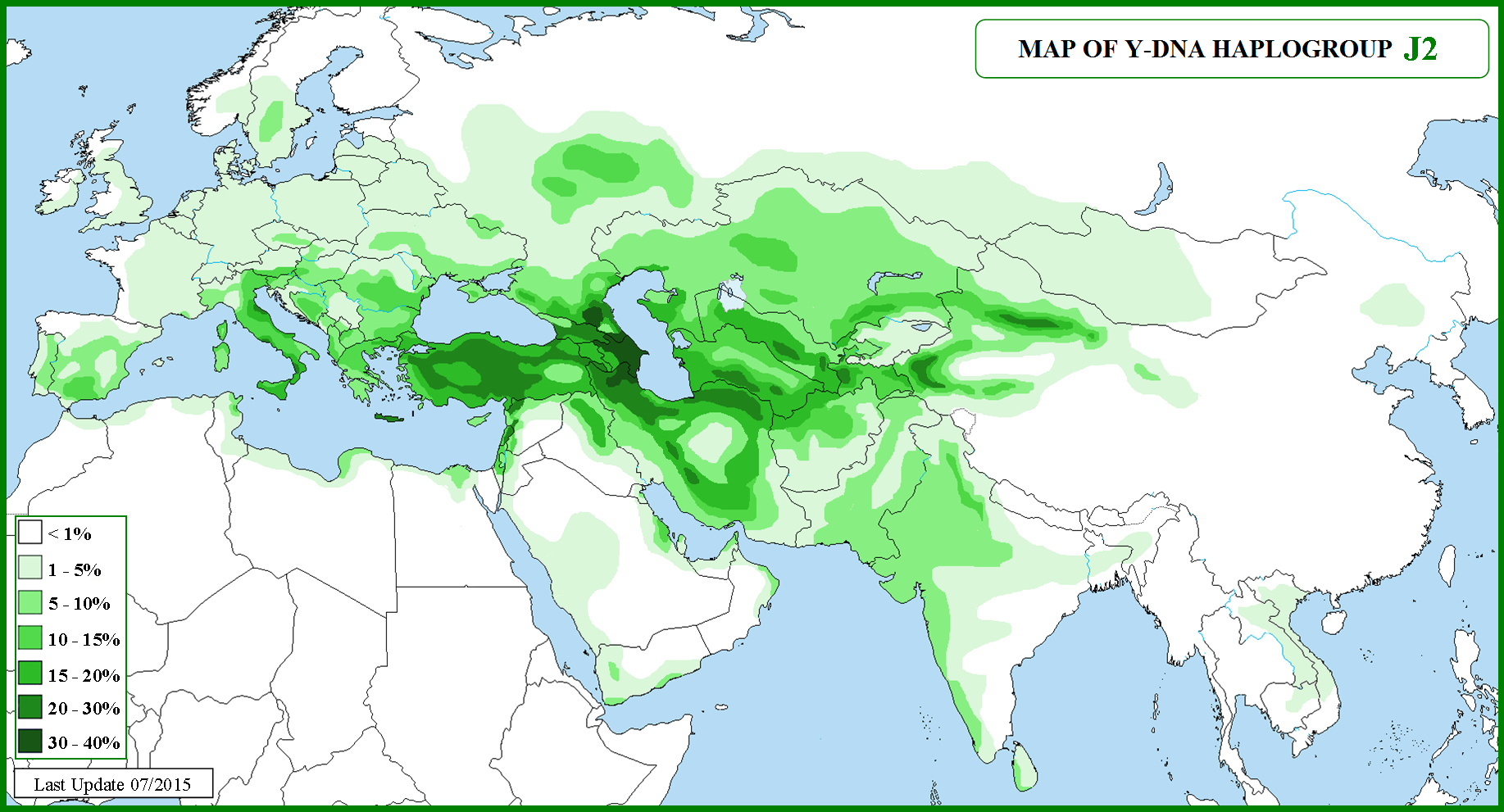
reach of Haplotype J2

Haplogroup prediction suggests that haplogroup J2 is the most common in the Bahraini population (It is thought that J-M172 may have originated in the Caucasus, Anatolia or Western Iran) encompassing 27.6% of the sample, followed by J1 (23.0%), E1b1b (8.9%), E1b1a (8.6%) and R1a (8.4%), with other predicted haplogroups (G, T, L, R1b, Q, R2, B2, E2, H and C) occurring at progressively lower frequencies.

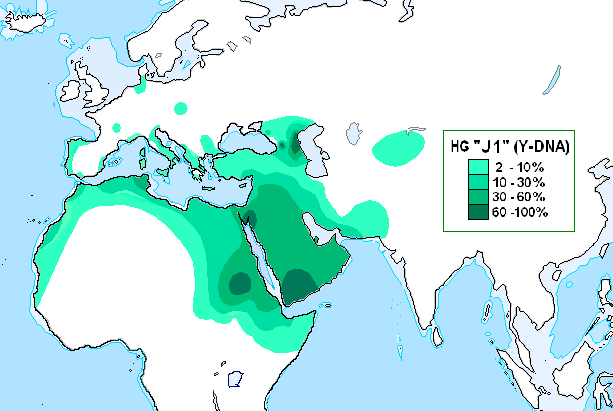
Spread of Haplotype J1

Haplogroup J1 is most frequent in the Southern Governorate (27%) where the highest proportion of Arabs live, and in the Muharraq Governorate (27%) where many migrant Huwala Arabs resettled, and it declines to its lowest frequency in the Northern and Capital Governorates (21% and 19%).

By contrast, the Northern and Capital Governorates where the Baharna and Ajam are most represented show higher frequencies of haplogroup J2 (34% and 31%) than in Muharraq and the Southern Governorate (both 17%).

== Languages ==
- Arabic
- English
- Persian
- Kurdish
- Malayalam
- Urdu
- Balochi
- Konkani
- Hindi
- Sinhalese
- Tamil
- Punjabi
- Bengali
- Armenian
- Filipino
- Italian
- Spanish

== Religion ==
	Men	Women	Total	Bahraini	Non-Bahraini
Muslims	674,329	437,204	1,111,533	710,067	401,466
Others	268,566	121,536	390,102	2,295	387,807
Total	942,895	558,740	1,501,635	712,362	789,273
Muslim %			74.0%	99.7%	50.9%

Religion in Bahrain (ARDA 2020 est.)
1. Shia (52.4%)
2. Sunni (28.2%)
3. Christianity (12.1%)
4. Hinduism (6.38%)
5. None (0.45%)
6. Other (0.52%)

Islam is the official religion forming 74% of the population. Current census data does not differentiate between the other religions in Bahrain, but in 2022, the country was approximately 12% Christian and had about 40 Jewish citizens.

According to the website of Ministry of Information Affairs, 74% of the population are Muslim, with Christians being the second largest religious group, forming 10.2% of the population, Jews making up 0.21%. The percentage of local Bahraini Christians, Jews, Hindus and Baha'is is collectively 0.2%.

Bahraini citizens of Muslim faith belong to the Shi'a and Sunni branches of Islam. The last official census (1941) to include sectarian identification reported 52% (88,298 citizens) as Shia and 48% as Sunni of the Muslim population. Unofficial sources, such as the Library of Congress Country Studies, and The New York Times, estimate sectarian identification to be approximately 45% Sunni and 55% Shia. An official Bahraini document revealed that 51% of the country's citizens are Sunnis, while the Shiite population has declined to 49% of the Muslim population.

Foreigners, overwhelmingly from South Asia and other Arab countries, constituted 52.6% of the population in 2020. Of these, 50.9% are Muslim and 49.1% are non-Muslim, including Christians (primarily: Catholic, Protestant, Syriac Orthodox, and Mar Thoma from South India), Hindus, Buddhists, Baháʼís, and Sikhs.

== See also ==
- Bahranis
