= Chaleh =

Chaleh (Persian: چاله) may refer to:

- Jenah, a city in Hormozgan Province, Iran
- Chaleh, Hamadan, a village in Hamadan province, Iran
- Chaleh, Bastak, a village in Hormozgan Province, Iran
- Chaleh-ye Faramarzan, a village in Hormozgan Province, Iran
- Chaleh, Faryab, a village in Kerman Province, Iran
- Chaleh, Rabor, a village in Kerman Province, Iran
- Chaleh, Khorramabad, a village in Lorestan Province, Iran
- Chaleh, Pol-e Dokhtar, a village in Lorestan Province, Iran
- Chaleh, Qazvin, a village in Qazvin Province, Iran

== See also ==
- Chaleh is a common element in Iranian place names; see
