= Darbast =

Darbast or Dar Bast (Persian: داربست) may refer to:

- Darbast, Fars
- Darbast, Bashagard, Hormozgan Province
- Darbast, Bastak, Hormozgan Province
- Darbast 1, Kerman Province
- Darbast, Sistan and Baluchestan
