= Dokhtar-e Shayesteh =

Former Iranian beauty pageant

Dokhtar-e Shayesteh (Persian: دختر شایسته ایران, lit. Miss Iran) was an annual Iranian beauty pageant organized by the women's magazine Zan-e Rooz from 1965 until the Iranian Revolution in 1979. The winner represented Iran at international beauty pageants, including Teen Princess and later Miss Teenage Intercontinental.

== History ==
The pageant was conceived by journalist and editor Majid Davami, founder and editor-in-chief of Zan-e Rooz, after a journalism study trip to the United States. Upon returning to Iran, Davami proposed creating a modern women's magazine together with a national beauty pageant to Mostafa Mesbahzadeh, founder of the Kayhan Institute. The proposal was approved, and Zan-e Rooz was launched in 1965.

Forough Mesbahzadeh served as manager of Zan-e Rooz, while Davami directed the editorial content and developed the concept and organization of the beauty pageant. The competition was organized by Zan-e Rooz, a publication of the Kayhan Institute.

The first competition was held in 1965 under the title Dokhtar-e Bahar ("Spring Girl"). Beginning in 1966, it became an annual competition under the name Dokhtar-e Shayesteh ("Miss Iran"). Winners represented Iran at the international Teen Princess competition from 1966 to 1974 and at Miss Teenage Intercontinental from 1975 to 1978. The competition ended following the 1979 Iranian Revolution.

== Winners ==
- 1965 – Sima Izadjou (Dokhtar-e Bahar)
- 1966 – Mitra Nikanpour
- 1967 – Shahla Vahabzadeh
- 1968 – Elaheh Azodi
- 1969 – Rita Jebelli
- 1970 – Sholeh Zand
- 1971 – Mahvash Sobhi
- 1972 – Roya Rouhani-Moghadam
- 1973 – Sousan Hakima
- 1974 – Soheila Jorjani
- 1975 – Shahoreh Nikpour
- 1976 – Jelveh Palizban
- 1977 – Afsaneh Bani Ardalan
- 1978 – Taraneh Kaysar

== Gallery ==
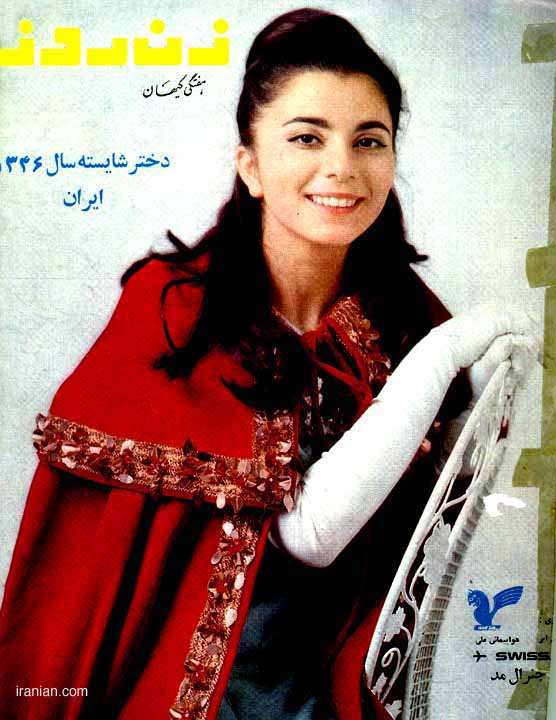
Zan-e Rooz cover featuring Shahla Vahabzadeh, winner of Dokhtar-e Shayesteh (Miss Iran), 1967

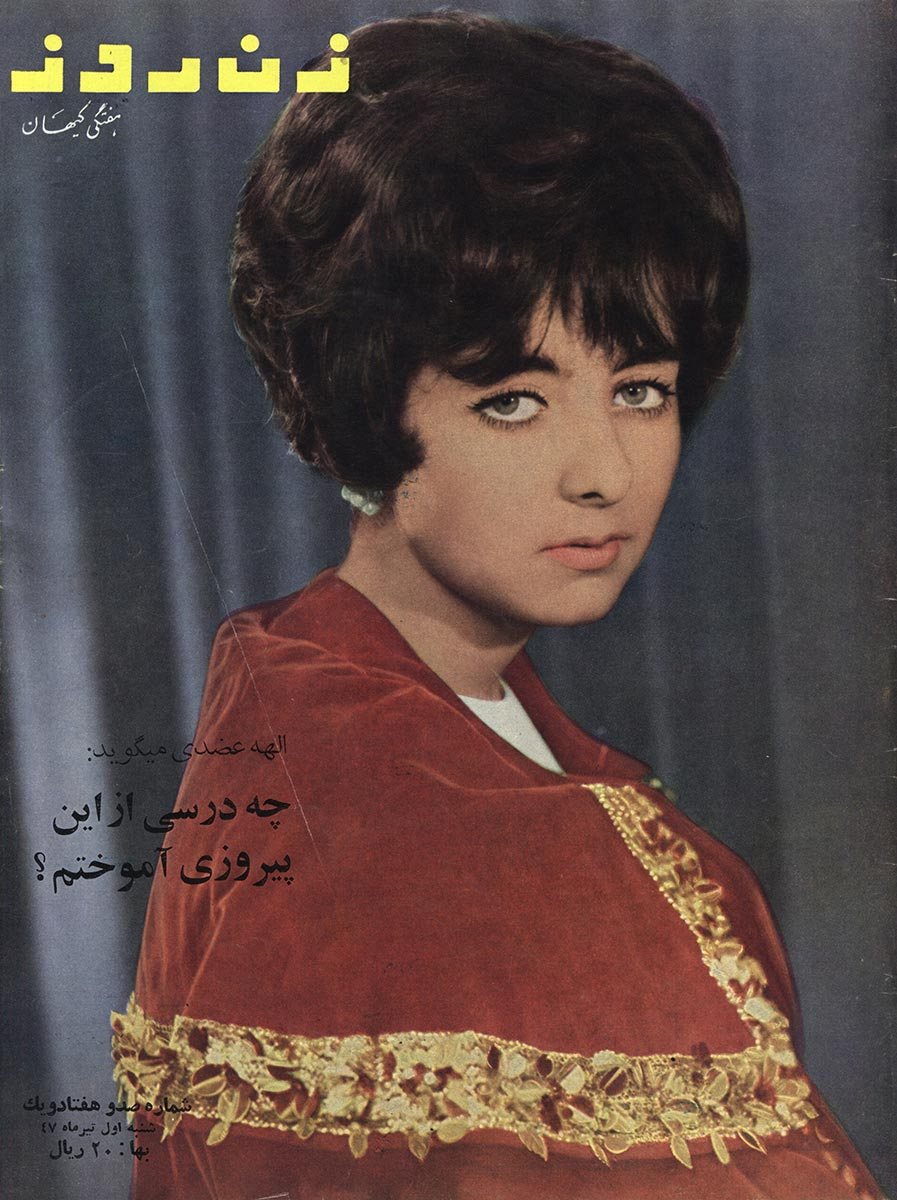
Zan-e Rooz cover featuring Elaheh Azodi, winner of Dokhtar-e Shayesteh (Miss Iran), 1968

== See also ==
- Zan-e Rooz
- Kayhan
- Majid Davami
