= Amir Taheri =

Iranian author (born 1942)

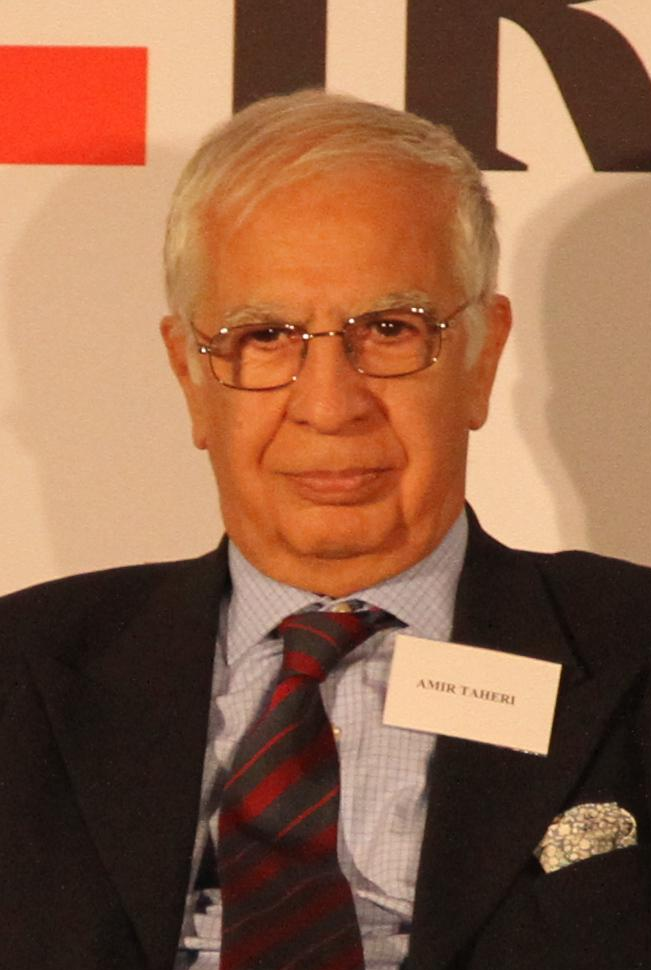
- Taheri in 2011
- Born: Ahvaz, Iran
- Occupations: Journalist, politician Chairman of Gatestone Institute
- Known for: Editor-in-chief of Kayhan (1972–1979)

Amir Taheri (Persian: امیر طاهری; born 9 June 1942) is an Iranian-born journalist, author, intellectual, scholar of Middle Eastern politics and activist based in Europe. His writings focus on the Middle East affairs and topics related to Islamic terrorism.

Taheri was the executive editor-in-chief of Pahlavi Iran's largest daily Kayhan from 1972 until the Iranian Revolution of 1979. He has been the chairman of Gatestone Institute in Europe since 2008.

== Career ==
Taheri was born in Ahvaz. His biography at Benador Associates stated that he was educated in Tehran, London, and Paris. He became involved in journalism as the editor of his school magazine between 1955 and 1958, and wrote for literary magazines and weeklies in his youth.

In 1967, he was appointed cultural editor of Kayhan International, the English-language foreign edition of Kayhan, the "strongly pro-Shah" daily and the largest newspaper in Iran. From 1968 to 1972, he worked as the paper's political editor.

From 1972 to 1979, Taheri was the executive editor-in-chief of Kayhan. He sat on the board of trustees of the Institute for International Political and Economic Studies in Tehran from 1973 to 1979, and chaired the board of the Iran Computer magazine. In the mid-1970s, he was a member (alongside Manouchehr Azmoun, Mohammad Baheri, Ahmad Fardid, Houchang Nahavandi, Ehsan Naraghi and Enayatollah Reza) of a select committee of monarchist, mostly ex-Marxist intellectuals tasked by the Shah with developing a new "dialectical" philosophy based on Shia mysticism that portrayed the regime's foreign policy as independent and set out the goal of a "Shah–People Revolution". Although the project was interrupted by the Iranian Revolution of 1979, it influenced the slogans and trajectory of the new Islamic regime.

Following the Iranian Revolution, Taheri emigrated to Europe and lived between Paris and London. By 1980, he became a columnist for the International Herald Tribune (for which he wrote until 1992) and The Washington Post. He was the Middle East correspondent and editor for the London Sunday Times from 1980 to 1984, the editor-in-chief of the French weekly Jeune Afrique from 1984 to 1987, and a member of the executive board of the International Press Institute from 1984 to 2000, liaising with UNESCO in Paris on its behalf. In 1984, he helped Mostafa Mesbahzadeh launch the diaspora weekly Kayhan London. He served as a political adviser on Afghanistan to the Secretary-General of the United Nations Javier Pérez de Cuéllar from 1988 to 1989, chairing seminars held in Geneva, Paris, and New York.

He has written columns (often as an "op ed" writer) for Asharq Al-Awsat and its sister publication Arab News (since 1987), the New York Post (2003–2018), The Wall Street Journal, The New York Times, Los Angeles Times, and Newsday. He has also contributed to Die Welt (as editorial writer 1989–1995), Der Spiegel, in Germany, La Repubblica in Italy, L'Express, Politique internationale (where he is part of the Consulting Committee) and Le Nouvel Observateur in France, El Mundo in Spain, The Daily Telegraph, The Guardian, The Daily Mail and The Times in the UK, the German weekly Focus magazine, the National Review in the United States, and the Daily Times in Pakistan.

Taheri is a commentator for CNN and is frequently interviewed by other media, including the BBC and the RFI. He has written several TV documentaries dealing with various issues of the Muslim world. He has interviewed many world leaders including Presidents Richard Nixon, Gerald Ford, Jimmy Carter, Ronald Reagan and Bill Clinton, King Faisal, Mikhail Gorbachev, President Anwar Sadat, Zhou Enlai, Indira Gandhi and Chancellor Helmut Kohl. His political stance, in particular within the Iranian opposition, has been characterised as conservative, and he has praised Frédéric Bastiat anachronistically as "the rediscovered French challenger to [Karl] Marx".

In 2003, he was cited as a "noted terrorism expert" by the United Nations Security Council's monitoring group on al-Qaida and the Taliban, led by Michael Chandler. In 2006, he wrote in the Sunday Times that "today the visible Islam, the loudest Islam, is a political movement masquerading as a religion". He became the European chairman of the far-right American think tank Gatestone Institute in 2008.

In January 2013, ahead of the 2013 Iranian presidential election, he gave a talk on Political Opposition in Iran: Challenges and Opportunities in the House of Commons of the United Kingdom that was followed by a similar intervention from Reza Pahlavi on the following day. In 2023, he was reported to be a close ally of Reza Pahlavi whose accession to the Alliance for Freedom and Democracy in Iran had allegedly been blocked by the resigning Hamed Esmaeilion.

Taheri has published several books, some of which have been translated into 20 languages. In 1988 Publishers Weekly in New York chose his study of Islamist terrorism, Holy Terror: Inside the World of Islamic Terrorism, as one of the best books of the year. His most recent book, Persian Night: Iran under the Khomeinist Revolution (2009), discusses the Islamic Republic's history, current political landscape, and geopolitical ambitions.

== Controversies and fabrications ==
Taheri has been the subject of many controversies involving allegations of producing fabrications in his writings, the most notable of which was the 2006 Iranian sumptuary law controversy.

=== Nest of Spies ===
Shaul Bakhash, a historian in Mideast history at George Mason University, wrote in a review of Taheri's 1989 book Nest of Spies in The New Republic that Taheri concocts conspiracies in his writings, and noted that he "repeatedly refers us to books where the information he cites simply does not exist. Often the documents cannot be found in the volumes he attributes them.... [He] repeatedly reads things into the documents that are not there." Bakhash stated that Taheri's 1989 Nest of Spies is "the sort of book that gives contemporary history a bad name".

=== Claims of Osama bin Laden's death in 2002 ===
Taheri's byline was attached to an op-ed in The New York Times of 11 July 2002 under the title "The Death of bin Ladenism". His clip claimed, "Osama bin Laden is dead. The news first came from sources in Afghanistan and Pakistan almost six months ago".

=== Iranian sumptuary law hoax ===
On 19 May 2006, the National Post of Canada published two pieces, one by Taheri, claiming that the Iranian parliament passed a law that "envisages separate dress codes for religious minorities, Christians, Jews and Zoroastrians, who will have to adopt distinct colour schemes to make them identifiable in public." Numerous other sources, including Maurice Motamed, the Jewish member of the Iranian parliament, refuted the report as untrue. The Associated Press later refuted the report as well, saying that "a draft law moving through parliament encourages Iranians to wear Islamic clothing to protect the country's Muslim identity but does not mention special attire for religious minorities, according to a copy obtained Saturday by the Associated Press." Reuters also reported that "A copy of the bill obtained by Reuters contained no such references. Reuters correspondents who followed the dress code session in parliament as it was broadcast on state radio heard no discussion of prescriptions for religious minorities."

Taheri insisted that his report was correct and that "the dress code law has been passed by the Islamic Majlis and will now be submitted to the Council of Guardians", claiming that "special markers for followers of Judaism, Christianity and Zoroastrianism are under discussion as a means to implement the law".

The National Post retracted the story several hours after posting it online. The newspaper blamed Taheri for the falsehood in the article, and published a full apology on 24 May. Taheri stood by his article.

Taheri's PR agent Eliana Benador defended his story. "Benador explained that, regarding Iran, accuracy is 'a luxury...As much as being accurate is important, in the end it's important to side with what's right. What's wrong is siding with the terrorists.'"

=== Khomeni quotation ===
In 2007, Rudy Giuliani campaign adviser Norman Podhoretz wrote an article in Commentary magazine called "The Case for Bombing Iran," which included the following quotation (allegedly from Ayatollah Khomeini): "We do not worship Iran, we worship Allah. For patriotism is another name for paganism. I say let this land [Iran] burn. Let this land go up in smoke, provided Islam emerges triumphant in the rest of the world." The quotation, which was later repeated by Podhoretz on the PBS NewsHour, and by Michael Ledeen in National Review, surprised Bakhash, who had never heard it before and found it out of character for Khomeni. Bakhash traced the quotation back to a book by Taheri and reported that "no one can find the book Taheri claimed as his source in the Library of Congress or a search of Persian works in libraries worldwide. The statement itself can't be found in databases and published collections of Khomeini statements and speeches."

=== Javad Zarif accusations ===
Dwight Simpson of San Francisco State University and Kaveh Afrasiabi have written that Taheri and his publisher Eliana Benador fabricated false stories in the New York Post in 2005 where Taheri identified Iran's UN ambassador Javad Zarif as one of the students involved in the 1979 seizure of hostages at the US Embassy in Tehran. Zarif was Simpson's teaching assistant and a graduate student in the Department of International Relations of San Francisco State University.

=== Hoax of Hanging of Gay Teenagers in Isfahan ===
In July 2015, days after the signing of the Joint Comprehensive Plan of Action, Taheri tweeted that "14-year-old Akbar Zargarzadeh hanged from a tree in Islamic boys' camp after camp's mullah accused him of being gay deserving death." Shortly afterward, American LGBT activist Scott Long contacted Iranian queer organizations and Persian-speaking people, and found out that Taheri's claim was a hoax.

== Partial bibliography ==
- 1986. The Spirit of Allah: Khomeini and the Islamic Revolution.
  Bethesda: Adler & Adler. ISBN 0-917561-04-X, ISBN 978-0-917561-04-7. ASIN 091756104X.
- 1987. Holy Terror: Inside the World of Islamic Terrorism.
  Bethesda: Adler & Adler. ISBN 0-917561-45-7, ISBN 978-0-917561-45-0. ASIN 0917561457.
- 1988. The Cauldron: The Middle East Behind the Headlines.
  London: Hutchinson. ISBN 0-09-173729-X, ISBN 978-0-09-173729-0. ASIN 009173729X.
- 1989. Nest of Spies: America's Journey to Disaster in Iran.
  New York: Pantheon Books. ISBN 0-394-57566-0, ISBN 978-0-394-57566-7. ASIN 0394575660.
- 1989. Crescent in a Red Sky: The Future of Islam in the Soviet Union.
  London: Hutchinson. ISBN 0-09-173463-0, ISBN 978-0-09-173463-3.
- 1991. The Unknown Life of the Shah.
  London: Hutchinson. ISBN 0-09-174860-7, ISBN 978-0-09-174860-9. ASIN 0091748607.
- 2009. The Persian Night: Iran under the Khomeinist Revolution.
  New York City: Encounter Books. ISBN 1-59403-240-8
