= Gezeh, Hormozgan =

Gezeh گزه
- Village
- Location within Iran
- Coordinates: 27°03′30″N 54°03′47″E
- Country: Iran
- Province: Hormozgan
- County: Bastak
- Bakhsh: Jenah
- Rural District: Faramarzan

Population (2006)
  - Total: 516
- Time zone: UTC+3:30 (IRST)
  - Summer (DST): UTC+4:30 (IRDT)

Gezeh (Persian: گزه, also Romanized as Gazeh; also known as Gaza) is a village in Faramarzan Rural District, Jenah District, Bastak County, Hormozgan Province, Iran. At the 2006 census, its population was 516, in 108 families.
