= Khamar (disambiguation) =

Khamar may refer to:

- Khamar, a village in Yemen
- Khamar, Republic of Dagestan, a rural locality in Russia
- Khamar-e Qalandaran, a village in Iran
- Khamar Monastery, a Buddhist monastic center in Mongolia
- Khamar-Daban, a mountain range in Siberia
