= Deh Now-e Qalandaran =

Deh Now-e Qalandaran دهنوقلندران
- Village
- Location within Iran
- Coordinates: 27°04′29″N 53°58′47″E
- Country: Iran
- Province: Hormozgan
- County: Bastak
- Bakhsh: Jenah
- Rural District: Faramarzan

Population (2006)
  - Total: 135
- Time zone: UTC+3:30 (IRST)
  - Summer (DST): UTC+4:30 (IRDT)

Deh Now-e Qalandaran (Persian: دهنوقلندران, also Romanized as Deh Now-e Qalandarān; also known as Deh Now) is a village in Faramarzan Rural District, Jenah District, Bastak County, Hormozgan Province, Iran. At the 2006 census, its population was 135, in 27 families.
