= Sadreddin Elahi =

Iranian journalist (1934–2021)

- صدرالدین الهی
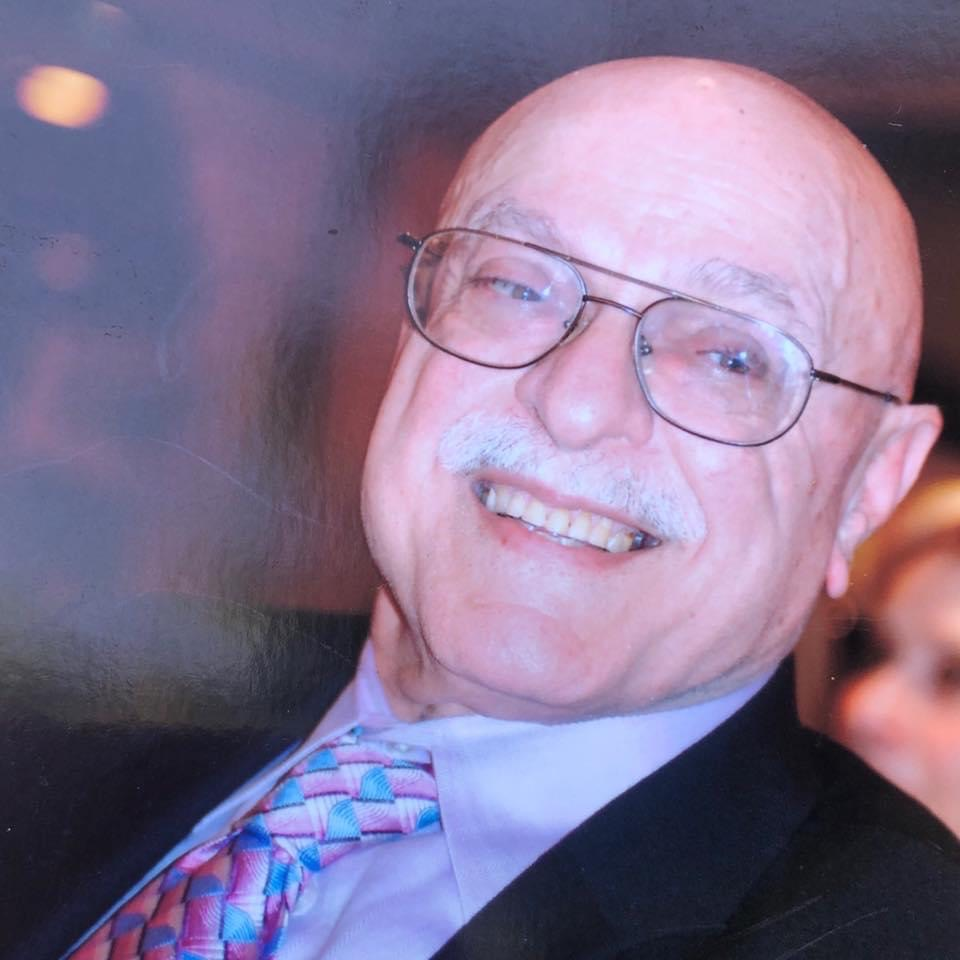
- Born: 4 December 1934; Tehran, Iran
- Died: 29 December 2021 (aged 87); Walnut Creek, California
- Other names: Sepideh (سپیده), Taak (تاک), Arghanoon (ارغنون),
- Occupation: Journalist
- Known for: Founder of Kayhan Varzeshi

Academic background
- Education: University of Tehran (B.A); Press Institute of France (DU); École normale supérieure (Paris) (DESA); University of Tours (Orléans) (D.Litt)
- Thesis: La Formation Des Cadres De L'Education Physique Et Du Sport En Iran: une contribution au progrès pour les pays en développement (1970)

Academic work
- Institutions: University of California, Berkeley, San Jose State University, The College of Mass Communications, Tehran

Sadreddin Elahi (Persian: صدرالدین الهی; 4 December 1934 – 29 December 2021) was an Iranian journalist, professor, activist, and author. He is often referred to as the "Pioneer of Modern Iranian Journalism". He served as dean of the Department of Radio and Television Journalism at The College of Mass Communications in Tehran, and taught in the United States at the University of California, Berkeley and San Jose State University.

== Life and career ==
Sadreddin Elahi was born on 4 December 1934, in the Sarcheshmeh neighborhood of Tehran. His family, who were originally from Lavasan-e Bozorg, settled in Tehran after it became the capital.

After completing his primary and secondary education in Tehran, Elahi earned his bachelor's degree in Persian literature from the University of Tehran in 1959. While still in his last year of high school (1954), he joined the Kayhan newspaper (now Kayhan London), founded by his first-cousin, Mostafa Mesbahzadeh. He is known as the founder of modern journalism in Iran and founded the weekly Kayhan Varzeshi (Kayhan Sports), which was first published in the fall of 1956 in Tehran and still continues. In this publication, he was the first to address psychological and sociological issues in sports, as well as the philosophy of physical education.

As a reporter for Kayhan and Kayhan Varzeshi, Elahi reported from the fronts of the 1958 Lebanese Civil War, the Algerian Liberation Wars, the Asian Games in Tokyo 1958 and Bangkok 1966, the 1964 Olympic Games in Tokyo and the 1976 Olympic Games in Montreal. In parallel with his work in Kayhan and Kayhan Varzeshi, Elahi wrote several pieces of paa-vararaghi (serial novels) for Tehran Mossavar and Sepid o Siah magazines while also conducting interviews with political and literary figures in Iran and surrounding countries.

He received a Diplôme universitaire (DU) in advanced studies of Information Sciences from The Press Institute of France in 1970, and concurrently pursued a Diplôme d'Études Supérieur Appliqué (DESA) in Physical Education and Sports from École normale supérieure (Paris) where he wrote his thesis on the training of physical education and sport managers in Iran, focusing on progress within developing countries (La Formation Des Cadres De L'Education Physique Et Du Sport En Iran: une contribution au progrès pour les pays en développement). Elahi finally received a Doctor of Letters (D.Litt.) in Political Sociology of Sports from the University of Tours (Orléans) in 1971. Elahi served as the dean of the Department of Radio and Television Journalism at The College of Mass Communications in Tehran from 1971 to 1979. He took a sabbatical leave in 1978 and was a visiting lecturer at San Jose State University and the University of California at Berkeley. After the Islamic Revolution, he chose a life of exile and continued his writing and research in the United States.

== Interviews ==
Elahi conducted interviews with political and literary figures in Iran and abroad, with the likes of Pierre-Henri Simon, Lord Killanin, Hassan Ali Mansour, Ahmed Ben Bella, and Camille Chamoun; he was one of few who were able to interview Iranian poet, Shahriar, while he was in seclusion. One of his most notable interviews was with Seyyed Zia'eddin, in 1963, which was the topic of his fourth book, published in 2011.

== Personal life and death ==
In 1955, Elahi married Etrat Goudarzi; they have two children: Borzoo and Baran. On 29 December 2021, Elahi passed away in Walnut Creek, California at 87 years old. Following his death, notable Iranian figures such as Reza Pahlavi, Farah Pahlavi, and Masih Alinejad, made public statements commemorating the work he had done and sending their condolences.

== Bibliography ==
- Doori-ha va Delghiri-ha, Taak Publishing 2000 (ISBN 9781595841582)
- Naghde Bee Ghash – Collected Conversations of Sadreddin Elahi with Parviz Khanlari, Taak Publishing 2007 (ISBN 9781930720015)
- Ba Saadi dar Bazercheh Zendeghi, Ketap Corp. 2008 (ISBN 1930720009)
- Sayyid Zia, the First or Second Man of the Coup?, Ketab Corp. 2011 (ISBN 9781595843128)
- Tefl Sad Salehe Beh Name Sherno, Taak Publishing 2016 (ISBN 9781532312489)
- Maghaleh ha va Moghooleha, Taak Publishing 2018 (ISBN 1717592929)
