= Abdolrahman Faramarzi =

Iranian journalist, writer, educator, deputy of parliament and poet (1897–1972)

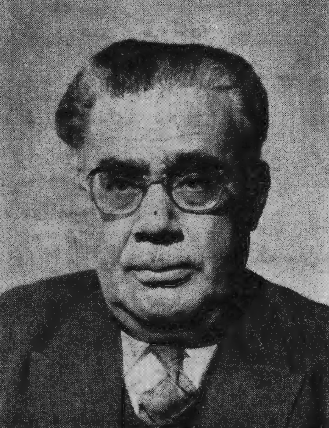
Faramarzi, pictured in the late 1950s

Abdulrahman Faramarzi (Note: Also spelled "Abdurrahman".) (Persian: عبدالرحمن فرامرزی; 11 August 1897 – 11 July 1972) was an Iranian journalist, writer, educator, parliamentarian and poet. He was born in Gachuyeh, Faramarzan, Bastak, Hormozgan province, and died in the capital Tehran. Together with Mostafa Mesbahzadeh, Faramarzi co-founded Kayhan newspaper. He was also the founder of the short-lived Bahram newspaper. Faramarzi was buried in the Behesht-e Zahra cemetery in Tehran.
