= Gereh Kuh =

Coordinates: 27.1480°N 54.8344°E

Gereh Kuh گره كوه
- Village
- Interactive map of Gereh Kuh
- Country: Iran
- Province: Hormozgan
- County: Bastak
- Bakhsh: Jenah
- Rural District: Jenah

Population (2006)
  - Total: 58
- Time zone: UTC+3:30 (IRST)
  - Summer (DST): UTC+4:30 (IRDT)

Gereh Kuh (Persian: گره كوه, also Romanized as Gereh Kūh) is a village in Jenah Rural District, Jenah District, Bastak County, Hormozgan Province, Iran. At the 2006 census, its population was 58, in 12 families.
