= Konar-e Siah, Bastak =

Konar-e Siah كنارسياه
- Village
- Location within Iran
- Coordinates: 27°04′11″N 53°55′56″E
- Country: Iran
- Province: Hormozgan
- County: Bastak
- Bakhsh: Jenah
- Rural District: Faramarzan

Population (2006)
  - Total: 1,029
- Time zone: UTC+3:30 (IRST)
  - Summer (DST): UTC+4:30 (IRDT)

Konar-e Siah (Persian: كنارسياه, also Romanized as Konār-e Sīāh, Kenār Sāyeh, Kenār Seyāh, and Konār-e Seyāh; also known as Kunārsiāh and Kuner Sīāh) is a village in Faramarzan Rural District, Jenah District, Bastak County, Hormozgan Province, Iran. At the 2006 census, its population was 1,029, in 185 families.
