= Reception and legacy of Muhammad Khatami =

Views on the fifth president of Iran

Iranian president Mohammad Khatami's two terms as president were criticized by conservatives, reformers, and opposition groups for various policies and viewpoints.

== Governance ==
Mohammad Khatami is a strong advocate of "Islamic republic" or an original Iranian form of administration. In a speech on 11 October 2009, he warned that oppression of his allies and reformists will lead to emergence of those who are against Islamic republic constitution. He said "unfortunately we are witnessing the emergence of nuclei that negate the very basis of the Islamic republic." Khatami however respects the opinion of people strongly and yet believes that the optimum form of government differ for each nation and cannot be copied from the west.

Khatami has been always respectful of Iran's supreme leader Ali Khamenei and has often indirectly criticized his remarks during his presidential terms. In many controversial issues such as Iranian parliamentary election in 2004 and Iranian presidential election in 2009, Khatami did not stand strongly against the position of the supreme leader. Supreme leader of Iran appointed Ahmad Jannati and Mohammad Yazdi, two of the most well known fundamentalists to head the judiciary system and Guardian Council of Iran. Khatami has been always a critic of IRIB, Judiciary system and Guardian Council. The organizations run under the supervision of Iran's supreme leader.

Khatami came under attack from philosopher Abdolkarim Soroush, who accused him of failing to push for reforms since his May 1997 election. "The peaceful and democratic uprising of the Iranian people against religious dictatorship in May 1997 was a sweet experience," Soroush said in a letter addressed to Khatami. "But your failure to keep the vote and your wasting of opportunities put an end to it and disappointed the nation. Now, failures have turned into unrest."

President Khatami responded to Iranian Shirin Ebadi's Nobel Peace Prize by waiting several days and then tempering his congratulations by saying "The Nobel prize for peace is not that important, as it is usually bestowed on political considerations."

== Accusations of foreign agency ==
Khatami has been accused of being a "foreign agent" multiple times.

In a lengthy 2008 report published by the official Islamic Republic News Agency (IRNA), it was claimed that Khatami participated in the meeting because they wanted to "transform Khatami into an Islamic version of Mikhail Gorbachev" and he was executor of the plot to "replace religious rule with secularism". In 2009, Kayhan claimed that Khatami was invited to attend the meeting in 2006 again.

In the 2009 Iran poll protests trials, Khatami was accused by Kian Tajbakhsh of working with the Open Society Foundations to foment a velvet revolution in Iran. Tajbakhsh told the court that Khatami had met Soros in New York City, where Mohammad Javad Zarif was also present. Later, Kayhan reported that they met twice: first time in the Trump International Hotel, New York on 14 September 2006 and the second time at the 38th session of the World Economic Forum in Davos, Switzerland in January 2007. Hossein Shariatmadari has also written in the editorial on 29 December 2010 that Khatami was executing the plans prescribed by Gene Sharp and Richard Rorty.

Khatami has denied the claims, calling them "lies". Soros has also strongly denied the allegations.

== See also ==
- Religious intellectualism in Iran
