= 2006 Iranian sumptuary law hoax =

False Canadian news report

On May 19, 2006, the National Post in Canada published an article titled "Iran Eyes Badges for Jews: Law would require non-Muslim insignia" by Iranian in exile Amir Taheri alleging that the Iranian parliament had passed a sumptuary law mandating a national dress code for all Iranians, Muslim and non-Muslim alike.

The article went on to say that non-Muslim religious minorities in Iran would be required to wear "special insignia": yellow for Jews, red for Christians and blue for Zoroastrians. According to the article by Taheri, "the new codes would enable Muslims to easily recognize non-Muslims so that they can avoid shaking hands with them by mistake, and thus becoming najis (ritually unclean)".

Numerous other sources, including Maurice Motamed, the Jewish member of the Iranian parliament and the Iranian Embassy in Canada, refuted the report as untrue. The National Post later retracted the original article and published an article, to the contrary ("Experts say report of badges for Jews in Iran is untrue").

The original article listed only "human rights groups" and "Iranian expatriates living in Canada" as its sources. Amir Taheri made a statement on May 22, 2006, saying the National Post story he authored was used by "a number of reports that somehow jumped the gun" and that he stands by the article.

On May 24, 2006, the National Post issued an apology for the reports that the Iranian law would "require Jews and other religious minorities in Iran to wear badges... We apologize for the mistake and for the consternation it has caused not just National Post readers, but the broader public who read the story."

== Reaction ==
In a follow-up article, the National Post quoted Meir Javedanfar, an Israeli expert on Iran and the Middle East, as saying that the Islamic dress law contained no requirements of special insignia, and that "The Iranian people would never stand for" them and "The Iranian government wouldn't be stupid enough to do it." The Associated Press stated that "a draft law moving through parliament encourages Iranians to wear Islamic clothing to protect the country's Muslim identity but does not mention special attire for religious minorities, according to a copy obtained Saturday by The Associated Press." Reuters also reported that "A copy of the bill obtained by Reuters contained no such references. Reuters correspondents who followed the dress code session in parliament as it was broadcast on state radio heard no discussion of proscriptions for religious minorities."

Iranian commentator Ali Reza Nourizadeh said that a motion had been made to impose such requirements, but that it had never come close to becoming law. Meir Jawadnafar, an Iranian exile living in Israel, called the report "baseless" in an interview with the Toronto Star.

According to Kayhan, the Iranian foreign ministry called the Canadian Ambassador to Iran for an explanation and apology. Some Iranian journalists and analysts asked the Iranian government to file a case in international court against the National Post, as BBC Persian reported.

Canada's Prime Minister Stephen Harper reacted to the report during a news conference with Australian Prime Minister John Howard. Harper said the Iranian regime is "very capable of this kind of action" and that "It boggles the mind that any regime on the face of the Earth would want to do anything that could remind people of Nazi Germany". On May 21, Iran summoned Canada's ambassador to Tehran to explain Harper's remarks.

== Apology ==
The National Post issued an apology from editor-in-chief Douglas Kelly on May 24, stating, "It is now clear the story is not true." Amir Taheri was identified as the initial source for the "story of the alleged badge law". The apology attributed "previous statements of the Iranian President" as a factor that contributed to the decision to run the story.

== See also ==
- Yellow badge
