= Faramarzan =

Faramarzan (Persian: فرامرزان) may refer to:

- Faramarzan Rural District
- Faramarzan, alternate name of Jenah
