= Hungu =

Hungu may refer to:

- Henguiyeh, Hormozgan, a village in Iran
- Hungu, a musical bow-type instrument of African origin, a precursor to the Brazilian berimbau
- Hungu (Korean political faction), a political faction of the Joseon Dynasty in the 15th and 16th centuries
