= Gachu =

Gachu may refer to:

- Gachu, Bastak, the village in Bastak County
- Gachu, Sistan and Baluchestan, the village in Sistan and Baluchestan Province
