= Nahend =

Nahend or Nahand (Persian: نهند) may refer to:

- Nahand, East Azerbaijan, Iran
- Nahend, Hormozgan, Iran
