= Darbast, Bastak =

Darbast داربست
- Village
- Location within Iran
- Coordinates: 26°59′34″N 54°03′53″E
- Country: Iran
- Province: Hormozgan
- County: Bastak
- Bakhsh: Jenah
- Rural District: Faramarzan

Population (2006)
  - Total: 450
- Time zone: UTC+3:30 (IRST)
  - Summer (DST): UTC+4:30 (IRDT)

Darbast (Persian: داربست, also Romanized as Dārbast) is a village in Faramarzan Rural District, Jenah District, Bastak County, Hormozgan Province, Iran. At the 2006 census, its population was 450, in 90 families.
