= Kemeshk =

Village in Hormozgan province, Iran

Kemeshk Persian: كمشك
- Village
- Location within Iran
- Coordinates: 27°03′46″N 53°53′31″E
- Country: Iran
- Province: Hormozgan
- County: Bastak
- District: Jenah
- Rural District: Faramarzan

Population (2016)
  - Total: 3,635
- Time zone: UTC+3:30 (IRST)

Kemeshk (Persian: كمشك) (Note: Also romanized as Kameshk and Kamshak; also known as Kemishk and Qamīsk) is a village in, and the capital of, Faramarzan Rural District of Jenah District, Bastak County, Hormozgan province, Iran. The previous capital of the rural district was the village of Jenah, now a city.

== Demographics ==
=== Population ===
At the time of the 2006 National Census, the village's population was 2,977 in 591 households. The following census in 2011 counted 3,744 people in 866 households. The 2016 census measured the population of the village as 3,635 people in 932 households.
