= Khamar-e Qalandaran =

Khamar-e Qalandaran خمرقلندران
- Village
- Location within Iran
- Coordinates: 27°04′30″N 53°58′24″E
- Country: Iran
- Province: Hormozgan
- County: Bastak
- Bakhsh: Jenah
- Rural District: Faramarzan

Population (2006)
  - Total: 118
- Time zone: UTC+3:30 (IRST)
  - Summer (DST): UTC+4:30 (IRDT)

Khamar-e Qalandaran (Persian: خمرقلندران, also Romanized as Khamār-e Qalandarān; also known as Khamār) is a village in Faramarzan Rural District, Jenah District, Bastak County, Hormozgan Province, Iran. At the 2006 census, its population was 118, in 22 families.
