= Chaleh-ye Faramarzan =

Coordinates: 27.0731°N 53.9872°E

Chaleh-ye Faramarzan چاله فرامرزان
- Village
- Interactive map of Chaleh-ye Faramarzan
- Country: Iran
- Province: Hormozgan
- County: Bastak
- Bakhsh: Jenah
- Rural District: Jenah

Population (2006)
  - Total: 283
- Time zone: UTC+3:30 (IRST)
  - Summer (DST): UTC+4:30 (IRDT)

Chaleh-ye Faramarzan (Persian: چاله فرامرزان, also Romanized as Chāleh-ye Farāmarzān) is a village in Jenah Rural District, Jenah District, Bastak County, Hormozgan Province, Iran. At the 2006 census, its population was 283, in 61 families.
