= Ali Mardan, Iran =

Ali Mardan (Persian: عالی‌مردان or علی‌مردان), in Iran, may refer to:

- Ali Mardan, Hormozgan
- Ali Mardan, Sistan and Baluchestan
- Ali Mardan, West Azerbaijan
- Ali Mardan, Zanjan
