= Farhad Moshiri =

British-Iranian businessman (born 1955)

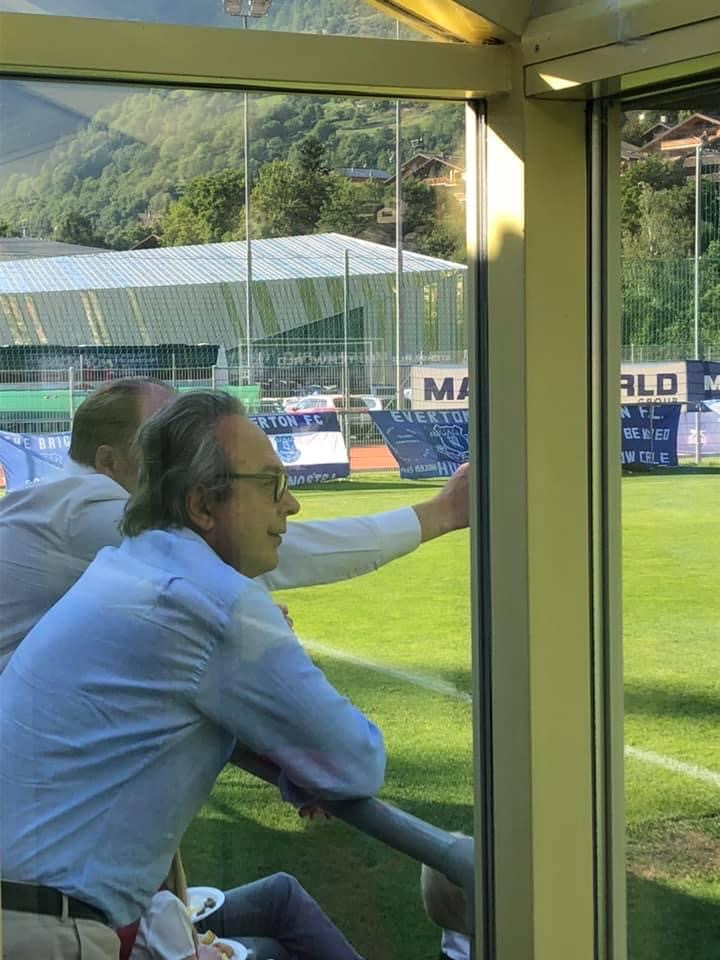
- Moshiri in 2019
- Born: Ardavan Farhad Moshiri; 18 May 1955 (age 71); Iran
- Education: University College London
- Occupation: Businessman
- Spouse: Nazenin Ansari (m. 1988; div. 2015)
- Children: 2

Ardavan Farhad Moshiri (Persian: اردوان فرهاد ﻣﺸﻴﺮى; born 18 May 1955) is a British-Iranian businessman based in Monaco. He is the former majority owner and board member of English Premier League team Everton, and is the former chairman of USM Holdings, a Russian holding company.

== Early life ==
Moshiri was born in the Imperial State of Iran, and his parents left just before the 1979 revolution. His father, Majid, (1926–2020) was an army doctor who trained as a pathologist and later became a senior military judge and his mother's family owned Iran's leading publishing house, Kayhan. He studied economics and statistics at University College London, and subsequently qualified in the UK as a chartered certified accountant.

== Career ==
Moshiri worked for various professional services firms including Ernst & Young (1979–1985), Pannell Kerr Forster (1985–1987) and Deloitte & Touche (1987–1992), latterly as a senior manager in Deloitte's audit division. Between 1993 and 2006, he was executive director of GNE Group plc and later was chief executive officer of Europe Steel Limited (formerly Europe Steel plc) from 2000 to 2008. Between 2006 and 2013, he was the chairman of Metalloinvest, following which he was appointed as chairman of USM Holdings. He resigned as Chairman of USM Holdings on 2 March 2022, following the Russian invasion of Ukraine.

=== Arsenal ===
Moshiri and longstanding business partner Alisher Usmanov were co-owners of Red & White Holdings, which bought 14.65% of the shares in Arsenal from former club vice-chairman David Dein in August 2007. On 18 September 2007, Red and White Holdings increased their stake in Arsenal to 21%, and on 28 September 2007 to 23%, a week after Moshiri announced that he wanted at least a 25% holding in the football club. As of June 2012, Red and White Holdings have acquired at least 29.72%. Arsenal managing director Keith Edelman told BBC Radio 5 Live, "They've said previously they are not going to make a bid for the company and they want to be long-term shareholders."

=== Everton ===
In February 2016, it was announced that Moshiri had sold his stake in Arsenal to Red & White Holdings to partner Usmanov in a bid to raise capital required to launch a takeover at Everton. On 27 February, the club officially confirmed Moshiri's purchase of a 49.9% stake in the club, which was ratified two weeks later by the Premier League. In January 2022, Moshiri increased his shares in the club to 94%. In September 2024, he agreed to sell his shares in Everton to CEO of The Friedkin Group and owner of Italian club Roma, Dan Friedkin, a deal which was completed on December 19, 2024.

== Personal life ==
Moshiri lives in Monaco. His former wife Nazenin Ansari is a London-based Iranian journalist, managing editor of Kayhan London, a weekly Persian-language newspaper, and series producer at Manoto, an international free-to-air Persian language TV channel. They have two children.

According to the Sunday Times Rich List in 2021, Moshiri has an estimated net worth £1.7bn.

Moshiri's daughter Azadeh is a regular newsreader for BBC World News.
