= Rahman Hatfi =

Iranian journalist and essayist (1941 – 1983)

Rahman Hatfi رحمان هاتفی
- Born: 1941
- Died: 10 July 1983 (aged 41–42); Towhid Prison, Tehran
- Cause of death: Suspected suicide
- Other name: Haider Mehrgan
- Occupation: Politically active left-wing journalist
- Known for: The editor of Kayhan newspaper on the eve of the Iranian revolution 1979
- Political party: Tudeh Party of Iran

Rahman Hatfi (Persian: رحمان هاتفی; 1941 – 10 July 1983), also known by the nickname Haider Mehrgan, was a journalist and left-wing political activist from Iran. He served as the editor of the Kayhan newspaper on the eve of the Iranian Revolution in 1979, and later became the editor of Namah Mardom while being a member of the Tudeh Party of Iran. Hatfi was arrested in May 1983 and subsequently died under suspicious circumstances on July 10, 1983. One account suggests he was killed under torture in Towhid Prison, while another story claims he took his own life in his prison cell.

== Before the Revolution ==
After the assassination of Houshang Tezabi by SAVAK, the "Towards the Party" magazine was published for a short period with the efforts of Rahman Hatfi, who had been friends with Dr. Tezabi since his youth and collaborated with him to a large extent. Later, the magazine "Navid" replaced it, and the "Navid Organization" as the internal organization of the Tudeh Party of Iran during that period was formed under the leadership of Rahman Hatfi.

=== Imprisonment ===
He was first arrested in 1966 and spent one year in Qezel Qaleh Prison. He was arrested again in 1971 and released the following year.

=== Journalism ===
In 1973, Hatfi joined the Tudeh Party of Iran and established the Azarakhsh Group (a clandestine group affiliated with this party). Another of his party and journalistic activities was collaborating with Radio Payk Iran (the radio of the Tudeh Party of Iran, which was broadcast from East Germany and later from Bulgaria) and founding the magazine "Navid," which was published in Iran from 1977 and considered one of the party's publications.

In February 1979, most of the headlines of Kayhan newspaper were his work, including the famous headline related to the salute to the military system by a group of Imperial Air Force deserters at Alavi School in front of Ruhollah Khomeini, which, according to the testimony of General Abbas Gharabaghi, the chief of staff at that time, broke the backbone of the imperial government. After publishing this headline, Gharabaghi, demanded that Kayhan either deny it in the next issue or await the newspaper's closure. Hatfi decided to obtain confirmation from Ruhollah Khomeini regarding this incident. In the next issue, Kayhan published this confirmation. This Kayhan headline was, in fact, the initiator of a series of events that led to the uprising of the Air Force deserters and the fall of the regime on February 11, 1979.

== After the Revolution ==
=== Journalism ===
He was dismissed from his journalistic position during purges that took place a few months after the revolution in the spring of 1979 at Kayhan newspaper.

One of his former colleagues, Dr. Sadr-al-Din Elahi, writes about him: "Rahman Hatfi was a journalist who had learned the characteristics of a professional job through experience to the highest degree. He had a very good understanding of the values of news and headlines. He was well acquainted with the intricacies of journalism and its twists and turns, thanks to his shining talent... In page layout and headline and photo selection, his taste was unparalleled." Mr. Asafi, quoting another of his colleagues, writes: "Rahman Hatfi was a noble and kind person. Unique. Jovial every day. I remember he used to pull my beard and say, 'How's the old man?' There isn't a single person today who holds a grudge against him."

His pseudonym and pen name were Haider Mehrgan.

=== Imprisonment and Death ===
Rahman Hatfi was arrested on April 26, 1983, in Tehran and taken to Towhid Prison for interrogation. According to one account, he was killed under torture, and according to another account, he ended his own life in his prison cell by "slitting his veins."

BB Kasraei recounts a memory from his father, Siavash Kasrai: "We were in Afghanistan when they gave my father the news of Rahman Hatfi's death. He cried a lot, and every time we tried to console him, he said: 'Hatfi, was Morteza Keyvan II. These two were from two different generations, but they resembled each other a lot. My liver is burning, these tears soothe me, although it does not heal my burnt liver.'"
