= Ali Ahmadan =

Ali Ahmadan عالی احمدان
- Village
- Location within Iran
- Coordinates: 27°04′23″N 53°59′14″E
- Country: Iran
- Province: Hormozgan
- County: Bastak
- Bakhsh: Jenah
- Rural District: Faramarzan

Population (2006)
  - Total: 584
- Time zone: UTC+3:30 (IRST)
  - Summer (DST): UTC+4:30 (IRDT)

Ali Ahmadan (Persian: عالي احمدان, also Romanized as ‘Ālī Aḩmadān; also known as ‘Ali Ahmadun and ‘Alī Mardān) is a village in Faramarzan Rural District, Jenah District, Bastak County, Hormozgan Province, Iran. At the 2006 census, its population was 584, in 116 families.
