= Greg Bowen =

- Born: Gregory Emmanuel Cole Bowen; May 3, 1943 (age 83); Llangennech, Wales
- Genres: Jazz; swing music; big band; pop music; Production music
- Occupation: Musician
- Years active: 1958–present
- Labels: EMI Records; Columbia Records; Fontana Records; Philips Records; Sony Music; Decca Records; Polydor Records

Gregory Bowen (né Gregory Emmanuel Cole Bowen, May 3, 1943) is a Welsh trumpet player. His primary work was done in London before relocating to Berlin, Germany in 1976. Since 1961, Bowen has performed and recorded with jazz, pop artists and entertainers from Europe and North America on records, soundtracks and T.V. broadcasts. Most notable is his lead trumpet work on the James Bond film soundtracks Goldfinger, Thunderball and You Only Live Twice.

== Early life ==
Bowen was born in the town of Llangennech in South Wales; he is the younger of two brothers. His father Selwyn was a steelworker, his mother Florence a housewife. Bowen started to play the cornet at the age of eight in the Pontarddulais Town Band. The band's director Cliff Ward arranged a few solo trumpet works to feature Greg. While at Strade Secondary School in Llanelli, he joined the Carmarthenshire Youth Orchestra and then later the National Youth Orchestra of Wales. While still at school, Bowen became a part-time student at the Royal Welsh College of Music and Drama in Cardiff where he studied with Ron Trottman of the BBC Welsh Orchestra. In 1959 he became a full-time student at the college and moved to Cardiff. From 1958 onwards, Bowen started playing with bands and orchestras in Wales, most notably with the BBC Welsh Dance Orchestra, directed by Allan Singleton-Wood and featured in the BBC national TV show Swing High and on Welsh radio.

== Career ==
=== Early professional years in London ===
In 1961 Bowen moved to London and played with popular dance orchestras of Johnny Howard, Jack Dorsey, Ray McVay, and Denny Boyce. In 1964 Bowen shifted away from local dance bands to becoming the lead trumpet player in Johnny Dankworth's orchestra, touring throughout Britain and accompanying Mel Tormé. In 1965 he become the lead trumpet chair with Ted Heath's big band. From 1966 onward he played lead trumpet in Tubby Hayes's big band. In 1973 Bowen was part of Kenny Wheeler's big band, playing on the album Song for Someone. From 1970 to 1973 Bowen recorded on a number of tracks with C.C.S. which produced several Top 40 ranked instrumental rock n' roll "covers" in the early 1970s. He also served as first trumpet with the instrumental based Mantovani Concert Orchestra in the mid-1970s which played cover versions of pop music. In 1970 Bowen went on a European tour as co-lead trumpet with Benny Goodman and for Andy Williams' European tour in 1972. He would continue to work with the BBC big bands in London and Wales in later years.

By the mid-1960s, Bowen had become a full-time recording session musician and made the majority of his professional work in London. He often worked seven days a week, frequently doing three recording sessions a day. He played on recordings such as the Beatles' Strawberry Fields Forever, Tom Jones's Delilah (1968), Shirley Bassey's Big Spender (1967), Petula Clark's Don't Sleep in the Subway (1967), as well as early Rolling Stones recordings.

A large part of Bowen's session work during this time was made up of recordings for film and television. In his work on British television, he played in Bob Sharples's Orchestra for the T.V. show Opportunity Knocks (music arranged by Hughie Green). Other TV shows starred Tom Jones (This Is Tom Jones), Lulu, Cilla Black, Morecambe & Wise; musical directors he worked for at this time were Alan Ainsworth, Harry Rabinowitz, Ronnie Hazlehurst, Johnny Harris, and Jack Parnell. Film soundtracks Bowen played on include Ferry Cross the Mersey (1965), The Railway Children (1970), and Jesus Christ Superstar (1973).

==== Playing for James Bond films ====
In 1964, Bowen was first contracted to play trumpet on the recording sessions for Goldfinger, the third installment of the popular James Bond film series. He continued to play lead trumpet on the James Bond films Thunderball (1965), You Only Live Twice (1967), On Her Majesty's Secret Service (1969) and Diamonds Are Forever (1971), with trumpeters Leon Calvert, Ray Davies, Bert Ezzard, and Albert Hall. For Live And Let Die (1973), The Man with the Golden Gun (1974), Tony Fisher took over the lead trumpet chair, with Bowen in the trumpet section alongside Eddie Blair, Leon Calvert, and Stan Roderick (who had played lead trumpet in the first two Bond films: Dr. No and From Russia With Love). In 1975, Bowen went on a five-week tour of Japan with the John Barry Orchestra to promote The Man with the Golden Gun. The trumpet section on this tour consisted of Stan Roderick, Greg Bowen, Tony Fisher, and Eddie Blair. After he moved to West Berlin in 1976, he was contacted by John Barry about A View to a Kill in 1985 for the recording session in London.

=== Professional career in Germany ===
==== Move to Berlin and the RIAS Jazz Orchestra ====
From 1973 on Bowen frequently worked in Cologne playing lead trumpet with Kurt Edelhagen's big band ("Orchester Kurt Edelhagen") which was recording and broadcasting for WDR Radio and T.V. This led to work with the RIAS Tanzorchester under musical directors Werner Müller and Jerry van Rooyen (now the WDR Big Band). In 1974 Bowen met German jazz pianist and bandleader Horst Jankowski who was the current musical director of the West Berlin-based RIAS Dance Orchestra (renamed RIAS Big Band in 1995). Bowen was later hired to take the permanent lead trumpet chair with the RIAS Dance Orchestra in 1976; moving his family to Berlin from the UK. Bowen held the RIAS lead trumpet position for 25 years until the orchestra was officially disbanded in 2001. With the RIAS Big Band he recorded extensively for albums, TV shows and radio programs.

==== Other work in Berlin and central Europe ====
After his relocation to Berlin and apart from his RIAS commitments, in the 80s and 90s played for numerous recording sessions appearing on records for artists such Nana Mouskouri, Manfred Krug, Udo Jürgens and James Last. His credits for Berlin and European produced films range from Die Blechtrommel (The Tin Drum – 1979) to Beyond The Sea (2004). Bowen played regularly with Peter Herbolzheimer's Rhythm Combination & Brass, appearing on albums as well as on the popular TV show Bio's Bahnhof, on which Herbolzheimer's band was a regular feature. More recently he has been performing with the Berlin Big Band and since 2014, he has been playing lead trumpet and recording with the Maria Baptist Jazz Orchestra.

== Honors and awards ==
In 2013, Greg Bowen was made an Honorary Fellow of the Royal Welsh College for Music and Drama, Cardiff, an honor shared for instance with Dame Shirley Bassey, Quincy Jones, and Sir Tom Jones.

== Selected discography ==
- 2016 Here & Now (Maria Baptist Music) Maria Baptist Orchestra
- 2014 Auserwählt (Edel) Manfred Krug & Uschi Brüning
- 2014 Mingus Mingus Mingus Mingus (Jazzwerkstatt)
- 2011 Berlin Cookbook (Mons) Dietrich Koch Big Band
- 2011 Der Ganz Normale Wahnsinn (Ariola) Udo Jürgens
- 2009 Premiere (Mons) Deutsche Oper Big Band Berlin
- 2008 10117 Berlin (NRW) Peter Tenner Jazz-Orchester
- 2007 Mike Taylor Remembered (Trunk) Tribute to Mike Taylor Ensemble
- 2003 Nana Swings (Mercury) Nana Mouskouri
- 2000 Deutsche Schlager, (Warner Bros.) Manfred Krug
- 1999 Blue Highways (Nagel Heyer) RIAS Big Band
- 1998 The Music of the Trumpet Kings, (Nagel Heyer) RIAS Big Band
- 1997 Destiny, (Mons) Mark Nightingale and the RIAS Big Band
- 1994 Big Band Dancing, (Sonoton) RIAS Big Band
- 1989 Jazz-Club · Big Band compilation (Verve) Benny Goodman
- 1987 Latin Groove, (Mons) Peter Herbolzheimer Rhythm Combination & Brass
- 1987 Tribute To Charlie (Koala) Barbara Dennerlein
- 1985 Lightnin, (Jeton) Klaus Weiss Big Band
- 1982 Süss Und Erbarmungslos (Rocktopus) Lilli Berlin
- 1981 Welterfolge (Ariola) Hermann Prey
- 1978 Canyon (Nature) Canyon
- 1978 So Hat Es Die Natur Gewollt (Telefunken) Ulrich Roski
- 1978 Non Stop Dancing 78 – Folge 25 (Polydor) James Last
- 1977 Montreux Summit, Vol. 1 and 2 (Columbia), various artists
- 1977 Song For Someone (Incus) Kenny Wheeler
- 1977 Disco 1978 (Philips) Orchestra Kai Warner
- 1976 Yes Sir, That's My Baby, (EMI) Horst Jankowski and the RIAS Tanzorchester
- 1975 Plant Life, (Philips) Herbie Flowers
- 1974 Bert Kaempfert in London (Polydor) Bert Kaempfert
- 1973 The Best Band in the Land, (Rak) CCS
- 1973 Still, (Manticore) Pete Sinfield
- 1972 Bootleg Him!, (Warner Bros.) Alexis Korner
- 1972 Mr. Trumpet, (Longines Symphonette Society) Harry James and his Orchestra
- 1972 The Bill McGuffie Big Band, (Rediffusion) Bill McGuffie Big Band
- 1971 Platinum (CBS) Salena Jones
- 1971 What The World Needs Now!, (Pye Records) Tony Hatch and his Orchestra
- 1971 Benny Goodman in Concert (Recorded Live in Stockholm), (Decca) Benny Goodman And His Orchestra
- 1971 Spindrift, (EMI) Harry Roche Constellation
- 1970 Benny Goodman Today (London) Benny Goodman
- 1970 Bill McGuffie An Alto And Some Brass, (Rediffusion) Bill McGuffie
- 1970 CCS, (RAK) CCS
- 1970 Ascension Heights, (Blue Horizon) Top Topham
- 1970 The Seven Ages of Man, (Columbia) Stan Tracey
- 1970 When The Saints Go, (Aristocrat) David Lindup
- 1970 The Orchestra (Fontana), Tubby Hayes
- 1970 Marching Song: An Anti-War Jazz Symphony, (Deram) Mike Westbrook Concert Band
- 1969 Rumpus, (Savage Solweig) Tubby Hayes Big Band
- 1968 Definitely What!, (Brunswick) Brian Auger and the Trinity
- 1968 Fall Out (Philips) Terry Smith
- 1968 Beautiful in the Rain (Marble Arch Records) The Tony Hatch Sound
- 1968 Why Not! (Philips) Johnnie Spence Big Band
- 1967 This Is My Scene (Decca) The Alan Tew Orchestra
- 1967 The Two Faces of Fame (CBS) Georgie Fame
- 1967 Beatle Music (World Record Club) The Session Men
- 1967 This Is My Scene, (Decca) Alan Tew Orchestra
- 1967 The Third Face of Fame, (Columbia) Georgie Fame
- 1967 Seekers Seen in Green, (Columbia) The Seekers
- 1967 Magical Mystery Tour/Strawberry Fields Forever (Capitol, Parlophone), Beatles
- 1967 100% Proof (Fontana), Tubby Hayes
- 1967 Dawn (Columbia), Nina & Frederik
- 1967 Emotions (Fontana), Pretty Things
- 1966/1975 -four singles recorded/two released- (Polydor), Bluesology
- 1966 Sound Venture (Columbia) Georgie Fame and the Harry South Big Band
- 1966 Songs for a Rainy Day (Columbia), Roy Castle
- 1966 London Swings (Stereo 2/EMI), Johnny Scott Orchestra
- 1966 Drum Spectacular (Stereo 2/EMI), Kenny Clare, Ronnie Stephenson
- 1965 Zodiac Variations (Fontana), John Dankworth

== Selected live broadcasts, T.V., Youtube, etc. ==
- 1964 Harry South Big Band – (May 6, 1964, BBC Radio, Jazz Club Broadcast with Humphrey Lyttelton)
- 1965 Tubby Hayes And The Commonwealth Big Band – (November 7, 1965, BBC Radio, Jazz Club Broadcast with Humphrey Lyttelton)
- 1966 Jazz Goes to College: the Tubby Hayes Big Band – (Recorded on May 11, 1966, at Queen Mary's College, London, made for T.V. series, Broadcast with Humphrey Lyttelton)
- 1969 Jazz Scene at the Ronnie Scott Club – Tubby Hayes Big Band – August 24, 1969 (BBC broadcast live at Ronnie Scott's Club)
- 1972 C.C.S. – August 5, 1972 (BBC 2 Sounds for Saturday)

== Selected filmography/soundtracks ==
- 2004 Beyond The Sea
- 1981 Nighthawks
- 1980 Inferno
- 1979 Die Blechtrommel (The Tin Drum)
- 1974 The Man with the Golden Gun
- 1973 Jesus Christ Superstar
- 1973 Live and Let Die
- 1971 Diamonds Are Forever
- 1970 The Railway Children
- 1969 On Her Majesty's Secret Service
- 1967 You Only Live Twice
- 1965 Thunderball
- 1965 Ferry Cross the Mersey
- 1964 Goldfinger

== See also ==
- List of trumpet artists (Germany)
- RIAS Big Band (Berlin)
