= Kahtuiyeh, Hormozgan =

Village in Hormozgan province, Iran

Kahtuiyeh Persian: كهتويه
- Village
- Location within Iran
- Coordinates: 26°59′43″N 54°12′48″E
- Country: Iran
- Province: Hormozgan
- County: Bastak
- District: Jenah
- Rural District: Jenah

Population (2016)
  - Total: 1,584
- Time zone: UTC+3:30 (IRST)

Kahtuiyeh (Persian: كهتويه) (Note: Also romanized as Kahtūīyeh and Kahtūyeh; also known as Gāh Tūyeh and Kahtu) is a village in Jenah Rural District of Jenah District, Bastak County, Hormozgan province, Iran.

== Demographics ==
=== Population ===
At the time of the 2006 National Census, the village's population was 1,158 in 265 households. The following census in 2011 counted 1,618 people in 369 households. The 2016 census measured the population of the village as 1,584 people in 440 households. It was the most populous village in its rural district.
