= Mistan, Iran =

Mistan (Persian: ميستان), in Iran, may refer to:

- Mistan, Hormozgan
- Mistan, Mazandaran
