= Ali Mardan =

Ali Mardan may refer to:

- Ali Mardan, Iran (disambiguation), several places
- Ali Mardan Khalji (13th century), ruler of Bengal in eastern India
- Ali Mardan Khan (died 1657), Kurdish military leader in Mughal India
  - Tomb of Ali Mardan Khan, his tomb in Lahore
- Ali Mardan Khan Bakhtiari (r. 1750–1751), Bakhtiari chief of Iran
- Mir 'Ali Mardan Khan, Nuzrat ol-Molk (1840–1903), Persian noble
- Ali Merdan (1904–1981), Kurdish musician
