= Mistan, Hormozgan =

Coordinates: 27.1480°N 54.8344°E

Mistan ميستان
- Village
- Interactive map of Mistan
- Country: Iran
- Province: Hormozgan
- County: Bastak
- Bakhsh: Jenah
- Rural District: Jenah

Population (2006)
  - Total: 156
- Time zone: UTC+3:30 (IRST)
  - Summer (DST): UTC+4:30 (IRDT)

Mistan (Persian: ميستان, also Romanized as Mīstān) is a village in Jenah Rural District, Jenah District, Bastak County, Hormozgan Province, Iran. At the 2006 census, its population was 156, in 30 families.
