= Nazenin Ansari =

Iranian journalist and editor

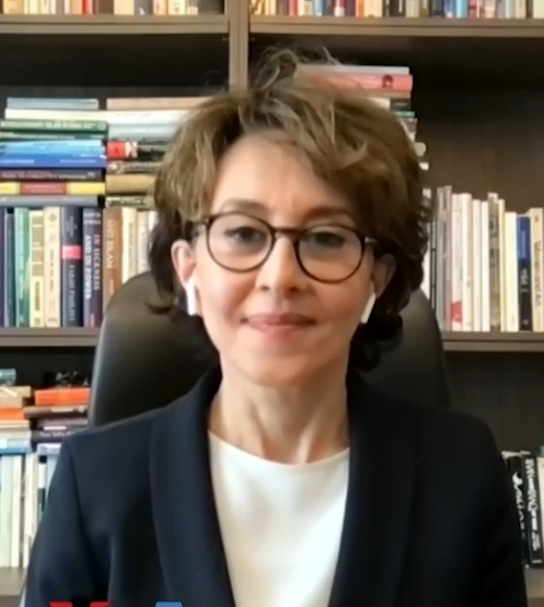
- Education: B.A. George Washington University; M.A. Georgetown University.
- Occupation: Journalist
- Spouse: Farhad Moshiri (m. 1988; div. 2015)
- Children: 2

Nazenin Ansari (Persian: نازنین انصاری) is an Iranian journalist, managing editor of Kayhan London (Persian: کیهان لندن), a weekly Persian-language digital newspaper based in London, covering Iran's politics, economy, society, environment and culture, and their impact on the international scene. Critical of the Islamic government of Iran, Kayhan London is not to be confused with the Tehran based official Iranian newspaper Kayhan. She also heads Kayhan London's sister English-language media outlet Kayhan Life and produced a series for the Persian-language entertainment channel Manoto.

Ansari was a London correspondent for Voice of America's Persian News Network until July 2009. She served as President (2007–2009) and Vice-President (2009–2012) of The Foreign Press Association London.

== Early life ==
Ansari received her higher education in the US, with a BA in Public Affairs and Government from George Washington University and an MA in International Relations and Comparative Politics from Georgetown University.

She is a regular panelist on BBC News's Dateline London programme, and provides news analysis about Iran on BBC Radio 4, CNN International, Sky News and Al-Jazeera. She also contributes on the OpenDemocracy website.

Ansari has worked with and been a member of a number of Iranian educational and charitable foundations, including Friends of Persian, the Friends of Persian Language Society, Benefactors of Kahrizak, the Iran Heritage Foundation, the Popli Khalatbari Foundation, the Mihan Foundation, the Persia Educational Foundation and Magic of Persia. She is a member of Chatham House and the International Institute for Strategic Studies, and sits on the Board of Trustees of Encyclopædia Iranica.

== Personal life ==
Ansari was married to the British-Iranian billionaire Farhad Moshiri, and they have two children. She lives in London, while Moshiri lives in Monaco.

The ex-couple’s daughter Azadeh is a regular newsreader for BBC World News.
