= Sulamith Wülfing =

German artist and illustrator

- Born: Sulamith Wülfing; January 11, 1901; Elberfeld, Rhine Province (now Wuppertal, Germany)
- Died: 1989 (aged 87–88)
- Known for: Symbolic, mystical art, illustrations inspired by visions of angels, fairies, gnomes, and nature spirits
- Style: Symbolism, fantasy art
- Spouse: Otto Schulze
- Children: 1
- Parent(s): Karl Wülfing, Hedwig Wülfing

Sulamith Wülfing (January 11, 1901 – 1989) was a German artist and illustrator. The author Michael Folz explains that Wülfing's art was a "realistic reflection of the world she lives in: she has seen the angels and elfin creatures of her paintings throughout her life."

== Life ==
Born in Elberfeld, Rhine Province on January 11, 1901 to Theosophist parents Karl and Hedwig Wülfing. She had a sister, Hedwig, who was born in 1905 and died in 1968. For the first five years of her life she and her parents lived in complete seclusion. As a child, Sulamith had visions of angels, fairies, gnomes, and nature spirits. She first began drawing these creatures at the age of four. The visions continued throughout her life, and directly inspired her paintings.

Sulamith Wülfing graduated from the Art College in Wuppertal in 1921, and in 1932 married Otto Schulze, a professor at the Art College. Together, they created the Sulamith Wülfing Verlag (publishing house). During World War II, the industrial area around Wuppertal became a bombing target, and Wülfing's house was destroyed, along with many of her paintings.

Her family became separated during the war, when she received a false report of her husband's death on the Russian front and fled to France with her only child; they were later reunited on Christmas 1945. Under the Nazi regime her books were often burned and she was told repeatedly to paint by the rules at the time, which were large heroic scenes with the leader of States.

Wülfing considered the Hindu mystic Master Jiddu Krishnamurti her spiritual mentor and guide, and believed his influence helped her through difficult times. Wülfing died in 1989 at the age of 88.

== Art ==
The mood of Wülfing's work ranges from serene to wistful to deeply melancholic. The subject is often mysterious, with narrative elements at whose meaning the observer can only guess—exactly as the artist intended. In her own words: "To people attuned to my compositions, they may well be mirrors of their own experiences. It is because of this that I have left the explanation of the drawings completely to the viewer, so that they are not bound by my interpretation of what each picture should be."

Characteristic Wülfing paintings feature slender, fair-haired, fey young women and men, with large eyes and sad or thoughtful faces, wearing elaborately patterned gowns or robes, and sometimes veils, snoods, wreaths, or jeweled crowns. These maidens are placed in outdoor settings of twilight woods and moonlit meadows, or in castle-like interiors with vaguely Gothic detail (stone arches, stained glass windows, carved throne-like chairs). Some of the patterns on the clothing and furniture resemble Norse and Celtic knotwork.

Brambles and thorns, moths and butterflies, feathers, leaves, and delicately rendered flowers add organic richness, texture and complexity to the images. Many of the paintings have a "fairytale" feel, with grinning dwarves and gnomes, knights in armor, dragons, and the like. Some have a holiday focus, usually Christmas or Easter. Several appear to depict the Annunciation. A black and white series portrays the Stations of the Cross. In the more spiritually-themed images, radiant winged beings appear to give comfort or counsel to troubled humans. Several of the paintings touch upon the theme of pregnancy and motherhood, while others echo the experience of loneliness and separation, and still others are indicative of love and fulfillment.

Wulfing said this about her work: "My drawings are a visual representation of my deepest feelings—pleasure, fear, sorrow, happiness, humor. For me it is not a matter of creating illustrations to fit nursery rhyme themes. My ideas come to me from many sources, and in such harmony with my personal experiences that I can turn them into these fairy compositions. My Angels are my consolers, leaders, companions, guards. And dwarfs often show me the small ironies and other things to make me smile even in life's most awesome events."

While she was best known for her work in painting and illustration, she also did some work in collages and tapestry.

== Publications ==
A few of Wülfing's books were published through Bluestar Communications. This publishing company was part of the New Age movement, which was a push for "therapeutic spirituality" in the 1970s.

During the artist's lifetime, over 200 of her works were published in the form of postcards by the Sulamith Wülfing Verlag. A large-format book with forty color plates, The Fantastic Art of Sulamith Wulfing was edited by David Larkin. Published in 1977, the book is now out of print. During the 1980s, a series of limited edition commemorative plates featuring Wülfing's art were issued. Wülfing also created a series of illustrations for Hans Christian Andersen's story The Little Mermaid.

Early examples of collections of her illustrations include Der Mond ist aufgegangen (The moon has come up) (1933); Christian Morgenstern (1934); Die Truhe (The Chest) (1935); Der Leuchter (The Shining) (1936); Die Schwelle (The Threshold) (1937); and Die kleine Seejungfrau (The Little Mermaid) (1953).

The Larkin book, plates, and postcards are now collector's items, as are the original publications. However, some items featuring her artwork are still in print: boxed notecard sets, oracle decks, journals, a yearly calendar called Angel Spirits, and a few illustrated books including Nature Spirits and The Little Mermaid.

The books Angel Oracle and Maidens & Love by Sulamith Wulfing were published by Bluestar Communications.

== Influence on other artists ==
Wülfing's work, named Der Kristall (The Crystal), inspired the artwork for the LP Every Good Boy Deserves Favour (1971) by the British band The Moody Blues.

Singer-songwriter Stevie Nicks has credited Wülfing's art with providing the inspiration for many of her songs, as well as the cover of her 1983 album The Wild Heart. During Nicks's 2005 Gold Dust Tour, some of Wülfing's work was displayed on the concert video screen.

In 1973 Pete Sinfield, former lyricist of progressive rock band King Crimson, used the painting Big Friend on the front cover of his first solo album Still. The illustration reflects his interest in the balance between fragility and power, clarity and illusion.

In 1980, Japanese rock band Novela used one of pictures from her Mermaid for their first LP's cover art.

Artist & dollmaker Marina Bychkova credits Sulamith Wülfing as her source of inspiration. Another artist whose work has been compared to Wulfing's is Feeroozeh Golmohammadi.
