= Gachuyeh =

Gachuyeh گچوئيه
- Village
- Location within Iran
- Coordinates: 27°00′49″N 53°59′39″E
- Country: Iran
- Province: Hormozgan
- County: Bastak
- Bakhsh: Jenah
- Rural District: Faramarzan

Population (2006)
  - Total: 891
- Time zone: UTC+3:30 (IRST)
  - Summer (DST): UTC+4:30 (IRDT)

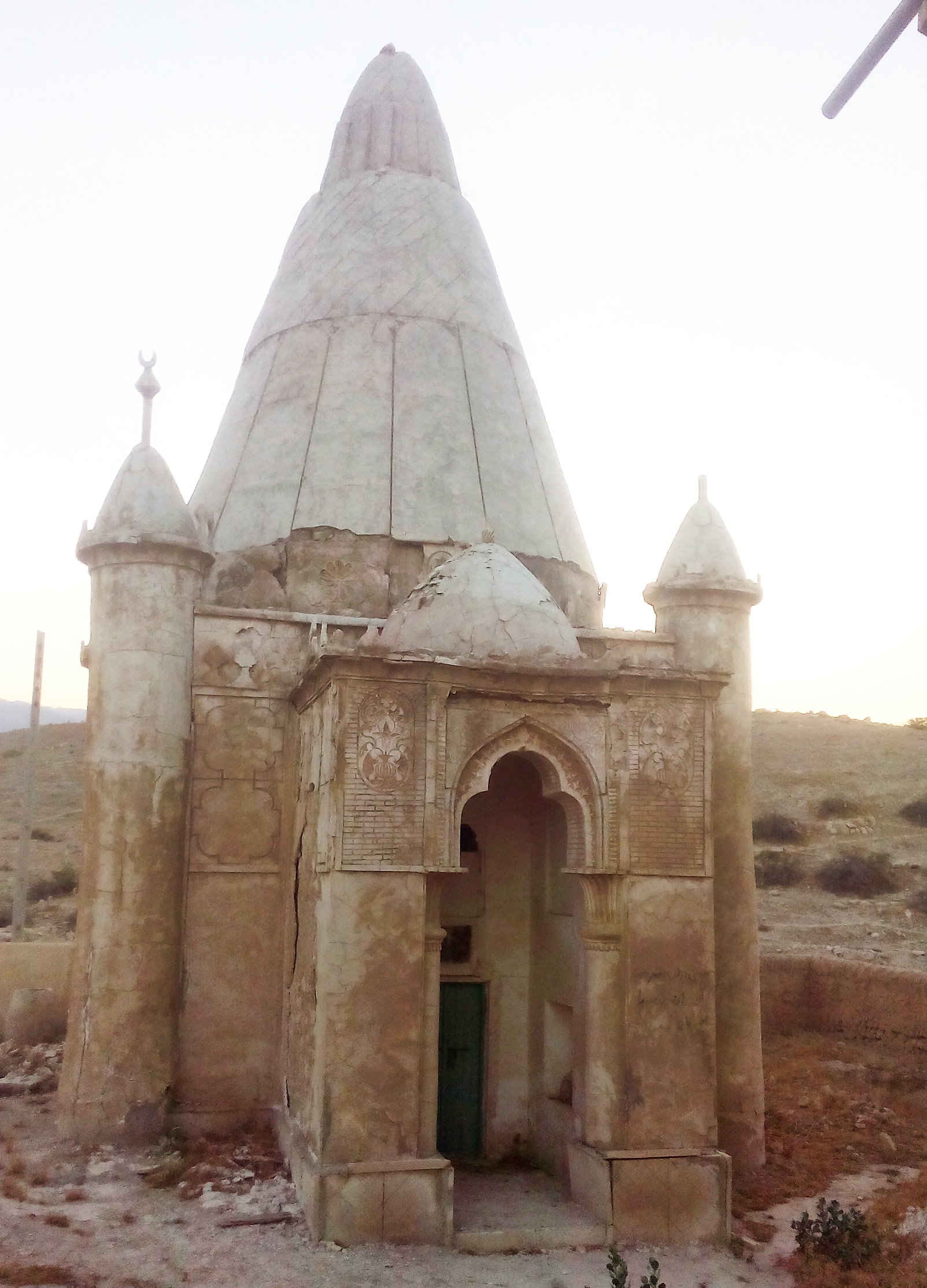
Tomb of Sheikh Abdul Qader Bastaki in Gachoyeh Village of Bastak City, Iran

Gachuyeh (Persian: گچوئيه, also Romanized as Gachūyeh and Gachooyeh; also known as Gachu, Cachūyeh, and Kachūyeh) is a village in Faramarzan Rural District, Jenah District, Bastak County, Hormozgan Province, Iran. At the 2006 census, its population was 891, in 174 families.
