= Benny Goodman Today =

Compilation album by Benny Goodman
- Released: 1970
- Genre: Jazz
- Label: London

Benny Goodman Today is a jazz compilation album by Benny Goodman. It was released in 1970 and features big band and small group selections recorded during a concert in Stockholm, Sweden. It was released in the United States on the London Records label (London SPB 21, 2-LP set) as a "phase 4 stereo spectacular".

The album, as issued, has a few shortcomings, among them a failure to list the band personnel, despite a double gatefold album with an included booklet full of band photos. And some of the band arrangements are new, and rather uncharacteristic of Goodman's classic style.

== Personnel ==
(Source Roy Willox)

- Bass: Lennie Bush
- Drums: Bobby Orr
- Guitar: Louis Stewart Bucky Pizzarelli
- Piano: Bill McGuffie
- Saxophone: Bob Burns, Don Honeywell, Bob Efford, Frank Reidy, Dave Willis
- Trombone: Nat Peck, Keith Christie, Jim Wilson
- Trumpet: Derek Watkins, Greg Bowen, John Maclevy
