= Feeroozeh Golmohammadi =

Iranian artist

Feeroozeh Golmohammadi (Persian: فیروزه گل‌محمدی; born June 21, 1951) is an Iranian artist, miniaturist, writer, and illustrator. For three years, she worked as the chief editor of Zan-e-Rooz (lit. 'Today's Woman'), an Iranian woman's magazine.

== Biography ==
Feeroozeh was born on June 21, 1951, in Tehran. She began her art education in a high school and obtained a diploma in this field and continued her studies at an art university in Iran. Her artistic works have been exhibited in the Middle East, Far East, India, Europe and in the United States.

== Style ==
Feeroozeh is primarily a miniaturist. Her major technique is hand printing with ink and mixed media. She also paints on unconventional papers using the medium of acrylic with additions of calligraphy. Her works have been compared to the German artist Sulamith Wülfing.

== Themes ==
The mystical Sufi-influenced images occupy an important place in most of her works.

== Major works ==
=== Paintings ===
- Ascension
- Woman, Water, Mirror

=== Books illustrated ===
- What Shape is an Elephant by Rumi (Katha, January, 2006)
- A Prayer for World Peace by Jane Goodall (first published October 1, 2015)
- The Jackal who fell into the Paint Vat by Rumi (2016)
