= Still (Pete Sinfield album) =

Studio album by Pete Sinfield
- Released: 1973
- Recorded: October 1972 – January 1973
- Studios: Command Studios, London
- Genres: Progressive rock, art rock
- Length: 42:50
- Label: Manticore
- Producer: Pete Sinfield

Pete Sinfield chronology
Islands (with King Crimson) (1971)	Still (1973)	–

Professional ratings
Review scores
Source	Rating
AllMusic	4/5 stars
Classic Rock	7/10 stars

Still (also known as Stillusion) is the only solo album by Pete Sinfield, former lyricist of progressive rock band King Crimson, released in 1973. At the time, Sinfield was involved with Emerson, Lake & Palmer, and Greg Lake assisted with vocals, while other King Crimson alumni provided assistance. The cover artwork depicts "The Big Friend" by German artist Sulamith Wülfing.

== Track listing ==
All lyrics are written by Pete Sinfield.

Side one
No.	Title	Music	Length
1.	"The Song of the Sea Goat" (based on themes from Vivaldi's Lute Concerto in D Major)	Antonio Vivaldi, Pete Sinfield, Phil Jump	6:07
2.	"Under the Sky" (Giles, Giles & Fripp cover)	Ian McDonald	4:21
3.	"Will It Be You"	Alan Mennie, Sinfield, Jump, Richard Brunton, Steve Dolan	2:42
4.	"Wholefood Boogie"	Mennie, Sinfield, Jump, Brunton, Dolan	3:38
5.	"Still"	Mennie, Sinfield, Jump, Brunton, Dolan	4:48

Side two
No.	Title	Music	Length
6.	"Envelopes of Yesterday"	Sinfield	6:20
7.	"The Piper"	Sinfield	2:51
8.	"A House of Hopes and Dreams"	Sinfield	4:09
9.	"The Night People"	Mel Collins, Sinfield, Jump, Brunton	7:54

1993 CD re-issue includes alternates mixes of the songs, as well as two extra tracks: "Hanging Fire" and "Can You Forgive a Fool?"

Recorded at Command Studios, London, on January–February 1973
No.	Title	Length
1.	"Hanging Fire"
2.	"Still" (First Mix)
3.	"The Song of the Sea Goat"
4.	"Under the Sky"
5.	"Wholefood Boogie"
6.	"Envelopes of Yesterday"
7.	"The Piper"
8.	"A House of Hopes and Dreams"
9.	"The Night People"
10.	"Still" (Second Mix)
11.	"Can You Forgive a Fool?" (Recorded at Advision Studios, London, April 1975)

== Personnel ==
- Peter Sinfield - vocals, twelve-string guitar, synthesizer, production, cover design
- Greg Lake - backing vocals (4), lead vocals (5), electric guitar (8), associate producer, mixing
- W.G. Snuffy Walden - electric guitar
- Keith Christmas - guitar
- Richard Brunton - guitar
- B.J. Cole - steel guitar
- Boz Burrell - bass guitar (9)
- John Wetton - bass guitar (1), fuzz bass (6)
- Steve Dolan - bass guitar
- Keith Tippett - piano on "The Song of the Sea Goat"
- Tim Hinkley - electric piano (9)
- Brian Flowers - synthesizer
- Phil Jump - glockenspiel, keyboards, Hammond organ, electric piano, piano, Woolworth's organ (2), freeman symhoniser
- Mel Collins - alto flute, bass flute (1), alto saxophone, tenor saxophone, baritone saxophone, celeste, arranger, associate producer, mixing
- Don Honeywell - baritone saxophone on "The Night People"
- Robin Miller - English horn
- Greg Bowen - trumpet
- Stan Roderick - trumpet
- Chris Pyne - trombone
- Ian Wallace - drums (9), snare drum (1)
- Alan "Min" Mennie - drums, percussion

Technical

- Mel Collins - associate producer, mixing assistant
- Greg Lake - associate producer for vocals, mixing
- Andy Hendriksen, Phil Lever, Ray Hendriksen, Peter Gallen - engineer
