= Darbast, Bashagard =

Darbast داربست
- Village
- Location within Iran
- Coordinates: 26°18′34″N 57°31′07″E
- Country: Iran
- Province: Hormozgan
- County: Bashagard
- Bakhsh: Central
- Rural District: Jakdan

Population (2006)
  - Total: 215
- Time zone: UTC+3:30 (IRST)
  - Summer (DST): UTC+4:30 (IRDT)

Darbast (Persian: داربست, also Romanized as Dārbast) is a village in Jakdan Rural District, in the Central District of Bashagard County, Hormozgan Province, Iran. At the 2006 census, its population was 215, in 41 families.
