= Ali Mardan, West Azerbaijan =

Ali Mardan علی‌مردان
- Village
- Location within Iran
- Coordinates: 39°02′51″N 44°39′56″E
- Country: Iran
- Province: West Azerbaijan
- County: Chaldoran
- Bakhsh: Central
- Rural District: Baba Jik

Population (2006)
  - Total: 80
- Time zone: UTC+3:30 (IRST)
  - Summer (DST): UTC+4:30 (IRDT)

Ali Mardan (Persian: علی‌مردان, also Romanized as ‘Alī Mardān) is a village in Baba Jik Rural District, in the Central District of Chaldoran County, West Azerbaijan Province, Iran. At the 2006 census, its population was 80, in 15 families.
