= Chaleh, Faryab =

Chaleh چاله
- Village
- Location within Iran
- Coordinates: 28°26′57″N 57°02′12″E
- Country: Iran
- Province: Kerman
- County: Faryab
- Bakhsh: Central
- Rural District: Hur

Population (2006)
  - Total: 55
- Time zone: UTC+3:30 (IRST)
  - Summer (DST): UTC+4:30 (IRDT)

Chaleh (Persian: چاله, also Romanized as Chāleh) is a village in Hur Rural District, in the Central District of Faryab County, Kerman Province, Iran. At the 2006 census, its population was 55, in 15 families.
