= Zan-e Rooz =

Iranian women's magazine

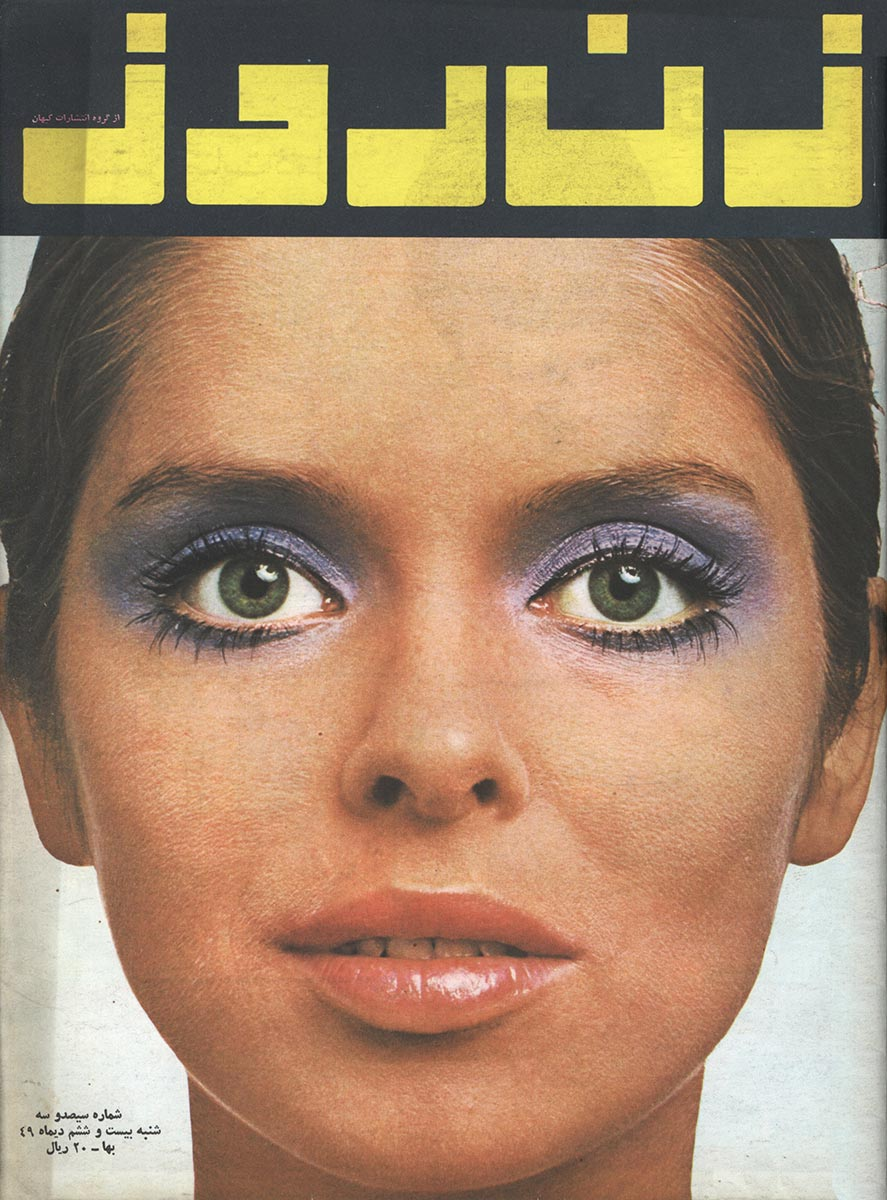
- Zan-e Rooz cover, Issue 303, 16 January 1971
- Categories: Women's magazine
- Frequency: Weekly
- Founder: Majid Davami
- First issue: 27 February 1965
- Company: Kayhan
- Country: Iran
- Based in: Tehran
- Language: Persian
- ISSN: 1029-6913

Zan-e Rooz or Zan-e Rouz or Zan-e Ruz (Persian: زن روز, romanized: Woman of Today) is an Iranian weekly women's magazine published in Tehran, Iran since 1965. From its founding until the 1990s Zan-e Rooz was the most popular magazine in Iran.

== History ==
The first issue of Zan-e Rooz hit the newsstands of Tehran on 27 February 1965 and was an immediate success. Published by the Kayhan Institute, the magazine had an initial print run of 15,000 copies. By 1968 its circulation had reached 140,000 copies, making it one of Iran's highest-circulating periodicals. Its principal rival was Ettelaat-e Banuvan, although Zan-e Rooz soon surpassed it in popularity. The magazine was founded by Majid Davami, who conceived the idea for ‘‘Zan-e Rooz’’ following a journalism study trip to the United States. After returning to Iran, he proposed the project to Mostafa Mesbahzadeh, who approved its launch through the Kayhan Institute. Davami developed the magazine’s editorial concept and served as its editor-in-chief until 1979.

During the late Pahlavi period, Zan-e Rooz combined fashion, beauty, celebrity interviews and entertainment with articles on education, employment, family life and women's changing social roles. Scholars have described it as one of the most influential women’s magazines of the late Pahlavi era, reflecting and shaping debates about modern Iranian womanhood while reaching a mass readership of young urban women.

Under Davami’s editorial direction, ‘‘Zan-e Rooz’’ became one of Iran’s most influential women’s magazines. Its coverage combined fashion, beauty, celebrity interviews and entertainment with articles on education, employment, family life and women’s changing social roles. The magazine’s distinctive editorial identity also included the creation and promotion of the annual ‘‘Dokhtar-e Shayesteh’’ competition.

After the 1979 Islamic Revolution the editorial board was overhauled and Zan-E Rooz became an Islamic lifestyle magazine. The magazine moved away from the Western-style gossip sheet and women's publication that it was previously and now explored the rights of women within an Islamic framework.

Shahla Sherkat was appointed editor in 1991, she was quickly accused of "promoting modernist, westernised and feminist tendencies," and fired the same year. Sherkat then founded Zanan which became the most popular feminist magazine in Iran before publication was suspended in 2008 by order of the Mahmoud Ahmadinejad government.

== Editors ==
- Majid Davami (1965–1979)
- Shahla Ansari (1980 – c. 1988)
- Feeroozeh Golmohammadi (c. 1988–1991)
- Shahla Sherkat (1991)

== Dokhtar-e Shayesteh ==
One of ‘‘Zan-e Rooz’’‘s best-known initiatives was its annual ‘‘Dokhtar-e Shayesteh’’ (“Teen Princess”) competition, conceived and organized by the magazine under the direction of Majid Davami. According to Liora Hendelman-Baavur, the competition became a major platform through which the magazine promoted its ideal of the modern Iranian woman by combining beauty, education and public participation among young women. Through the competition, ‘‘Zan-e Rooz’’ also initiated Iran’s participation in international beauty pageants, with members of the magazine’s editorial staff accompanying and assisting Iranian contestants at international competitions.

Prior to the 1979 Islamic Revolution cover models included Empress Farah Pahlavi, Behrouz Vossoughi, Giti Pashaei, Googoosh, Jean Shrimpton, and Twiggy, among others. During the revolution images of protests and veiled revolutionaries were featured on the cover.

== Contributors ==
Writers with this publication include Poopak NikTalab, Nooshafarin Ansari and Aminollah Rezaei.
