= Eliana Benador =

Swiss-American public relations consultant

- Education: Université Catholique de Lille, University of Vienna, Faculté des lettres de Sorbonne Université
- Employer: Benador Associates (2001–2006)
- Organization: National Council of European Resistance

Eliana Benador (also Eleana Benador) is a Swiss-American public relations consultant, global strategist, and a publicist for American and Middle Eastern neo-conservatives. Through the development of Benador Associates, Benador promoted national security policies advocated by the Bush administration concerning Iraqi regime change, the Iraq War, and hard-line attitudes toward Iran. As of 2007, Benador had closed Benador Associates and opened a new firm, Benador Public Relations.

== Career ==
Benador studied linguistics, psychology and political science at the Sorbonne and the Université Catholique de Lille. Following university, she worked as an editor for the Peruvian Times and as a translator at the United Nations in Vienna. In 2000, Benador joined the Middle East Forum, an American conservative think tank, to work as the associate director of, and in charge of the expansion of, the Middle East Forum in New York, and she also was the media liaison of its founder Daniel Pipes. Benador left the MEF after eighteen months because of conflicts with Pipes. According to Pipes, they came to a mutual and amicable "understanding that she would do better on her own."

In October 2001, Benador began her own public relations firm, Benador & Associates. After signing former CIA director James Woolsey and Daily News columnist A.M. Rosenthal, Benador's firm built a clientele of American neo-conservatives. Benador was criticized for "acting as a kind of public-relations firm for the war."

In January 2011, Benador was appointed Goodwill Ambassador of the Shomron (Samaria) Liaison Office in the U.S. and Europe. In that capacity, she addressed the Rally in Support of Israel across the Israel Consulate in New York City, offering proportional comparison by population of the United States to the numbers of Israeli victims of terrorist attacks; according to Benador the 1,200 Israelis victimized from 2000 to 2010 would correspond to 50,297 Americans, while the 8,342 wounded would compare to 350,000.

== Selected articles ==
- Surveillance law takes its toll in Sweden, The Gulf News, July 25, 2008
- Can Palin make a difference?, The Gulf News, September 1, 2008
- For America, it is the time for change, The Gulf News, October 3, 2008
