= Hossein Shariatmadari =

Iranian journalist

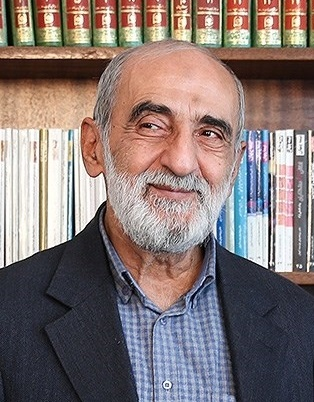
- Born: 1948 (age 77–78); Damavand, Tehran Province, Iran
- Occupation: Journalist
- Political party: Association of Muslim Journalists
- Military career
- Branch: Revolutionary Guards

Hossein Shariatmadari (Persian: حسین شريعتمداری) is the managing editor of Kayhan, a conservative (principlist) and hard-line Iranian newspaper.

== Career ==
A strong supporter of president Mahmoud Ahmadinejad, he has been described as being "a close confidant of Iran's supreme leader" Ali Khamenei, and as having "links" to Iran's intelligence services.

On 17 April 2012 Shariatmadari published an editorial in which he stressed Iran's right to enrich uranium to 99%.

== Controversies ==
After the controversial 2009 election and weeks of protest, Shariatmadari wrote an editorial in Kayhan alleging that defeated candidate Mir Hossein Mousavi was trying to "escape punishment for murdering innocent people, holding riots, cooperating with foreigners and acting as America's fifth column inside the country" and called for Mousavi and former reformist President Mohammad Khatami to be tried in court for "horrible crimes and treason."

In 2020, Shariatmadari said that the Holocaust "was falsely claimed by Zionist and Western governments" and that the real Holocaust was of Christians in Najran by Yemenite Jews in 524 CE. The article, shared by the semi-official Fars News Agency, was condemned as an antisemitic promotion of Holocaust denial.

In April 2026, Shariatmadari opposed the 2026 Iran war ceasefire, saying that the US cannot be trusted, and argued that any ceasefire would be used by the US to prepare for the next round of attacks.

In September 2026, he suggested that Iran should damage or sever the undersea cables passing through the Strait of Hormuz that provide internet connection to Arabia.
