= Darbas, Iran =

Darbas داربس
- Village
- Location within Iran
- Coordinates: 28°23′50″N 53°38′28″E
- Country: Iran
- Province: Fars
- County: Jahrom
- Bakhsh: Central
- Rural District: Jolgah

Population (2006)
  - Total: 28
- Time zone: UTC+3:30 (IRST)
  - Summer (DST): UTC+4:30 (IRDT)

Darbas (Persian: داربس, also Romanized as Dārbas; also known as Dārbast) is a village in Jolgah Rural District, in the Central District of Jahrom County, Fars province, Iran. At the 2006 census, its population was 28, in 5 families.
