= Meir Javedanfar =

Israeli journalist of Iranian descent

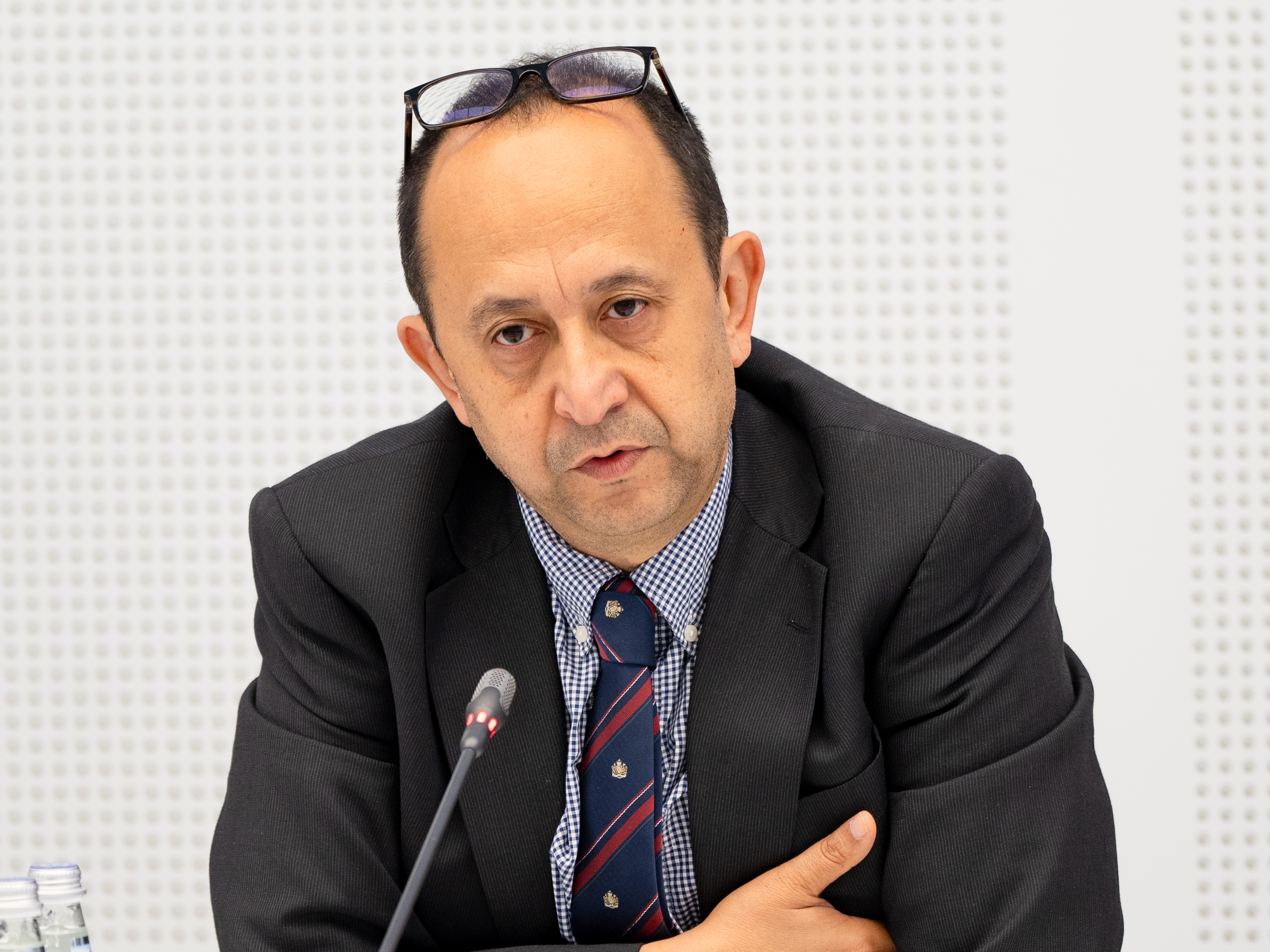
Image of Meir

Meir Javedanfar (Hebrew: מאיר ג'אבדנפר) is an Iranian-born Israeli Middle East commentator and academic. He left Iran in 1987 and now lives in Israel. He has worked as a foreign affairs commentator at BBC Persian. With Yossi Melman, he co-authored The Nuclear Sphinx of Tehran: Mahmoud Ahmadinejad and the State of Iran.

== Early life and education ==
Meir Javedanfar was born in Tehran to a family from Isfahan. He studied at the Ettefegh and Abrishami Jewish day schools in Tehran and for one year at the Shahid Mohammad Baqir Sadr Muslim day school in his neighborhood of Gisha. Eight months after his bar mitzvah in Tehran, in March 1987, Javedanfar's family moved to the United Kingdom as Jewish refugees from Iran.

Between 1992 and 1995, he studied a Business and Management studies B.Sc. at Salford University. From 1995–1996, Javedanfar studied the MA International Relations and Strategic Studies course at Lancaster University. His MA thesis was entitled "Israeli Motivations for Military Intervention in Lebanon: 1982 to Date (1996)". From 1997–1998, Javedanfar studied the MSc Manufacturing and Management Information Systems course at the University of the West of England. His MSc thesis was based on analysing the Information Technology systems of the Czech civilian aircraft manufacturer Let Kunovice. As part of his research, he lived for three months in the Czech city of Uherské Hradiště, South Moravia.

In May 2022, Javedanfar completed his PhD at Haifa University. His PhD thesis examined Mohammad Reza Shah's security decision-making in relation to Iraq and the Soviet Union.

== Career ==
In 2004, Javedanfar moved to Israel, and in 2005 he established a company, Middle East Economic and Political Analysis (MEEPAS), which he ran until 2019.

Since 2005, Javedanfar has published articles on Iran and Israel in several publications, including Foreign Affairs, Al-Monitor, The Diplomat, and The Guardian.

Javedanfar has taught various Iran-related courses at Reichman University since 2012 and has appeared as a guest lecturer in more than 20 universities and colleges. Since 2022, he has been a non-resident fellow at the Middle East Institute in Washington, D.C.

He speaks Persian, Hebrew, English, Spanish, and Portuguese.

== Books ==
- Javedanfar, Meir and Melman, Yossi. The Nuclear Sphinx of Tehran – Mahmoud Ahmadinejad and The State of Iran, Carroll & Graf, March 1, 2007. Translated into English, Hebrew, Dutch and Polish.
- Javedanfar, Meir. "The Islamic Republic of Iran: The Ministry of Information and Security (VAVAK)" chapter in book series PSI Handbook of Global Security and Intelligence: National Approaches, Praeger, April 30, 2008
