= Chaleh, Khorramabad =

Chaleh چاله
- Village
- Country: Iran
- Province: Lorestan
- County: Khorramabad
- Bakhsh: Papi
- Rural District: Gerit

Population (2006)
  - Total: 25
- Time zone: UTC+3:30 (IRST)

Chaleh (Persian: چاله) is a village in Gerit Rural District, Papi District, Khorramabad County, Lorestan Province, Iran. At the 2006 census, its population was 25, in 7 families.
