= Darbast-e Yek =

Darbast-e Yek داربست 1
- Village
- Location within Iran
- Coordinates: 28°52′56″N 55°45′40″E
- Country: Iran
- Province: Kerman
- County: Sirjan
- Bakhsh: Central
- Rural District: Golestan

Population (2006)
  - Total: 11
- Time zone: UTC+3:30 (IRST)
  - Summer (DST): UTC+4:30 (IRDT)

Darbast-e Yek (Persian: داربست 1, also Romanized as Dārbast-e Yek; also known as Dār Bast and Dārbast-e Bālā) is a village in Golestan Rural District, in the Central District of Sirjan County, Kerman Province, Iran. At the 2006 census, its population was 11, in 4 families.
