= Khamar, Republic of Dagestan =

Khamar Хамар ХӀамар
- Selo
- Location within Republic of Dagestan Location within Russia
- Coordinates: 42°05′N 46°23′E
- Country: Russia
- Region: Republic of Dagestan
- District: Tlyaratinsky District
- Time zone: UTC+3:00

Khamar (Russian: Хамар; Avar: ХӀамар) is a rural locality (a selo) in Tlyaratinsky Selsoviet, Tlyaratinsky District, Republic of Dagestan, Russia. Population: 180 (2010 census); 111 (2002 census); 307 (1989 Soviet census).

== Geography ==
Khamar is located 7 km southeast of Tlyarata (the district's administrative centre) by road. Cherel is the nearest rural locality.
