= Henguiyeh, Hormozgan =

City in Hormozgan province, Iran

Henguiyeh Persian: هنگوئيه
- City
- Location within Iran
- Coordinates: 27°04′08″N 54°00′27″E
- Country: Iran
- Province: Hormozgan
- County: Bastak
- District: Jenah

Population (2016)
  - Total: 4,295
- Time zone: UTC+3:30 (IRST)

Henguiyeh (Persian: هنگوئيه) (Note: Also romanized as Hongooyeh, Hongouyeh, Hongū’īyeh, and Hongūyeh; also known as Hongū, Hongūh, and Hungu) is a city in Jenah District of Bastak County, Hormozgan province, Iran.

== Demographics ==
=== Population ===
At the time of the 2006 National Census, Henguiyeh's population was 3,800 in 735 households, when it was a village in Faramarzan Rural District. The following census in 2011 counted 4,493 people in 1,016 households. The 2016 census measured the population of the village as 4,295 people in 1,140 households. It was the most populous village in its rural district.

After the census, Henguiyeh was elevated to the status of a city.
