= Maria Baptist =

German musician and professor

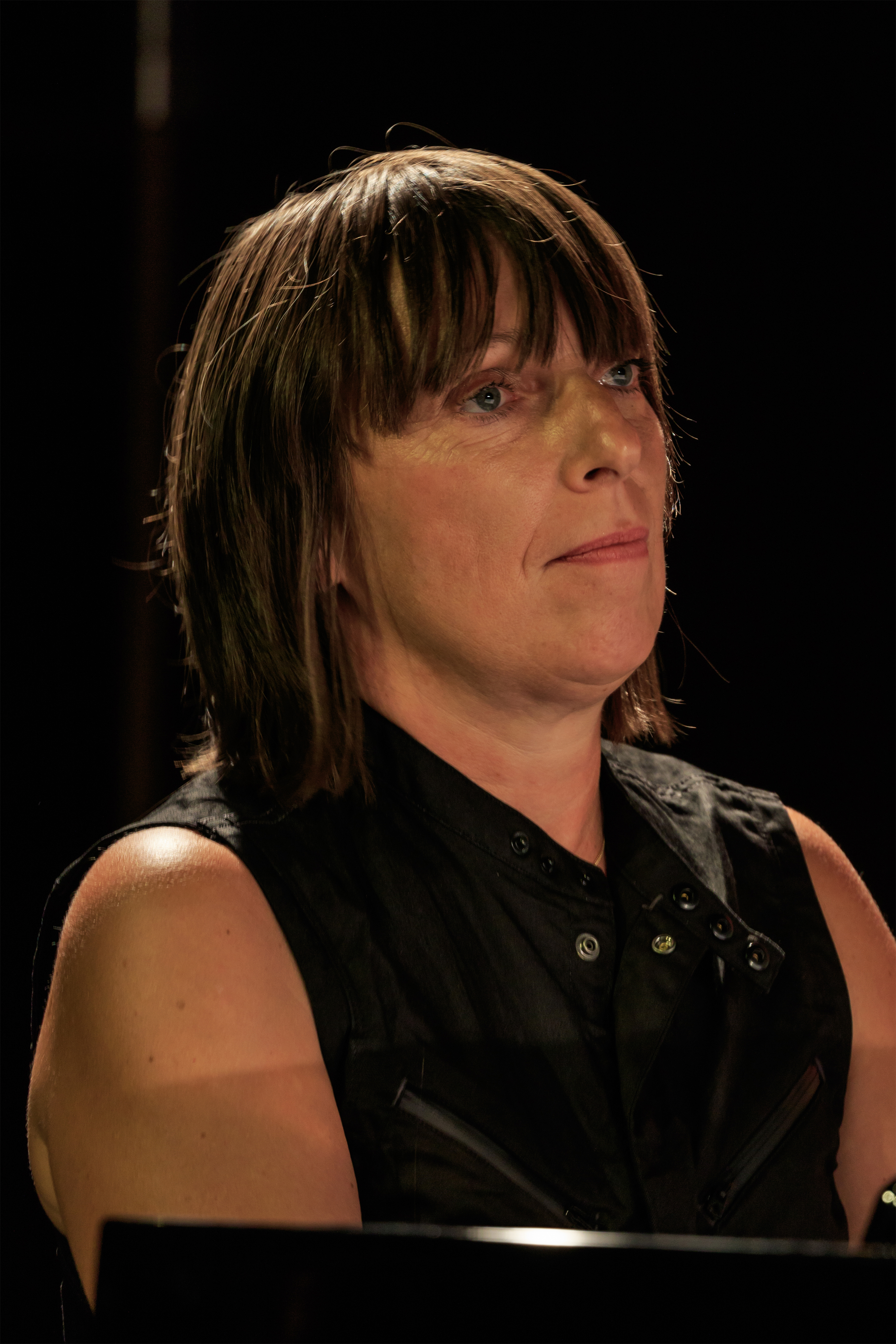

Background information
- Born: 30 August 1971; East Berlin
- Genres: Jazz, classical music
- Occupations: Pianist, composer
- Instrument: Piano
- Label: Maria Baptist Music
- Website: mariabaptist.com

Maria Baptist (born 30 August 1971) is a German musician (pianist, composer) and professor.

== Career ==
Baptist was born in 1971 in East Berlin in a musical family. Her grandfather was an orchestra musician and composer, her father is a pianist. Baptist discovered early her fascination for music and at the age of six she began playing the piano. At the age of eleven she composed her first pieces. Baptist developed her desire to become a classical concert pianist. At the age of fifteen she listened to recordings of Dave Brubeck and Keith Jarrett and discovered the world of jazz and improvisation. Impressed by the musical expression, Baptist felt that she had to continue on this path. She began studying piano at the music university in Berlin and won her first international piano competitions on improvisation.

When the Berlin Wall fell, it resulted in a change in her life. She took the opportunity to move to New York. Here Baptist experienced a freedom, which opened up new musical worlds to her. Baptist's artistic work was significantly influenced and inspired by the tremendous creativity, energy, living will, the strength and melancholy of the metropolis.

Baptist has a musical curiosity: her music is characterized by openness, she breaks up genre boundaries and there comes energy that builds up to a range of sounds. During her composition studies in New York with Maria Schneider, Baptist came into contact with the orchestral music. "Her music is a gift, infused with all the creativity, power, emotion, generosity and warmth that she exudes in life.“ commends the famous American big band composer the work of her Berlin colleague, Baptist.

Baptist returned to Berlin and was celebrated as a young talent by the press and her audience. During this time she won a series of internationally renowned competitions including the Leipzig jazz price, the hr Big Band Composition Contest, the prize of the Thad Jones Competition for full orchestra with the Danish Radio Jazz Orchestra in Copenhagen and the NDR Composers Competition. Baptist was invited to festivals and concerts throughout Europe. Well-known soloists such as Ingrid Jensen, Rolf Kühn & Gitte Haenning and ensembles such as the Rias Big Band, the hr Big Band & Budapest Jazz Orchestra, were working together with Baptist.

Parallel to all the concerts, Baptist finished her studies. Her curiosity was unlimited: In Berlin at the age of twenty-four, she started studying classical composition. Her two studies laid the foundation for a further focus of Baptist's career: the joy of teaching. At the age of twenty-six, when she was still a student, Baptist was already jazz teacher at the University of Music in Berlin. Since the age of twenty-nine she has been a guest professor at the University of Music "Hanns Eisler", where she teaches composition, arranging, improvisation and jazz theory.

Throughout her career Baptist published previously seven CDs (in a variety of instrumentations). She has no fear of contact with genre boundaries: as the first jazz pianist Baptist played Arnold Schoenberg's Pierrot Lunaire with jazz improvisations. Her latest Jazz Trio CD "Spring in Berlin“ offers an enormous variety of sounds: from chamber music influences, lyrical melodies to heavy grooving parts full of intensity and drive. Baptist works with contrasts, subtile moments with emotional deepness and is able to connect classical influences with Jazz in a very natural and gentle way without effort.The album is highly acclaimed by the press: „cool groove & cultivated touch with a great effect“ (Piano News). „Spring in Berlin“ is full of sunlight“ (Jazzthetik), a listening pleasure (Jazzpodium). Baptist knows how to make a Trio burn“, says a German reviewer.

Baptist entertains live audiences as a soloist, in the intimacy of the jazz trio, or as an orchestra conductor. She gave concerts in the United States, China, South Africa, Cuba, France, Iceland, Denmark, Greece, Sweden, Italy, Luxembourg, Hungary and Spain.

In 2010 she took part at the Reykjavik Jazz Festival. As a special concert experience Baptist conducted the Reykjavik Big Band. She composed an "Icelandic Suite“, which had the world premiere. In 2008 there was a collaboration with Baptist and the Reykjavik Big Band.

In 2011 Baptist combined her passion for conducting, composing and teaching. As a successor of Peter Herbolzheimer, she led the Federal Youth Orchestra of Germany. As a dedication to big cities, the concert program "City Grooves" premiered.

Maria Schneider (composer, arranger New York) about Baptist: "Her music is a gift, infused with all the creativity, power, emotion, generosity and warmth that she exudes in life."

== Professorship ==
Apart from her engagements as a performer and composer, Baptist has been a professor at the Hochschule für Musik "Hanns Eisler" Berlin since 2001. She teaches composition, arranging, improvisation and music theory.

In addition Baptist teachs at international workshops. She is a judge of different competitions and awards—as an example she was a jury member of the yearly jazz grant of the Berlin Senat in 2010.

== Workshops ==
- Workshop at the Film & Television Academy | Potsdam | 2010
- Workshop with the Big Band at the Jazz Institut in Berlin | 2009
- Bigband concert at the Academy of Music & Theatre Munich | 2009
- Workshop during a festival in Patras in the context of:”European capital of culture“ | Greece | 2006
- Conducting the Youth Bigband Jena | 2005
- Workshop at the International Chamber Music Festival | Stellenbosch/South Africa | 2005
- Workshop in Frankfurt am Main | 2002, 2006
- Conducting the Bigband at the Academy of Music & Theatre Hamburg | 2002
- Workshop with the Bigband of the Academy of Music "Hanns Eisler" Berlin | 2000
- Workshop at the Franz-Liszt Music Academy | Budapest/Hungary | 1998
- Conducting the Youth Bigband of Brandenburg | 1998

== Awards ==
- International Composers Competition of the Danish Radio Jazz Orchestra | Copenhagen | Thad Jones Composers Competition Award | 2000
- The German Radio Station Rundfunk Berlin-Brandenburg coproduces various CD Productions | 1999, 2003, 2005, 2009
- Conductors Competition of the German Radio Station Norddeutscher Rundfunk | Award | 1998
- Scholarship of the Berlin Senate | commission of a Bigband Suite | 1998
- Bigband Competition of the German Radio Station Hessischer Rundfunk | Composers Award | Frankfurt/Main | 1996
- Jazz Young Star Competition | Leipzig | Winner | 1996
- Commission of a Bigband piece of the Berlin Senate | 1996
- Bigband Competition of the German Radio Station Hessischer Rundfunk | Composers Award | Frankfurt/Main | 1995
- Artistic Grant of the Berlin Senate for studies in New York | 1995,1994
- International Piano Competition for Improvisation | Vilnius/Lithuania | Award | 1992

== Discography ==
- Maria Baptist TRIO: Spring in Berlin (2010)
- Maria Baptist & Telmo Pires: Sinal (2009)
- Opus 21 – Arnold Schoenberg: Pierrot lunaire plus Jazz Interludes by Maria Baptist (2007)
- Maria Baptist TRIO: Music for my Trio (2006)
- Maria Baptist: Sometimes Alone (2005)
- Maria Baptist TRIO: Crazy Dreams (2000)

== Compositions ==
Orchestra:

- Night Scenes for Jazztrio and Orchestra in 4 movements | 2009
- Night Scenes for Orchestra and Bigband | 2005
- Trilogy of a Metamorphose for Jazztrio and Orchestra | 2003
- Impressions of a journey for solo piano and string orchestra | 2003

Chamber:

- 9 Episodes for Piano and String Quartet | recorded in coproduction with rbb 2009, CD-Release 2011
- Short Trip in three movements for solo piano and chamber ensemble (11 Instruments) | 2007
- Impressions of a Journey in 3 Movements for Solo Piano + String Quartet | 2009
- Dezemberfarben for Brass ensemble | 2006
- Melody for You für Flöte und Kontrabass | 2005
- String quartet Nr. 1 in three movements | 2002
- Compositions for 3 voices, flute, clarinet, piano, percussion, violin, violoncello | 2002
- String quartet Klangdenkmal for the victims of the Holocaust | 2001
- String quartet Back and Forth | 1994
