= Jenah =

City in Hormozgan province, Iran

Jenah Persian: جناح
- City
- Location within Iran
- Coordinates: 27°01′12″N 54°17′02″E
- Country: Iran
- Province: Hormozgan
- County: Bastak
- District: Jenah

Population (2016)
  - Total: 6,910
- Time zone: UTC+3:30 (IRST)
- Website: www.janahonline.com

Jenah (Persian: جناح) (Note: Also romanized as Janāḩ, Jenāḩ, and Jonāḩ; also known as Chāleh, Farāmarzān, and Janna) is a city in, and the capital of, Jenah District of Bastak County, Hormozgan province, Iran. It also serves as the administrative center for Jenah Rural District. As a village, it was the capital of Faramarzan Rural District until its capital was transferred to the village of Kemeshk.

== Demographics ==
=== Population ===
At the time of the 2006 National Census, the city's population was 5,636 people in 1,322 households. The following census in 2011 counted 7,169 people in 1,627 households. The 2016 census measured the population of the city as 6,910 people in 1,854 households.
