= Kayhan London =

Persian-language newspaper

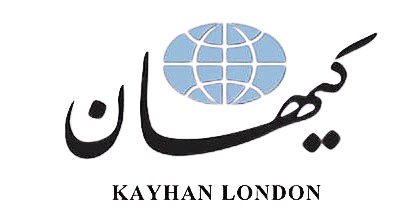
- Type: Online newspaper
- Founder: Mostafa Mesbahzadeh
- Editor-in-chief: Elahe Boghrat
- Managing editor: Nazenin Ansari
- Founded: 1 June 1984; 42 years ago
- Website: kayhan.london

Kayhan London is a Persian-language Iranian online media outlet based in London. Kayhan London and its English-language sister publication Kayhan Life focus on Iran and its presence on the international scene. Their news reports, articles, interviews, and opinion pieces cover Iran's politics, economy, society, environment and culture, nationally and internationally, and spotlight prominent figures of the large Iranian diaspora across the world.

Kayhan newspaper was founded in 1942 in Tehran by Mostafa Mesbahzadeh. By 1970's Kayhan had become the largest press group in the Middle East, with numerous publications and magazines. Mesbahzadeh revived the original newspaper four years after the 1979 Islamic revolution in London, under the label Kayhan (of) London. The paper turned digital in 2013. Kayhan Life was launched in 2019.

Kayhan London and Kayhan Life are privately owned, secular, with no political affiliation.

Kayhan London's liberal news reporting is considered anti-government by the Islamic Republic of Iran.

== History ==
The first issue of Kayhan London was published on 12 June 1983. It was available in a weekly paper format until 30 August 2013, when the newspaper ceased publication. An online version of the newspaper was launched in March 2015.

In 2020, Kayhan London, alongside several other newsmedia, was the subject of harassment by the Iranian Islamic government; according to Radio Free Europe, the purpose of the harassment was to "silence the only independent news sources for many Iranians".

== See also ==
- Anti-Iranian sentiment
