= Mostafa Mesbahzadeh =

Iranian journalist and politician

- مصطفی مصباح‌زاده
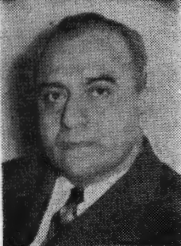
- Born: 18 August 1908; Shiraz, Iran
- Died: 25 November 2006 (aged 98); San Diego, California, U.S.
- Education: Doctor of Law
- Alma mater: Sorbonne University
- Occupations: Journalist, Publisher, and Politician
- Known for: Member of the Senate of Iran; Co-founder of the Kayhan newspaper
- Spouse: Forough-Azam Ettehadiyeh
- Partner: Forough-Azam Ettehadiyeh
- Children: 3
- Relatives: Iraj Mesbahzadeh, Parviz Mesbahzadeh, Nazenine Mesbahzadeh, Farhad Moshiri
- Awards: Legion of Honor

Academic background
- Thesis: La politique de l'Iran dans la Société des nations (1936)

Academic work
- Institutions: University of Tehran

Mostafa Khan Mesbahzadeh (Persian: مصطفی مصباح‌زاده; August 18, 1908 – December 25, 2006) was an Iranian Publisher, President of Kayhan Media Corporation, Founder of the Iranian College of Press and Communication ("Daneshkadeh-ye Matbou'at va Oloum-e Ejtema'i", Persian: دانشکده مطبوعات و علوم اجتماعی), University Professor, Member of Parliament and Senator, Member of the Senate of Iran.

Together with Abdolrahman Faramarzi, Mesbahzadeh co-founded in 1942 the daily newspaper Kayhan. Dr. Mostafa Mesbahzadeh turned Kayhan into the largest media group in the Middle East, with daily and weekly publications, magazines dedicated to youth, to sports (Kayhan-e Varzeshi), to children (Kayhan-e Bachcheha), to women (Zan-e Rouz), and international edition in English (Kayhan International).

== Background ==
Mostafa Mesbahzadeh was born on 18 November 1908 in Shiraz. He was one of the students sent to Europe by the Iranian government during the reign of Reza Shah Pahlavi. He returned to Iran after obtaining a doctorate in criminal law from Sorbonne University in 1936 and began teaching at the University of Tehran.

In 1942, Dr. Mesbahzadeh founded Kayhan with the help of Mohammad Reza Shah Pahlavi.

After the revolution, the Kayhan newspaper was confiscated by the revolutionary government. Mesbahzadeh, who was living in London at the time, gathered a number of writers and journalists who had fled the country to publish a weekly newspaper called Kayhan-in-exile; it was later known as Kayhan London.

After a long period of illness, Mostafa Mesbahzadeh died on 25 November 2006 in San Diego.

== Bibliography ==
- Milani, Abbas (2008). Eminent Persians: The Men and Women Who Made Modern Iran, 1941-1979. Vol. 1. pp. 399–405.
