= Jenah Rural District =

Rural district in Hormozgan province, Iran

Jenah Rural District Persian: دهستان جناح
- Rural District
- Location within Iran
- Coordinates: 27°07′51″N 54°08′53″E
- Country: Iran
- Province: Hormozgan
- County: Bastak
- District: Jenah
- Capital: Jenah

Population (2016)
  - Total: 3,935
- Time zone: UTC+3:30 (IRST)

Jenah Rural District (Persian: دهستان جناح) is in Jenah District of Bastak County, Hormozgan province, Iran. It is administered from the city of Jenah.

== Demographics ==
=== Population ===
At the time of the 2006 National Census, the rural district's population was 5,760 in 1,180 households. There were 7,647 inhabitants in 1,702 households at the following census of 2011. The 2016 census measured the population of the rural district as 3,935 in 1,014 households. The most populous of its 12 villages was Kahtuiyeh, with 1,584 people.
