= Kayhan =

Daily newspaper in Tehran, Iran

- Type: Daily newspaper
- Format: Broadsheet
- Owner: Kayhan Institute
- Founder(s): Abdolrahman Faramarzi; Mostafa Mesbahzadeh
- Editor: Hossein Shariatmadari
- Founded: 27 May 1942; 84 years ago
- Political alignment: Conservatism (Iranian)
- Headquarters: Ferdowsi Street, Tehran, Iran
- OCLC number: 473890618
- Website: kayhan.ir

Kayhan (Persian: کيهان, lit. 'The Cosmos') is a Persian-language newspaper published in Tehran, Iran. It is considered "the most conservative and hard-line Iranian newspaper." Hossein Shariatmadari is the editor-in-chief of Kayhan. According to the report of the New York Times in 2007, his official position is representative of the Supreme Leader of Iran.

Kayhan has about 1,000 employees worldwide. There are conflicting reports about its circulation numbers: in 2006 the BBC gave it as 60,000–100,000 copies, in 2007 the New York Times gave "about 70,000", and in 2008 a New York University School of Law journal article reported it as 350,000 copies. Kayhan also publishes special foreign editions, which include the English-language Kayhan International.

== History and profile ==
‘‘Kayhan’’ was founded in February 1943. by Abdolrahman Faramarzi and Mostafa Mesbahzadeh. The newspaper was established after the young Mohammad Reza Pahlavi provided Mesbahzadeh with a gift of $50,000 to help launch the publication. Within its first year, Kayhan became one of the five highest-circulation daily newspapers in Tehran. Mostafa Mesbahzadeh initially served as editor-in-chief before later exchanging roles with Faramarzi. The paper supported Shah Mohammed Reza Pahlavi during his reign. Published in Iran as well as in London, the newspaper had a circulation greater than one million prior to the 1979 Islamic Revolution. In 1974 the Kayhan media group described itself as “the largest newspaper and magazine publishing house in the Middle East”. Forugh Mesbahzadeh, the wife of Mostafa Mesbahzadeh, officially served as the manager of the leading Iranian women’s magazine, ‘’Zan-e Rooz’’.

During the clashes between the Imperial forces and revolutionaries, Kayhan and Ettela'at were censored. After the overthrow of the Shah all of Mesbahzadeh's assets were seized, including the publishing plant, which was the main headquarters of the daily. Following the revolution Kayhan became a state-sponsored publication together with Ettela'at and Jomhouri-e Eslami of which publishers are directly appointed by the Supreme Leader.

In May 1980, Ayatollah Khomeini named Ebrahim Yazdi, then foreign minister, as head of the daily. Under the guidance of Mesbahzadeh, the London office of Kayhan continued its work and publishes a monarchist weekly issue known as Kayhan London, which has a small circulation. In 2006, Mesbahzadeh died at the age of 98 in Los Angeles, California.

The paper focuses on political, cultural, social and economic news.

== The last editor before the revolution ==
The last editor of Kayhan newspaper was Amir Taheri until the beginning of the revolution. With the approach of the 1979 revolution, a new editorial council was formed within Kayhan, headed by Rahman Hatfi. From 1961 to 1966, Houshang Amiari was the director of the caricature department, overseeing themes of humorous paintings. Hossein Rezaei was the director of the news section of this newspaper from 1965 to 1979.

== Political orientation ==
Kayhan supports the Iranian government and the policies of former President Mahmoud Ahmadinejad. Shariatmadari stated that the newspaper and its staff "defend the ideology of the Islamic Revolution." Gareth Smyth, the former Iran correspondent of the Financial Times, contends that Kayhan articulates the political views of the "regime's fundamentalist camp."

Shariatmadari rejects the labels "conservative" and "fundamentalist," which he had said "...make us sound like the Taliban." Instead, he calls himself and those with similar views "principlists". The Principlist faction comprises the majority of the Iranian Parliament. This group is also referred to as the "neo-principlists" and includes such figures as Gholamali Haddad Adel and Saeed Jalili among the others. In fact, the daily is the print media outlet of the group.

== Controversies ==
The newspaper became controversial in 2010 for iterating an unequivocal condemnation of then-French First Lady Carla Bruni for her open letter about the death sentence against Sakineh Mohammadi Ashtiani for adultery and alleged murder. The newspaper called Bruni an "Italian prostitute" and "the singer and decadent actress who managed to break [up] the Sarkozy family" who "deserves to die" for her "perverted lifestyle," reiterating the striking similarities between Ashtiani and Bruni, and also condemned actress Isabelle Adjani as a prostitute. The French foreign ministry condemned the comments as "unacceptable" and summoned the Iranian ambassador to France. The Iranian foreign ministry sought to distance itself from Kayhan's comments, with spokesman Ramin Mehmanparast stating that "The media can properly criticize the wrong and hostile policies of other countries by refraining from using insulting words. This is not correct."

In 2020, following the expulsion of Médecins Sans Frontières (MSF) from Iran, Kayhan's editor, Hossein Shariatmadari, described the MSF as an "American puppet" because it is "based in France and all anti-Iranian groups have a base in France. On 28 April 2022, the same day as Yom HaShoah, Kayhan published an opinion piece in the front page praising Adolf Hitler and promoting anti-semitic tropes.

After a Lebanese-American suspect stabbed the Indian-born author Salman Rushdie on 12 August 2022, Kayhan responded by congratulating "a thousand bravos ... to the brave and dutiful person who attacked the apostate and evil Salman Rushdie in New York... The hand of the man who tore the neck of God's enemy must be kissed".

== See also ==
- List of newspapers in Iran
- Kayhan London
