= Faramarzan Rural District =

Rural district in Hormozgan province, Iran

Faramarzan Rural District Persian: دهستان فرامرزان
- Rural District
- Location within Iran
- Coordinates: 27°03′10″N 53°58′22″E
- Country: Iran
- Province: Hormozgan
- County: Bastak
- District: Jenah
- Capital: Kemeshk

Population (2016)
  - Total: 12,729
- Time zone: UTC+3:30 (IRST)

Faramarzan Rural District (Persian: دهستان فرامرزان) is in Jenah District of Bastak County, Hormozgan province, Iran. Its capital is the village of Kemeshk. The previous capital of the rural district was the village of Jenah, now a city.

== Demographics ==
=== Population ===
At the time of the 2006 National Census, the rural district's population was 10,720 in 2,105 households. There were 12,594 inhabitants in 2,875 households at the following census of 2011. The 2016 census measured the population of the rural district as 12,729 in 3,371 households. The most populous of its 10 villages was Henguiyeh (now a city), with 4,295 people.
