= Jenah District =

District in Hormozgan province, Iran

Jenah District Persian: بخش جناح
- District
- Location within Iran
- Coordinates: 27°07′51″N 54°06′56″E
- Country: Iran
- Province: Hormozgan
- County: Bastak
- Capital: Jenah

Population (2016)
  - Total: 23,574
- Time zone: UTC+3:30 (IRST)

Jenah District (Persian: بخش جناح) is in Bastak County, Hormozgan province, Iran. Its capital is the city of Jenah.

== History ==
After the 2016 National Census, the village of Henguiyeh was elevated to the status of a city.

== Demographics ==
=== Population ===
At the time of the 2006 census, the district's population was 22,116 in 4,607 households. The following census in 2011 counted 27,410 people in 6,204 households. The 2016 census measured the population of the district as 23,574 inhabitants in 6,239 households.

=== Administrative divisions ===
Jenah District Population
Administrative Divisions	2006	2011	2016
Faramarzan RD	10,720	12,594	12,729
Jenah RD	5,760	7,647	3,935
Henguiyeh (city) (Note: Became a city after the 2016 census)			
Jenah (city)	5,636	7,169	6,910
Total	22,116	27,410	23,574
RD = Rural District
