= Saadatabad =

Saadatabad is the former name of Saadat Shahr, a city in Fars Province, Iran.

Saadatabad (Persian: سعادت اباد) may also refer to:

== Fars Province ==
- Saadatabad, Abadeh, a village in Abadeh County
- Saadatabad, Arsanjan, a village in Arsanjan County
- Saadatabad, Darab, a village in Darab County
- Saadatabad, Firuzabad, a village in Firuzabad County
- Saadatabad, Mamasani, a village in Mamasani County
- Saadatabad, Marvdasht, a village in Marvdasht County
- Saadatabad-e Olya, a village in Marvdasht County
- Saadatabad-e Sofla, a village in Marvdasht County
- Saadatabad-e Vasat, a village in Marvdasht County
- Saadatabad, Sarvestan, a village in Sarvestan County
- Saadatabad, Sepidan, a village in Sepidan County
- Saadatabad, Shiraz, a village in Shiraz County

== Hormozgan Province ==
- Saadatabad, Hormozgan

== Isfahan Province ==
- Saadatabad, Isfahan, a village in Isfahan County
- Saadatabad, Semirom, a village in Semirom County
- Saadatabad, Padena-ye Sofla, a village in Semirom County
- Saadatabad, Padena-ye Vosta, a village in Semirom County

== Kerman Province ==
- Saadatabad, Kerman
- Saadatabad, Bardsir, Kerman Province
- Saadatabad, Golbaf, Kerman County, Kerman Province
- Saadatabad, Narmashir, Kerman Province
- Saadatabad-e Golshan, Narmashir County, Kerman Province
- Saadatabad, Rafsanjan, Kerman Province
- Saadatabad, Sirjan, Kerman Province
- Saadatabad Rural District, in Kerman Province

== Khuzestan Province ==
- Saadatabad, Khuzestan

== Kohgiluyeh and Boyer-Ahmad Province ==
- Saadatabad, Kohgiluyeh and Boyer-Ahmad
- Saadatabad-e Lishtar, Kohgiluyeh and Boyer-Ahmad Province

== Markazi Province ==
- Saadatabad, Markazi

== Mazandaran Province ==
- Saadatabad, Mazandaran

== Razavi Khorasan Province ==
- Saadatabad, Rashtkhvar, Razavi Khorasan Province

== Tehran Province ==
- Sa'adat Abad, neighbourhood of Tehran

== See also ==
- Sadatabad (disambiguation)
