= Chahar Bisheh =

Chahar Bisheh (Persian: چهاربيشه) may refer to various places in Iran:

- Chahar Bisheh, Fars
- Chahar Bisheh, Izeh, Khuzestan Province
- Chahar Bisheh, Masjed Soleyman, Khuzestan Province
- Chahar Bisheh-ye Olya, Kohgiluyeh and Boyer-Ahmad Province
- Chahar Bisheh-ye Sofla, Kohgiluyeh and Boyer-Ahmad Province
- Chahar Bisheh District Poultry Facility, Kohgiluyeh and Boyer-Ahmad Province
- Chahar Bisheh Industrial Estate, Kohgiluyeh and Boyer-Ahmad Province
