= Sadatabad =

Sadatabad (Persian: سادات اباد) may refer to:

- Sadatabad, Eqlid, Fars Province
- Sadatabad, Shiraz, Fars Province
- Sadatabad, Hamadan
- Sadatabad, Isfahan
- Sadatabad, Kohgiluyeh and Boyer-Ahmad
- Sadatabad-e Lishtar, Kohgiluyeh and Boyer-Ahmad Province

== See also ==
- Saadatabad (disambiguation)
