= Ab Anjir =

Ab Anjir (Persian: اب انجير) may refer to various places in Iran:

- Ab Anjir, Darab, Fars Province
- Ab Anjir, Jahrom, Fars Province
- Ab Anjir, Kerman
- Ab Anjir-e Olya, Kohgiluyeh and Boyer-Ahmad Province
- Ab Anjir-e Sofla, Kohgiluyeh and Boyer-Ahmad
