= Shams-e Arab Abdollahi =

Shams-e Arab Abdollahi شمس عرب عبدالهي
- Village
- Location within Iran
- Coordinates: 30°24′23″N 50°36′53″E
- Country: Iran
- Province: Kohgiluyeh and Boyer-Ahmad
- County: Gachsaran
- Bakhsh: Central
- Rural District: Lishtar

Population (2006)
  - Total: 58
- Time zone: UTC+3:30 (IRST)
  - Summer (DST): UTC+4:30 (IRDT)

Shams-e Arab Abdollahi (Persian: شمس عرب عبدالهي, also Romanized as Shams-e ʿArab ʿAbdollahī; also known as Shams-e ʿArab) is a village in Lishtar Rural District, in the Central District of Gachsaran County, Kohgiluyeh and Boyer-Ahmad Province, Iran. At the 2006 census, its population was 58, in 14 families.
