= Ab Jirak =

Village in the Kohgiluyeh and Boyer-Ahmad Province, Iran

Ab Jirak اب جيرك
- Village
- Location within Iran
- Coordinates: 30°29′05″N 50°40′40″E
- Country: Iran
- Province: Kohgiluyeh and Boyer-Ahmad
- County: Gachsaran
- Bakhsh: Central
- Rural District: Lishtar

Population (2006)
  - Total: 287
- Time zone: UTC+3:30 (IRST)
  - Summer (DST): UTC+4:30 (IRDT)

Ab Jirak (Persian: اب جيرك, also Romanized as Āb Jīrak; also known as Āb Chīrak) is a village in Lishtar Rural District, in the Central District of Gachsaran County, Kohgiluyeh and Boyer-Ahmad Province, Iran. At the 2006 census, its population was 287, in 63 families.
