= Kheyrabad Khalifeh =

Kheyrabad Khalifeh خيرابادخليفه
- Village
- Location within Iran
- Coordinates: 30°32′39″N 50°31′43″E
- Country: Iran
- Province: Kohgiluyeh and Boyer-Ahmad
- County: Gachsaran
- Bakhsh: Central
- Rural District: Lishtar

Population (2006)
  - Total: 473
- Time zone: UTC+3:30 (IRST)
  - Summer (DST): UTC+4:30 (IRDT)

Kheyrabad Khalifeh (Persian: خيرابادخليفه, also Romanized as Kheyrābād Khalīfeh; also known as Deh-e Kahlīfeh, Deh-e Khahlīfeh, Deh Kahlīfeh, and Vaḩdatābād) is a village in Lishtar Rural District, in the Central District of Gachsaran County, Kohgiluyeh and Boyer-Ahmad Province, Iran. At the 2006 census, its population was 473, in 100 families.
