= Sar Tirah =

Sar Tirah سرتيره
- Village
- Location within Iran
- Coordinates: 30°37′55″N 50°44′38″E
- Country: Iran
- Province: Kohgiluyeh and Boyer-Ahmad
- County: Gachsaran
- Bakhsh: Central
- Rural District: Boyer Ahmad-e Garmsiri

Population (2006)
  - Total: 214
- Time zone: UTC+3:30 (IRST)
  - Summer (DST): UTC+4:30 (IRDT)

Sar Tirah (Persian: سرتيره, also Romanized as Sar Tīrah; also known as Sar Gīrah) is a village in Boyer Ahmad-e Garmsiri Rural District, in the Central District of Gachsaran County, Kohgiluyeh and Boyer-Ahmad Province, Iran. At the 2006 census, its population was 214, in 40 families.
