= Gowd-e Gol-e Bibi Hakimeh =

Gowd-e Gol-e Bibi Hakimeh گودگل بي بي حكميه
- Village
- Location within Iran
- Coordinates: 30°07′14″N 50°40′01″E
- Country: Iran
- Province: Kohgiluyeh and Boyer-Ahmad
- County: Gachsaran
- Bakhsh: Central
- Rural District: Bibi Hakimeh

Population (2006)
  - Total: 39
- Time zone: UTC+3:30 (IRST)
  - Summer (DST): UTC+4:30 (IRDT)

Gowd-e Gol-e Bibi Hakimeh (Persian: گودگل بي بي حكميه, also Romanized as Gowd-e Gol-e Bībī Ḩakīmeh; also known as Gowd-e Gol, Gowd-e Kol Bībī Ḩakīmeh, and Gowd Gol) is a village in Bibi Hakimeh Rural District, in the Central District of Gachsaran County, Kohgiluyeh and Boyer-Ahmad Province, Iran. At the 2006 census, its population was 39, in 9 families.
