= Mir Aziz =

Mir Aziz ميرعزيز
- Village
- Location within Iran
- Coordinates: 30°27′06″N 50°34′07″E
- Country: Iran
- Province: Kohgiluyeh and Boyer-Ahmad
- County: Gachsaran
- Bakhsh: Central
- Rural District: Lishtar

Population (2006)
  - Total: 25
- Time zone: UTC+3:30 (IRST)
  - Summer (DST): UTC+4:30 (IRDT)

Mir Aziz (Persian: ميرعزيز, also Romanized as Mīr ‘Azīz) is a village in Lishtar Rural District, in the Central District of Gachsaran County, Kohgiluyeh and Boyer-Ahmad Province, Iran. At the 2006 census, its population was 25, in 5 families.
