= Pakuh =

Pakuh (Persian: پاكوه) may refer to:

- Pakuh, Isfahan
- Pakuh, Kohgiluyeh and Boyer-Ahmad
- Pakuh-e Sefid
