= Ab Rigun =

Ab Rigun اب ريگون
- Village
- Location within Iran
- Coordinates: 30°26′14″N 50°47′38″E
- Country: Iran
- Province: Kohgiluyeh and Boyer-Ahmad
- County: Gachsaran
- Bakhsh: Central
- Rural District: Emamzadeh Jafar

Population (2006)
  - Total: 292
- Time zone: UTC+3:30 (IRST)
  - Summer (DST): UTC+4:30 (IRDT)

Ab Rigun (Persian: اب ريگون, also Romanized as Āb Rīgūn and Āb-e Rīgūn) is a village in Emamzadeh Jafar Rural District, in the Central District of Gachsaran County, Kohgiluyeh and Boyer-Ahmad province, Iran. At the 2006 census, its population was 292, in 73 families.
