= Bibi Hakimeh =

Bibi Hakimeh بي بي حكميه
- Village
- Location within Iran
- Coordinates: 30°02′28″N 50°36′16″E
- Country: Iran
- Province: Kohgiluyeh and Boyer-Ahmad
- County: Gachsaran
- Bakhsh: Central
- Rural District: Bibi Hakimeh

Population (2006)
  - Total: 134
- Time zone: UTC+3:30 (IRST)
  - Summer (DST): UTC+4:30 (IRDT)

Bibi Hakimeh (Persian: بي بي حكميه, also Romanized as Bībī Ḩakīmeh; also known as Bībi Hakim) is a village in Bibi Hakimeh Rural District, in the Central District of Gachsaran County, Kohgiluyeh and Boyer-Ahmad Province, Iran. At the 2006 census, its population was 134, in 25 families.
