= Parhuz-e Talkhab Shirin =

Parhuz-e Talkhab Shirin پارحوض تلخاب شيرين
- Village
- Country: Iran
- Province: Kohgiluyeh and Boyer-Ahmad
- County: Gachsaran
- Bakhsh: Central
- Rural District: Emamzadeh Jafar

Population (2006)
  - Total: 20
- Time zone: UTC+3:30 (IRST)
  - Summer (DST): UTC+4:30 (IRDT)

Parhuz-e Talkhab Shirin (Persian: پارحوض تلخاب شيرين, also Romanized as Pārḥūz̤-e Talkhāb Shīrīn) is a village in Emamzadeh Jafar Rural District, in the Central District of Gachsaran County, Kohgiluyeh and Boyer-Ahmad Province, Iran. In the 2006 census, its population was 20, in 4 families.
