= Pasheh Kan =

Pasheh Kan پشه كان
- Village
- Location within Iran
- Coordinates: 30°19′10″N 50°48′47″E
- Country: Iran
- Province: Kohgiluyeh and Boyer-Ahmad
- County: Gachsaran
- Bakhsh: Central
- Rural District: Emamzadeh Jafar

Population (2006)
  - Total: 562
- Time zone: UTC+3:30 (IRST)
  - Summer (DST): UTC+4:30 (IRDT)

Pasheh Kan (Persian: پشه كان, also Romanized as Pasheh Kān and Pashahkān also known as Borj-e Pashgān, Pasheh Gān, Pashekān, and Pashkān) is a village in Emamzadeh Jafar Rural District, in the Central District of Gachsaran County, Kohgiluyeh and Boyer-Ahmad Province, Iran. At the 2006 census, its population was 562, in 129 families.
