= Talkhab-e Shirin =

Talkhab-e Shirin تلخاب شيرين
- Village
- Location within Iran
- Coordinates: 30°19′32″N 50°54′39″E
- Country: Iran
- Province: Kohgiluyeh and Boyer-Ahmad
- County: Gachsaran
- Bakhsh: Central
- Rural District: Emamzadeh Jafar

Population (2006)
  - Total: 1,145
- Time zone: UTC+3:30 (IRST)
  - Summer (DST): UTC+4:30 (IRDT)

Talkhab-e Shirin (Persian: تلخاب شيرين, also Romanized as Talkhāb-e Shīrīn and Talkh Āb-e Shīrīn) is a village in Emamzadeh Jafar Rural District, in the Central District of Gachsaran County, Kohgiluyeh and Boyer-Ahmad Province, Iran. At the 2006 census, its population was 1,145, in 233 families.
