= Bibi Janabad =

Bibi Janabad بي بي جان اباد
- Village
- Location within Iran
- Coordinates: 30°15′49″N 50°45′44″E
- Country: Iran
- Province: Kohgiluyeh and Boyer-Ahmad
- County: Gachsaran
- Bakhsh: Central
- Rural District: Emamzadeh Jafar

Population (2006)
  - Total: 928
- Time zone: UTC+3:30 (IRST)
  - Summer (DST): UTC+4:30 (IRDT)

Bibi Janabad (Persian: بي بي جان اباد, also Romanized as Bībī Jānābād; also known as Bābā’ī, Bābā’ī Jānābād, and Jānābād) is a village in Emamzadeh Jafar Rural District, in the Central District of Gachsaran County, Kohgiluyeh and Boyer-Ahmad Province, Iran. At the 2006 census, its population was 928, in 197 families.
