= Mohammadabad-e Lishtar =

Mohammadabad محمدابادليشتر
- Village
- Location within Iran
- Coordinates: 30°25′01″N 50°32′13″E
- Country: Iran
- Province: Kohgiluyeh and Boyer-Ahmad
- County: Gachsaran
- Bakhsh: Central
- Rural District: Lishtar

Population (2006)
  - Total: 231
- Time zone: UTC+3:30 (IRST)
  - Summer (DST): UTC+4:30 (IRDT)

Mohammadabad (Persian: محمدابادليشتر, also Romanized as Moḩammadābād-e Līshtar; also known as Moḩammad and Moḩammadābād) is a village in Lishtar Rural District, in the Central District of Gachsaran County, Kohgiluyeh and Boyer-Ahmad Province, Iran. At the 2006 census, its population was 231, in 40 families.
