= Ab Kel Shisheh =

Ab Kel Shisheh اب كل شيشه
- Village
- Location within Iran
- Coordinates: 30°23′45″N 50°34′44″E
- Country: Iran
- Province: Kohgiluyeh and Boyer-Ahmad
- County: Gachsaran
- Bakhsh: Central
- Rural District: Lishtar

Population (2006)
  - Total: 296
- Time zone: UTC+3:30 (IRST)
  - Summer (DST): UTC+4:30 (IRDT)

Ab Kel Shisheh (Persian: اب كل شيشه, also Romanized as Āb Kel Shīsheh; also known as Āb Kel and Ābkel) is a village in Lishtar Rural District, in the Central District of Gachsaran County, Kohgiluyeh and Boyer-Ahmad Province, Iran. At the 2006 census, its population was 296, in 50 families.
