= Lishtar =

Lishtar (Persian: ليشتر) may refer to:

- Ali Abad-e Lishtar
- Lishtar-e Bala
- Lishtar Rural District
