= Anjir Siah =

Anjir Siah or Anjir-e Siah or Anjir-e Siyah or Anjir Seyah (Persian: انجيرسياه) may refer to various places in Iran:

- Anjir Siah-e Olya, Kerman Province
- Anjir Siah, Gachsaran, Kohgiluyeh and Boyer-Ahmad Province
- Anjir-e Siah, alternate name of Anjir-e Sefid, Kohgiluyeh and Boyer-Ahmad Province
