= Sheykh Khvajeh =

Village in Kohgiluyeh and Boyer-Ahmad, Iran

Sheykh Khvajeh شيخ خواجه
- Village
- Location within Iran
- Coordinates: 30°24′16″N 50°54′03″E
- Country: Iran
- Province: Kohgiluyeh and Boyer-Ahmad
- County: Gachsaran
- Bakhsh: Central
- Rural District: Emamzadeh Jafar

Population (2006)
  - Total: 27
- Time zone: UTC+3:30 (IRST)
  - Summer (DST): UTC+4:30 (IRDT)

Sheykh Khvajeh (Persian: شيخ خواجه, also Romanized as Sheykh Khvājeh; also known as Sheykh Khvājeh-ye Bālā and Sheykh Khvājeh-ye ‘Olyā) is a village in Emamzadeh Jafar Rural District, in the Central District of Gachsaran County, Kohgiluyeh and Boyer-Ahmad Province, Iran. At the 2006 census, its population was 27, in 6 families.
