= Dezh Soleyman =

Dezh Soleyman دژسليمان
- Village
- Location within Iran
- Coordinates: 30°19′23″N 50°40′47″E
- Country: Iran
- Province: Kohgiluyeh and Boyer-Ahmad
- County: Gachsaran
- Bakhsh: Central
- Rural District: Lishtar

Population (2006)
  - Total: 361
- Time zone: UTC+3:30 (IRST)
  - Summer (DST): UTC+4:30 (IRDT)

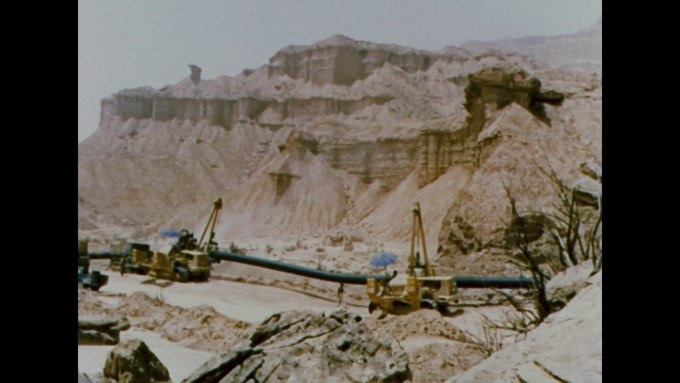
تصویر دژسلیمان - در سال 1341 شمسی

Dezh Soleyman (Persian: دژسليمان, also Romanized as Dezh Soleymān) is a village in Lishtar Rural District, in the Central District of Gachsaran County, Kohgiluyeh and Boyer-Ahmad Province, Iran. At the 2006 census, its population was 361, in 89 families.
