= Godar Shahri =

Godar Shahri گدارشهري
- Village
- Location within Iran
- Coordinates: 30°38′41″N 50°46′23″E
- Country: Iran
- Province: Kohgiluyeh and Boyer-Ahmad
- County: Gachsaran
- Bakhsh: Central
- Rural District: Boyer Ahmad-e Garmsiri

Population (2006)
  - Total: 16
- Time zone: UTC+3:30 (IRST)
  - Summer (DST): UTC+4:30 (IRDT)

Godar Shahri (Persian: گدارشهري, also Romanized as Godār Shahrī) is a village in Boyer Ahmad-e Garmsiri Rural District, in the Central District of Gachsaran County, Kohgiluyeh and Boyer-Ahmad Province, Iran. At the 2006 census, its population was 16, in 6 families.
