= Khalafabad-e Lishtar =

Khalafabad-e Lishtar خلف ابادليشتر
- Village
- Location within Iran
- Coordinates: 30°24′10″N 50°37′52″E
- Country: Iran
- Province: Kohgiluyeh and Boyer-Ahmad
- County: Gachsaran
- Bakhsh: Central
- Rural District: Lishtar

Population (2006)
  - Total: 29
- Time zone: UTC+3:30 (IRST)
  - Summer (DST): UTC+4:30 (IRDT)

Khalafabad-e Lishtar (Persian: خلف ابادليشتر, also Romanized as Khalafābād-e Līshtar; also known as Khalafābād) is a village in Lishtar Rural District, in the Central District of Gachsaran County, Kohgiluyeh and Boyer-Ahmad Province, Iran. At the 2006 census, its population was 29, in 7 families.
