= Askan Ashayir-e Kolagh Neshin =

Askan Ashayir-e Kolagh Neshin اسكان عشايركلاغ نشين
- Village
- Country: Iran
- Province: Kohgiluyeh and Boyer-Ahmad
- County: Gachsaran
- Bakhsh: Central
- Rural District: Emamzadeh Jafar

Population (2006)
  - Total: 168
- Time zone: UTC+3:30 (IRST)
  - Summer (DST): UTC+4:30 (IRDT)

Askan Ashayir-e Kolagh Neshin (Persian: اسكان عشايركلاغ نشين, also Romanized as Askān ʿAshāyīr-e Kolāgh Neshīn) is a village in Emamzadeh Jafar Rural District, in the Central District of Gachsaran County, Kohgiluyeh and Boyer-Ahmad Province, Iran. At the 2006 census, its population was 168, in 36 families.
