= Shambarakan =

Shambarakan شامبراكان
- Village
- Location within Iran
- Coordinates: 30°37′32″N 50°43′33″E
- Country: Iran
- Province: Kohgiluyeh and Boyer-Ahmad
- County: Gachsaran
- Bakhsh: Central
- Rural District: Boyer Ahmad-e Garmsiri

Population (2006)
  - Total: 193
- Time zone: UTC+3:30 (IRST)
  - Summer (DST): UTC+4:30 (IRDT)

Shambarakan (Persian: شامبراكان, also Romanized as Shāmbarākān, Shāmbrākān, and Shāmbarakān; also known as Shāmbarakūn) is a village in Boyer Ahmad-e Garmsiri Rural District, in the Central District of Gachsaran County, Kohgiluyeh and Boyer-Ahmad Province, Iran. At the 2006 census, its population was 193, in 40 families.
