= Khang Bonar =

Khang Bonar خنگ بنار
- Village
- Country: Iran
- Province: Kohgiluyeh and Boyer-Ahmad
- County: Gachsaran
- Bakhsh: Central
- Rural District: Emamzadeh Jafar

Population (2006)
  - Total: 17
- Time zone: UTC+3:30 (IRST)
  - Summer (DST): UTC+4:30 (IRDT)

Khang Bonar (Persian: خنگ بنار, also Romanized as Khang Bonār) is a village in Emamzadeh Jafar Rural District in the Central District of Gachsaran County, Kohgiluyeh and Boyer-Ahmad Province, Iran. In the 2006 census its population was 17 people spread across five families.
