= Ab Hajjat-e Chahar Bisheh =

Ab Hajjat-e Chahar Bisheh آب حاجت چهار بيشه
- Village
- Location within Iran
- Coordinates: 30°27′31″N 50°41′21″E
- Country: Iran
- Province: Kohgiluyeh and Boyer-Ahmad
- County: Gachsaran
- Bakhsh: Central
- Rural District: Lishtar

Population (2006)
  - Total: 23
- Time zone: UTC+3:30 (IRST)
  - Summer (DST): UTC+4:30 (IRDT)

Ab Hajjat-e Chahar Bisheh (Persian: آب حاجت چهار بيشه, also Romanized as Āb Ḩājjat-e Chahār Bīsheh; also known as Ābḩājat) is a village in Lishtar Rural District, in the Central District of Gachsaran County, Kohgiluyeh and Boyer-Ahmad Province, Iran. At the 2006 census, its population was 23, in 4 families.
