= Aru =

Aru or ARU may refer to:

== Education ==
- Alpha Rho Upsilon, a defunct fraternity in the United States
- Anglia Ruskin University, a university in England
- Ardhi University, a Tanzanian public university

== Places ==
- Aru Islands Regency, a group of islands and the regency in the Moluccas
- Aru, Democratic Republic of Congo, a town in Ituri province
- Aru, Harju County, village in Kuusalu Parish, Harju County, Estonia
- Aru, Saare County, village in Saaremaa Parish, Saare County, Estonia
- Aru, Kohgiluyeh and Boyer-Ahmad, village in Gachsaran County, Kohgiluyeh and Boyer-Ahmad Province, Iran
- Aru, Basht, village in Basht County, Kohgiluyeh and Boyer-Ahmad Province, Iran
- Aru, Damavand, village in Damavand County, Tehran Province, Iran
- Aru, Firuzkuh, village in Firuzkuh County, Tehran Province, Iran
- Aru, Jammu and Kashmir, village in India
- Aruba, IOC and UNDP country code ARU

== Sports ==
- Fabio Aru, Italian cyclist
- Army Rugby Union, organizational body for rugby union in the British Army
- Australian Rugby Union, former name of Rugby Australia, governing body for rugby union in Australia

== Technology ==
- Automated response unit, a telecommunications device
- Autonomous Recording Unit, an audio recording device

== People ==
- Ines Aru (born 1939), Estonian actress
- Krista Aru (1958–2025), Estonian historian, museologist and politician
- Peep Aru (born 1953), Estonian politician
- Aru Tateno (born 1997), Japanese ice dancer
- Aru Krishansh Verma (born 1986), Indian actor

== Other uses ==
- American Railway Union, an industrial union in the United States
- Aquarium Rescue Unit, an American jazz-rock band
- Araçatuba Airport, IATA airport code
- Arundel railway station, a railway station in England (National Rail code ARU)
- Aru language (disambiguation)
- Aru Kingdom, an early Islamic polity in northeast Sumatra between the 13th and 16th centuries
