= Nazmakan-e Olya =

Nazmakan-e Olya نازمكان عليا
- Village
- Location within Iran
- Coordinates: 30°38′18″N 50°45′49″E
- Country: Iran
- Province: Kohgiluyeh and Boyer-Ahmad
- County: Gachsaran
- Bakhsh: Central
- Rural District: Boyer Ahmad-e Garmsiri

Population (2006)
  - Total: 103
- Time zone: UTC+3:30 (IRST)
  - Summer (DST): UTC+4:30 (IRDT)

Nazmakan-e Olya (Persian: نازمكان عليا, also Romanized as Nāzmakān-e ‘Olyā; also known as Nazkūn, Nāzmakān, Nāzmakān-e Bālā, Seyyed Jamāl Ed Dīn, and Seyyed Jamāl od Dīn) is a village in Boyer Ahmad-e Garmsiri Rural District, in the Central District of Gachsaran County, Kohgiluyeh and Boyer-Ahmad Province, Iran. At the 2006 census, its population was 103, in 22 families.
