= Ab Tut =

Ab Tut (Persian: اب توت) may refer to:

- Abtut, Fars
- Ab Tut, Kohgiluyeh and Boyer-Ahmad
