= Aru, Kohgiluyeh and Boyer-Ahmad =

Aru ارو
- Village
- Location within Iran
- Coordinates: 30°35′28″N 50°41′27″E
- Country: Iran
- Province: Kohgiluyeh and Boyer-Ahmad
- County: Gachsaran
- Bakhsh: Central
- Rural District: Boyer Ahmad-e Garmsiri

Population (2006)
  - Total: 884
- Time zone: UTC+3:30 (IRST)
  - Summer (DST): UTC+4:30 (IRDT)

Aru (Persian: ارو, also Romanized as Ārū; also known as Kaleh-i-Aru) is a village in Boyer Ahmad-e Garmsiri Rural District, in the Central District of Gachsaran County, Kohgiluyeh and Boyer-Ahmad Province, Iran. At the 2006 census, its population was 884, in 187 families.
