= Gonaveh, Kohgiluyeh and Boyer-Ahmad =

Gonaveh گناوه
- Village
- Location within Iran
- Coordinates: 30°27′14″N 50°50′10″E
- Country: Iran
- Province: Kohgiluyeh and Boyer-Ahmad
- County: Gachsaran
- Bakhsh: Central
- Rural District: Emamzadeh Jafar

Population (2006)
  - Total: 171
- Time zone: UTC+3:30 (IRST)
  - Summer (DST): UTC+4:30 (IRDT)

Gonaveh (Persian: گناوه, also Romanized as Gonāveh, Ganāveh, Ganāweh, and Genāveh) is a village in Emamzadeh Jafar Rural District, in the Central District of Gachsaran County, Kohgiluyeh and Boyer-Ahmad Province, Iran. At the 2006 census, its population was 171, in 43 families.
