= Chahar Bisheh-ye Sofla =

Chahar Bisheh-ye Sofla چهاربيشه سفلي
- Village
- Location within Iran
- Coordinates: 30°25′25″N 50°42′08″E
- Country: Iran
- Province: Kohgiluyeh and Boyer-Ahmad
- County: Gachsaran
- Bakhsh: Central
- Rural District: Lishtar

Population (2006)
  - Total: 326
- Time zone: UTC+3:30 (IRST)
  - Summer (DST): UTC+4:30 (IRDT)

Chahar Bisheh-ye Sofla (Persian: چهاربيشه سفلي, also Romanized as Chahār Bīsheh-ye Soflá; also known as Chahār Bīsheh) is a village in Lishtar Rural District, in the Central District of Gachsaran County, Kohgiluyeh and Boyer-Ahmad Province, Iran. At the 2006 census, its population was 326, in 64 families.
