= Soheyl =

Soheyl (Persian: سهيل) may refer to:

- Soheyl, Isfahan
- Soheyl, Markazi
- Soheyl, Sistan and Baluchestan
