= Anjir Siah, Gachsaran =

Anjir Siah انجيرسياه
- Village
- Location within Iran
- Coordinates: 30°29′51″N 50°37′00″E
- Country: Iran
- Province: Kohgiluyeh and Boyer-Ahmad
- County: Gachsaran
- Bakhsh: Central
- Rural District: Lishtar

Population (2006)
  - Total: 242
- Time zone: UTC+3:30 (IRST)
  - Summer (DST): UTC+4:30 (IRDT)

Anjir Siah (Persian: انجيرسياه, also Romanized as Anjīr Sīāh and Anjīr Seyāh) is a village in Lishtar Rural District, in the Central District of Gachsaran County, Kohgiluyeh and Boyer-Ahmad Province, Iran. At the 2006 census, its population was 242, in 48 families.
