= Benvid =

Benvid or Benavid (Persian: بنويد), also known as Benoyd or Bambiz, may refer to:

- Benvid-e Olya
- Benvid-e Sofla
