= Ali Abad-e Lishtar =

Aliabad-e Lishtar علی آباد ليشتر
- Village
- Location within Iran
- Coordinates: 30°26′03″N 50°31′22″E
- Country: Iran
- Province: Kohgiluyeh and Boyer-Ahmad
- County: Gachsaran
- Bakhsh: Central
- Rural District: Lishtar

Population (2006)
  - Total: 894
- Time zone: UTC+3:30 (IRST)
  - Summer (DST): UTC+4:30 (IRDT)

Aliabad-e Lishtar (Persian: علی آباد ليشتر, also Romanized as Ali Abad-e Līshtar; also known as Aliabad, Līshtar, Līshtar-e ‘Arabhā, Līshtar-e Bālā, and Līshtar Sardār) is a village in Lishtar Rural District, in the Central District of Gachsaran County, Kohgiluyeh and Boyer-Ahmad Province, Iran. At the 1986 census, its population was 664, in 121 families.
