= Ab Tut, Kohgiluyeh and Boyer-Ahmad =

Ab Tut اب توت
- Village
- Location within Iran
- Coordinates: 30°31′39″N 50°39′33″E
- Country: Iran
- Province: Kohgiluyeh and Boyer-Ahmad
- County: Gachsaran
- Bakhsh: Central
- Rural District: Lishtar

Population (2006)
  - Total: 162
- Time zone: UTC+3:30 (IRST)
  - Summer (DST): UTC+4:30 (IRDT)

Ab Tut (Persian: اب توت, also Romanized as Āb Tūt) is a village in Lishtar Rural District, in the Central District of Gachsaran County, Kohgiluyeh and Boyer-Ahmad province, Iran. At the 2006 census, its population was 162, in 37 families.
