= Paduk =

Paduk پادوك
- Village
- Location within Iran
- Coordinates: 30°34′30″N 50°35′09″E
- Country: Iran
- Province: Kohgiluyeh and Boyer-Ahmad
- County: Gachsaran
- Bakhsh: Central
- Rural District: Lishtar

Population (2006)
  - Total: 661
- Time zone: UTC+3:30 (IRST)
  - Summer (DST): UTC+4:30 (IRDT)

Paduk (Persian: پادوك, also Romanized as Pādūk; also known as Dūk and Pāydūk) is a village in Lishtar Rural District, in the Central District of Gachsaran County, Kohgiluyeh and Boyer-Ahmad Province, Iran. At the 2006 census, its population was 661, in 150 families.
