= Ab Anjir-e Sofla =

Ab Anjir-e Sofla اب انجيرسفلي
- Village
- Location within Iran
- Coordinates: 30°27′14″N 50°27′33″E
- Country: Iran
- Province: Kohgiluyeh and Boyer-Ahmad
- County: Gachsaran
- Bakhsh: Central
- Rural District: Lishtar

Population (2006)
  - Total: 98
- Time zone: UTC+3:30 (IRST)
  - Summer (DST): UTC+4:30 (IRDT)

Ab Anjir-e Sofla (Persian: اب انجيرسفلي, also Romaninized as Āb Anjīr-e Soflá; also known as Āb Anjīr-e Pā’īn) is a village in Lishtar Rural District, in the Central District of Gachsaran County, Kohgiluyeh and Boyer-Ahmad province, Iran. At the 2006 census, its population was 98, in 23 families.
