= Saadatabad-e Lishtar =

Saadatabad-e Lishtar سعادت اباد ليشتر
- Village
- Location within Iran
- Coordinates: 30°25′10″N 50°38′48″E
- Country: Iran
- Province: Kohgiluyeh and Boyer-Ahmad
- County: Gachsaran
- Bakhsh: Central
- Rural District: Lishtar

Population (2006)
  - Total: 277
- Time zone: UTC+3:30 (IRST)
  - Summer (DST): UTC+4:30 (IRDT)

Saadatabad-e Lishtar (Persian: سعادت اباد ليشتر, also Romanized as Sa‘ādatābād-e Līshtar; also known as Sa‘ādatābād) is a village in Lishtar Rural District, in the Central District of Gachsaran County, Kohgiluyeh and Boyer-Ahmad Province, Iran. At the 2006 census, its population was 277, in 70 families.
