= Dil, Iran =

Village in Kohgiluyeh and Boyer-Ahmad province, Iran

Dil Persian: ديل
- Village
- Location within Iran
- Coordinates: 30°33′07″N 50°45′30″E
- Country: Iran
- Province: Kohgiluyeh and Boyer-Ahmad
- County: Gachsaran
- District: Central
- Rural District: Boyer Ahmad-e Garmsiri

Population (2016)
  - Total: 1,768
- Time zone: UTC+3:30 (IRST)

Dil (Persian: ديل) (Note: Also romanized as Dīl) is a village in, and the capital of, Boyer Ahmad-e Garmsiri Rural District of the Central District of Gachsaran County, Kohgiluyeh and Boyer-Ahmad province, Iran.

== Demographics ==
=== Population ===
At the time of the 2006 National Census, the village's population was 2,087 in 482 households. The following census in 2011 counted 1,938 people in 554 households. The 2016 census measured the population of the village as 1,768 people in 531 households. It was the most populous village in its rural district.
