= Sadatabad-e Lishtar =

Sadatabad-e Lishtar سادات اباد ليشتر
- Village
- Location within Iran
- Coordinates: 30°24′23″N 50°37′25″E
- Country: Iran
- Province: Kohgiluyeh and Boyer-Ahmad
- County: Gachsaran
- Bakhsh: Central
- Rural District: Lishtar

Population (2006)
  - Total: 116
- Time zone: UTC+3:30 (IRST)
  - Summer (DST): UTC+4:30 (IRDT)

Sadatabad-e Lishtar (Persian: سادات اباد ليشتر, also Romanized as Sādātābād-e Līshtar; also known as Sādāt) is a village in Lishtar Rural District, in the Central District of Gachsaran County, Kohgiluyeh and Boyer-Ahmad Province, Iran. At the 2006 census, its population was 116, in 25 families.
