= Esper, Iran =

Aspar اسپر
- Village
- Location within Iran
- Coordinates: 30°36′01″N 50°44′49″E
- Country: Iran
- Province: Kohgiluyeh and Boyer-Ahmad
- County: Gachsaran
- Bakhsh: Central
- Rural District: Boyer Ahmad-e Garmsiri

Population (2006)
  - Total: 218
- Time zone: UTC+3:30 (IRST)
  - Summer (DST): UTC+4:30 (IRDT)

Aspar (Persian: اسپر) is a village in Boyer Ahmad-e Garmsiri Rural District, in the Central District of Gachsaran County, Kohgiluyeh and Boyer-Ahmad Province, Iran. At the 2006 census, its population was 218, in 50 families.
