= Pakuh, Kohgiluyeh and Boyer-Ahmad =

Pakuh پاكوه
- Village
- Location within Iran
- Coordinates: 30°15′11″N 51°04′53″E
- Country: Iran
- Province: Kohgiluyeh and Boyer-Ahmad
- County: Gachsaran
- Bakhsh: Central
- Rural District: Emamzadeh Jafar

Population (2006)
  - Total: 176
- Time zone: UTC+3:30 (IRST)
  - Summer (DST): UTC+4:30 (IRDT)

Pakuh (Persian: پاكوه, also Romanized as Pākūh) is a village in Emamzadeh Jafar Rural District, in the Central District of Gachsaran County, Kohgiluyeh and Boyer-Ahmad Province, Iran. At the 2006 census, its population was 176, in 36 families.
