= Ab Garmu, Kohgiluyeh and Boyer-Ahmad =

Village in Kohgiluyeh and Boyer-Ahmad province, Iran

Ab Garmu Persian: اب گرمو
- Village
- Location within Iran
- Coordinates: 30°22′50″N 50°46′34″E
- Country: Iran
- Province: Kohgiluyeh and Boyer-Ahmad
- County: Gachsaran
- District: Central
- Rural District: Emamzadeh Jafar

Population (2016)
  - Total: 1,816
- Time zone: UTC+3:30 (IRST)

Ab Garmu (Persian: اب گرمو) (Note: Also romanized as Āb Garmū) is a village in Emamzadeh Jafar Rural District of the Central District of Gachsaran County, Kohgiluyeh and Boyer-Ahmad province, Iran.

== Demographics ==
=== Population ===
At the time of the 2006 National Census, the village's population was 1,404 in 293 households. The following census in 2011 counted 1,534 people in 397 households. The 2016 census measured the population of the village as 1,816 people in 488 households. It was the most populous village in its rural district.
