= Emamzadeh Jafar, Kohgiluyeh and Boyer-Ahmad =

Village in Kohgiluyeh and Boyer-Ahmad province, Iran

Emamzadeh Jafar Persian: امامزاده جعفر
- Village
- Location within Iran
- Coordinates: 30°18′39″N 50°58′23″E
- Country: Iran
- Province: Kohgiluyeh and Boyer-Ahmad
- County: Gachsaran
- District: Central
- Rural District: Emamzadeh Jafar

Population (2016)
  - Total: 502
- Time zone: UTC+3:30 (IRST)

Emamzadeh Jafar (Persian: امامزاده جعفر) (Note: Also romanized as Emāmzādeh Ja‘far) is a village in, and the capital of, Emamzadeh Jafar Rural District of the Central District of Gachsaran County, Kohgiluyeh and Boyer-Ahmad province, Iran.

== Demographics ==
=== Population ===
At the time of the 2006 National Census, the village's population was 1,890 in 382 households. The following census in 2011 counted 401 people in 88 households. The 2016 census measured the population of the village as 502 people in 144 households.
