= Nazmakan =

Nazmakan (Persian: نازمكان) may refer to:

- Nazmakan-e Olya
- Nazmakan-e Sofla
