= Baba Kalan =

Village in Kohgiluyeh and Boyer-Ahmad province, Iran

Baba Kalan Persian: باباكلان
- Village
- Location within Iran
- Coordinates: 30°06′45″N 50°49′14″E
- Country: Iran
- Province: Kohgiluyeh and Boyer-Ahmad
- County: Gachsaran
- District: Central
- Rural District: Bibi Hakimeh

Population (2016)
  - Total: 1,100
- Time zone: UTC+3:30 (IRST)

Baba Kalan (Persian: باباكلان) (Note: Also romanized as Bābā Kalān and Bābā-ye Kalān; also known as Bābā Kalū, Bāba Keln, Bāba Kelu, Chashmeh-ye Bābā Kālān, Cheshmeh-ye Bābā Kalān, and Cheshmey-ye Bābā Kalān) is a village in, and the capital of, Bibi Hakimeh Rural District of the Central District of Gachsaran County, Kohgiluyeh and Boyer-Ahmad province, Iran.

== Demographics ==
=== Population ===
At the time of the 2006 National Census, the village's population was 1,431 in 320 households. The following census in 2011 counted 1,411 people in 368 households. The 2016 census measured the population of the village as 1,100 people in 307 households. It was the most populous village in its rural district.
