= Rudbal, Kohgiluyeh and Boyer-Ahmad =

Rudbal رودبال
- Village
- Location within Iran
- Coordinates: 30°38′01″N 50°47′26″E
- Country: Iran
- Province: Kohgiluyeh and Boyer-Ahmad
- County: Gachsaran
- Bakhsh: Central
- Rural District: Boyer Ahmad-e Garmsiri

Population (2006)
  - Total: 50
- Time zone: UTC+3:30 (IRST)
  - Summer (DST): UTC+4:30 (IRDT)

Rudbal (Persian: رودبال, also Romanized as Rūdbāl) is a village in Boyer Ahmad-e Garmsiri Rural District, in the Central District of Gachsaran County, Kohgiluyeh and Boyer-Ahmad Province, Iran. At the 2006 census, its population was 50, in 18 families.
