= Ab Anjir-e Olya =

Ab Anjir-e Olya اب انجيرعليا
- Village
- Location within Iran Location within Middle East
- Coordinates: 30°27′51″N 50°27′59″E
- Country: Iran
- Province: Kohgiluyeh and Boyer-Ahmad
- County: Gachsaran
- Bakhsh: Central
- Rural District: Lishtar

Population (2006)
  - Total: 109
- Time zone: UTC+3:30 (IRST)
  - Summer (DST): UTC+4:30 (IRDT)

Ab Anjir-e Olya (Persian: اب انجيرعليا, also Romanized as Āb Anjīr-e 'Olyā; also known as Āb Anjīr-e Bālā) is a village in Lishtar Rural District, in the Central District of Gachsaran County, Kohgiluyeh and Boyer-Ahmad province, Iran. At the 2006 census, its population was 109, in 28 families.
