= Nazmakan-e Sofla =

Nazmakan-e Sofla نازمكان سفلي
- Village
- Location within Iran
- Coordinates: 30°38′21″N 50°44′43″E
- Country: Iran
- Province: Kohgiluyeh and Boyer-Ahmad
- County: Gachsaran
- Bakhsh: Central
- Rural District: Boyer Ahmad-e Garmsiri

Population (2006)
  - Total: 157
- Time zone: UTC+3:30 (IRST)
  - Summer (DST): UTC+4:30 (IRDT)

Nazmakan-e Sofla (Persian: نازمكان سفلي, also Romanized as Nāzmakān-e Soflá; also known as Nāzmakān and Nāzmakān-e Pā’īn) is a village in Boyer Ahmad-e Garmsiri Rural District, in the Central District of Gachsaran County, Kohgiluyeh and Boyer-Ahmad Province, Iran. At the 2006 census, its population was 157, in 31 families.
