= Rudbal =

Rudbal or Rud Bal (Persian: رودبال) may refer to:

- Rudbal, Firuzabad, Fars Province
- Rudbal, Sepidan, Fars Province
- Rudbal, Kohgiluyeh and Boyer-Ahmad
- Rudbal Rural District, in Fars Province
