= Paduk (disambiguation) =

Paduk is a village in Kohgiluyeh and Boyer-Ahmad Province, Iran.

Paduk may also refer to:

- Korean name for Go (game)
- an alternate name for Padauk, the wood from several species of Pterocarpus
- Paduka, traditional Indian footwear
