= Chahar Bisheh-ye Olya =

Village in Kohgiluyeh and Boyer-Ahmad province, Iran

Chahar Bisheh-ye Olya Persian: چهاربيشه عليا
- Village
- Location within Iran
- Coordinates: 30°23′27″N 50°43′49″E
- Country: Iran
- Province: Kohgiluyeh and Boyer-Ahmad
- County: Gachsaran
- District: Central
- Rural District: Lishtar

Population (2016)
  - Total: 1,816
- Time zone: UTC+3:30 (IRST)

Chahar Bisheh-ye Olya (Persian: چهاربيشه عليا) (Note: Also romanized as Chahar Bīsheh-ye ‘Olyā; also known as Chaha, Chahak, and Chaheh) is a village in Lishtar Rural District of the Central District of Gachsaran County, Kohgiluyeh and Boyer-Ahmad province, Iran.

== Demographics ==
=== Population ===
At the time of the 2006 National Census, the village's population was 852 in 175 households. The following census in 2011 counted 1,359 people in 326 households. The 2016 census measured the population of the village as 1,816 people in 462 households. It was the most populous village in its rural district.
