= Jannābī =

Jannābī or Al-Jannābī (Arabic: الجنّابی, meaning from Genaveh) may refer to the following:

- Abu Sa'id al-Jannabi, founder of the Qarmati state in Bahrain and Ahsa
- Abū-Tāhir Jannābī, son of Abū-Saʿīd Jannābī
- Jannabi (band), a South Korean indie rock duo
