= Esper =

Esper or Espers may refer to:

== Arts and entertainment ==
- Espers (band), a Philadelphia-based folk group
  - Espers (album), their eponymous debut album
- Espers (comics), a series of comics written by James D. Hudnall and published by Eclipse Comics
- Esper (Final Fantasy), a type of mystical being in a number of the Final Fantasy video games
- "Esper", a song by Japanese heavy metal band Loudness from the 1984 album Disillusion
- Esper, one of five fictional shards in the Alara block expansion for Magic: The Gathering

== Other uses ==
- Esper, Iran, a village in Kohgiluyeh and Boyer-Ahmad Province, Iran
- Esper Bionics, a Ukrainian manufacturer of prosthetics
- Esper, Missouri, a community in the United States
- Esper (name), a list of people with the surname
- Esper (software), a software product for complex event processing
- ESPer, person who has extrasensory perception

== See also ==
- Vespers (disambiguation)
