= Ganaveh =

Ganaveh or Gonaveh or Ganaweh or Genaveh (Persian: گناوه) may refer to:

- Bandar Ganaveh, a city in Bushehr Province
- Ganaveh, Deyr, a village in Bushehr Province
- Ganaveh County, in Bushehr Province
- Gonaveh, Kohgiluyeh and Boyer-Ahmad
- Ganaveh, Lorestan
