= Esrey =

Esrey is a surname. Notable people with the surname include:

- David Reese Esrey (1825–1898), American businessman and banker
- William Esrey (born 1940), American businessman

== See also ==
- Espey
- Estey (surname)
