= Eslamabad-e Lishtar =

Village in Kohgiluyeh and Boyer-Ahmad province, Iran

Eslamabad-e Lishtar Persian: اسلام اباد ليشتر
- Village
- Location within Iran
- Coordinates: 30°26′03″N 50°31′22″E
- Country: Iran
- Province: Kohgiluyeh and Boyer-Ahmad
- County: Gachsaran
- District: Central
- Rural District: Lishtar

Population (2016)
  - Total: 746
- Time zone: UTC+3:30 (IRST)

Eslamabad-e Lishtar (Persian: اسلام اباد ليشتر) (Note: Also romanized as Eslāmābād-e Līshtar; also known as Eslāmābād, Līshtar, Līshtar-e ‘Arabhā, Līshtar-e Bālā, and Līshtar Sardār) is a village in, and the capital of, Lishtar Rural District of the Central District of Gachsaran County, Kohgiluyeh and Boyer-Ahmad province, Iran.

== Demographics ==
=== Population ===
At the time of the 2006 National Census, the village's population was 894 in 172 households. The following census in 2011 counted 778 people in 195 households. The 2016 census measured the population of the village as 746 people in 209 households.
