= Separ =

Separ may refer to:

- Separ, New Mexico, an unincorporated community and ghost town in the United States
- Separ, Iran, a village
- IRIS Separ (P234), fast attack craft of Iran navy
- Vepar, a demon listed in Ars Goetia
- Separ (rapper), rapper from Slovakia
- SEPAR, a form of mass spectrometry, see Surface-enhanced laser desorption/ionization
