= Espey =

Espey is a surname. Notable people with the surname include:

- James Espey (born 1984), Irish sailor
- John Espey (1913–2000), novelist, memoirist and literary scholar
- Rich Espey, American playwright

== See also ==
- Esper (name)
