= Bafran =

City in Isfahan province, Iran

Bafran Persian: باقران
- City
- Location within Iran
- Coordinates: 32°50′17″N 53°08′19″E
- Country: Iran
- Province: Isfahan
- County: Nain
- District: Central
- Established as a city: 2008

Population (2016)
  - Total: 1,978
- Time zone: UTC+3:30 (IRST)

Bafran (Persian: باقران) (Note: Also romanized as Bāfarān and Bāfrān; also known as Bāfrān Minar) is a city in the Central District of Nain County, Isfahan province, Iran, serving as the administrative center for Bafran Rural District.

== Demographics ==
=== Population ===
At the time of the 2006 National Census, Bafran's population was 2,138 in 590 households, when it was a village in Bafran Rural District. The following census in 2011 counted 2,027 people in 656 households, by which time the village had been converted to a city. The 2016 census measured the population of the city as 1,978 people in 688 households.
