= Hendu Chub =

Village in Isfahan province, Iran

Hendu Chub Persian: هندوچوب
- Village
- Location within Iran
- Coordinates: 32°43′06″N 53°08′01″E
- Country: Iran
- Province: Isfahan
- County: Nain
- District: Central
- Rural District: Bafran

Population (2016)
  - Total: 65
- Time zone: UTC+3:30 (IRST)

Hendu Chub (Persian: هندوچوب) (Note: Also romanized as Hendū Chūb; also known as Hend Choob, Hend Chūb, 'Hendeh Chūb, Hendehchū, Hondah Chū’īyeh, and Hund Chūb) is a village in Bafran Rural District of the Central District in Nain County, Isfahan province, Iran.

== Demographics ==
=== Population ===
At the time of the 2006 National Census, the village's population was 48 in 18 households. The following census in 2011 counted 65 people in 30 households. The 2016 census measured the population of the village as 65 people in 31 households.
