= Bafran Rural District =

Rural district in Isfahan province, Iran

Bafran Rural District Persian: دهستان باقران
- Rural District
- Location within Iran
- Coordinates: 32°56′N 53°17′E
- Country: Iran
- Province: Isfahan
- County: Nain
- District: Central
- Established: 1987
- Capital: Bafran

Population (2016)
  - Total: 1,483
- Time zone: UTC+3:30 (IRST)

Bafran Rural District (Persian: دهستان باقران) is in the Central District of Nain County, Isfahan province, Iran. It is administered from the city of Bafran.

== Demographics ==
=== Population ===
At the time of the 2006 National Census, the rural district's population was 3,603 in 1,081 households. There were 1,782 inhabitants in 652 households at the following census of 2011. The 2016 census measured the population of the rural district as 1,483 in 551 households. The most populous of its 27 villages was Mazraeh Emam, with 1,074 people.

=== Other villages in the rural district ===
- Benvid-e Olya
- Benvid-e Sofla
- Hendu Chub
- Kalut-e Mohammadiyeh
- Separu
- Soheyl
