= Kalut-e Mohammadiyeh =

Village in Isfahan province, Iran

Kalut-e Mohammadiyeh Persian: كلوت محمديه
- Village
- Country: Iran
- Province: Isfahan
- County: Nain
- District: Central
- Rural District: Bafran

Population (2016)
  - Total: 0
- Time zone: UTC+3:30 (IRST)

Kalut-e Mohammadiyeh (Persian: كلوت محمديه) (Note: Also romanized as Kalūt-e Moḩammadīyeh) is a village in Bafran Rural District of the Central District in Nain County, Isfahan province, Iran.

== Demographics ==
=== Population ===
At the time of the 2006 National Census, the village's population was 54 in 36 households. The following census in 2011 counted 14 people in five households. The 2016 census measured the population of the village as zero.
