= Esper (name) =

Esper is a surname and given name. Notable people with the surname include:

== Surname ==
- Esper (surname)

== Given name ==
- Esper Beloselsky (1871–1921), Russian prince, sailor, and Olympic medalist
- Esper Ukhtomsky (1861–1921), Russian prince, diplomat, poet, publisher, and Orientalist

== See also ==
- Esper (disambiguation)
