= Dogonbadan =

City in Kohgiluyeh and Boyer-Ahmad province, Iran

Dogonbadan Persian: دوگنبدان
- City
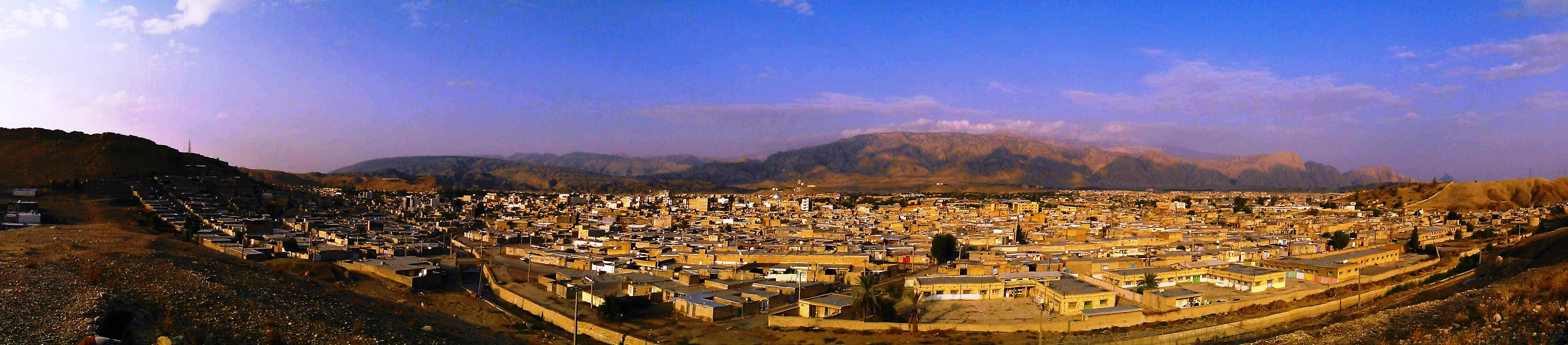
- Panorama of Dogonbadan (Gachsaran) city

- Location within Iran
- Coordinates: 30°21′36″N 50°47′02″E
- Country: Iran
- Province: Kohgiluyeh and Boyer-Ahmad
- County: Gachsaran
- District: Central

Population (2016)
  - Total: 96,728
- Time zone: UTC+3:30 (IRST)

Dogonbadan (Persian: دوگنبدان; Persian pronunciation: [dɔəgɔənbadɒːn]) (Note: Also romanized as Do Gonbadān and Dow Gonbadān; also known as Du Gunbadān and Gachsaran (گچساران), also romanized as Gachsārān) is a city in the Central District of Gachsaran County, Kohgiluyeh and Boyer-Ahmad province, Iran, serving as capital of both the county and the district.

== Demographics ==
=== Population ===
At the time of the 2006 National Census, the city's population was 81,902 in 18,264 households. The following census in 2011 counted 91,739 people in 23,254 households. The 2016 census measured the population of the city as 96,728 people in 26,770 households.

== Climate ==
Dogonbadan has a hot semi-arid climate (Köppen BSh) bordering on a hot-summer Mediterranean climate (Csa). Dogonbadan’s proximity to the hot Persian Gulf makes its climate closer to Mesopotamia or coastal cities like Bushehr than to most of Kohgiluyeh and Boyer-Ahmad province. The city features sweltering and arid summers contrasting with pleasant and fairly wet winters.

Climate data for Dogonbadan (1991–2020)
| Month | Jan | Feb | Mar | Apr | May | Jun | Jul | Aug | Sep | Oct | Nov | Dec | Year |
|---|---|---|---|---|---|---|---|---|---|---|---|---|---|
| Record high °C (°F) | 27.7 (81.9) | 29.5 (85.1) | 36.8 (98.2) | 38.8 (101.8) | 44.6 (112.3) | 47.6 (117.7) | 48.6 (119.5) | 48.8 (119.8) | 45.6 (114.1) | 41.9 (107.4) | 32.8 (91.0) | 30.6 (87.1) | 48.8 (119.8) |
| Mean daily maximum °C (°F) | 16.6 (61.9) | 18.7 (65.7) | 22.9 (73.2) | 29.0 (84.2) | 36.1 (97.0) | 41.1 (106.0) | 42.6 (108.7) | 42.4 (108.3) | 39.0 (102.2) | 33.1 (91.6) | 24.2 (75.6) | 19.2 (66.6) | 30.4 (86.7) |
| Daily mean °C (°F) | 10.4 (50.7) | 12.3 (54.1) | 16.0 (60.8) | 21.8 (71.2) | 28.9 (84.0) | 33.4 (92.1) | 35.1 (95.2) | 34.5 (94.1) | 30.7 (87.3) | 25.0 (77.0) | 17.0 (62.6) | 12.3 (54.1) | 23.1 (73.6) |
| Mean daily minimum °C (°F) | 5.2 (41.4) | 6.5 (43.7) | 9.2 (48.6) | 14.0 (57.2) | 19.8 (67.6) | 23.3 (73.9) | 26.0 (78.8) | 25.5 (77.9) | 21.5 (70.7) | 16.5 (61.7) | 10.7 (51.3) | 6.7 (44.1) | 15.4 (59.7) |
| Record low °C (°F) | −9.0 (15.8) | −2.9 (26.8) | −1.0 (30.2) | 4.2 (39.6) | 10.6 (51.1) | 16.0 (60.8) | 16.6 (61.9) | 16.0 (60.8) | 13.6 (56.5) | 8.0 (46.4) | 0.0 (32.0) | −4.6 (23.7) | −9.0 (15.8) |
| Average precipitation mm (inches) | 102.1 (4.02) | 55.6 (2.19) | 62.9 (2.48) | 26.1 (1.03) | 5.7 (0.22) | 0.3 (0.01) | 0.2 (0.01) | 3.9 (0.15) | 1.6 (0.06) | 8.1 (0.32) | 74.2 (2.92) | 101.8 (4.01) | 442.5 (17.42) |
| Average precipitation days (≥ 1.0 mm) | 6.9 | 5.2 | 5.1 | 3.3 | 0.8 | 0.1 | 0.1 | 0.6 | 0.4 | 1.2 | 4.3 | 5.7 | 33.7 |
| Average relative humidity (%) | 68.0 | 61.0 | 52.0 | 41.0 | 23.0 | 16.0 | 19.0 | 22.0 | 24.0 | 30.0 | 51.0 | 65.0 | 39.3 |
| Average dew point °C (°F) | 3.7 (38.7) | 3.9 (39.0) | 4.4 (39.9) | 5.7 (42.3) | 3.5 (38.3) | 2.3 (36.1) | 6.1 (43.0) | 7.5 (45.5) | 5.1 (41.2) | 4.2 (39.6) | 4.9 (40.8) | 4.5 (40.1) | 4.7 (40.5) |
| Mean monthly sunshine hours | 194.0 | 194.0 | 231.0 | 242.0 | 313.0 | 351.0 | 338.0 | 334.0 | 311.0 | 289.0 | 218.0 | 207.0 | 3,222 |
Source: NOAA

== Economy ==
Dogonbadan is an oil- and gas-producing city that has just started to expand and profits from its industrial capacity. The city has the largest gas reserves in Iran as well as the largest recoverable oil field in Iran and the third largest in the world.

== Gallery ==
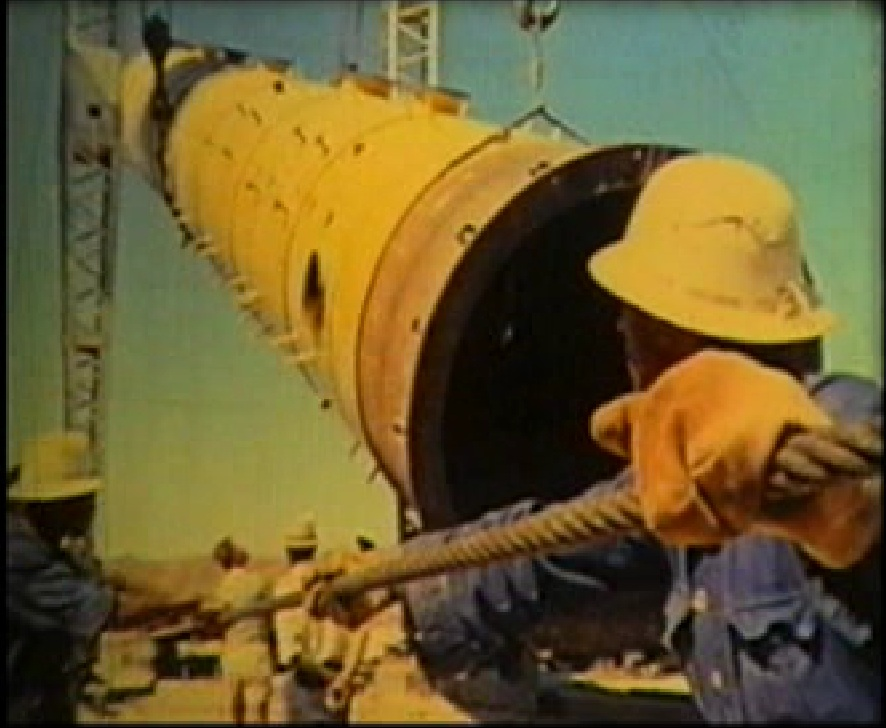
British staffs of an oil company in Gachsaran in 1957

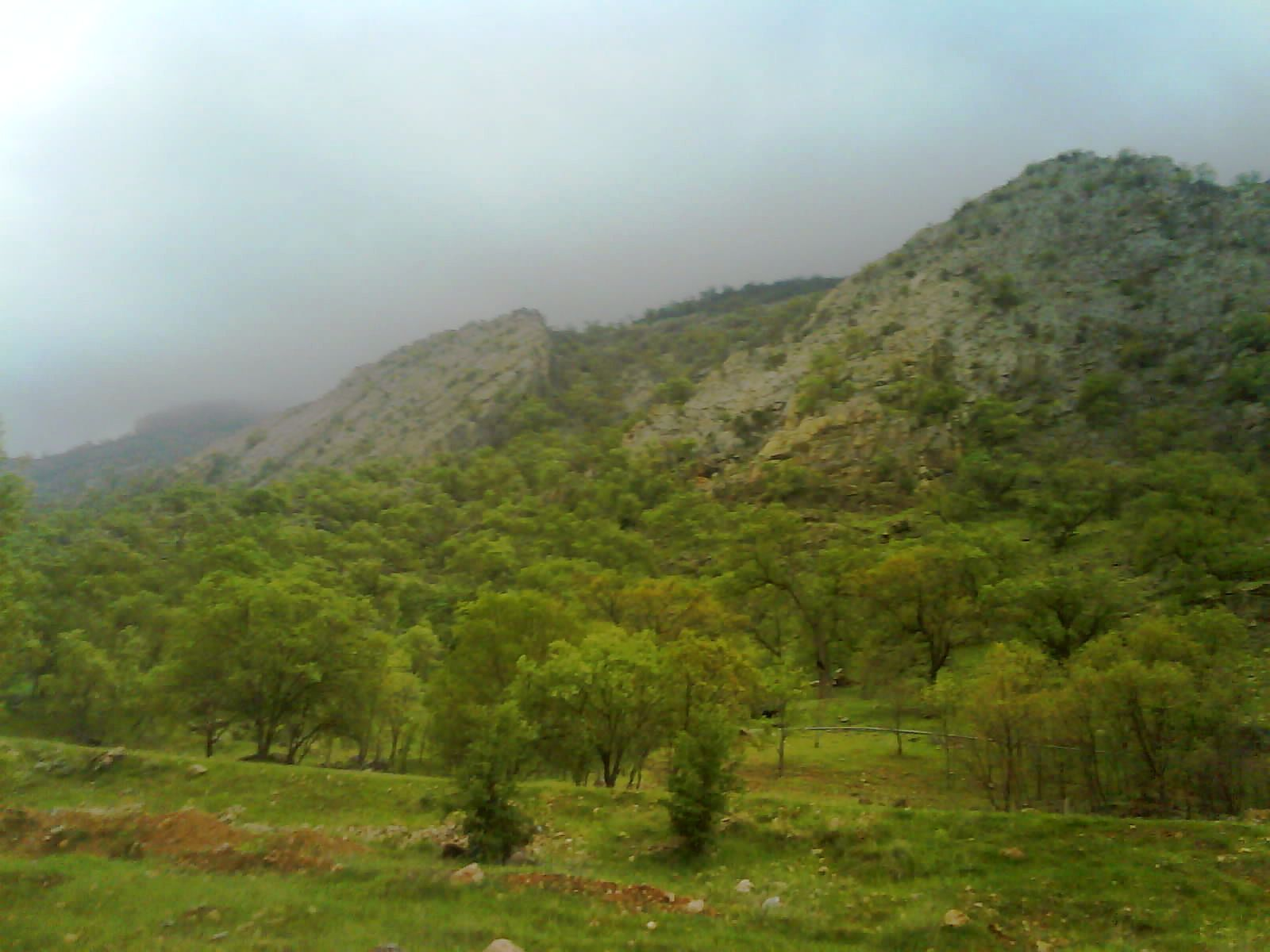
Tange deel around the Gachsaran city, Early spring

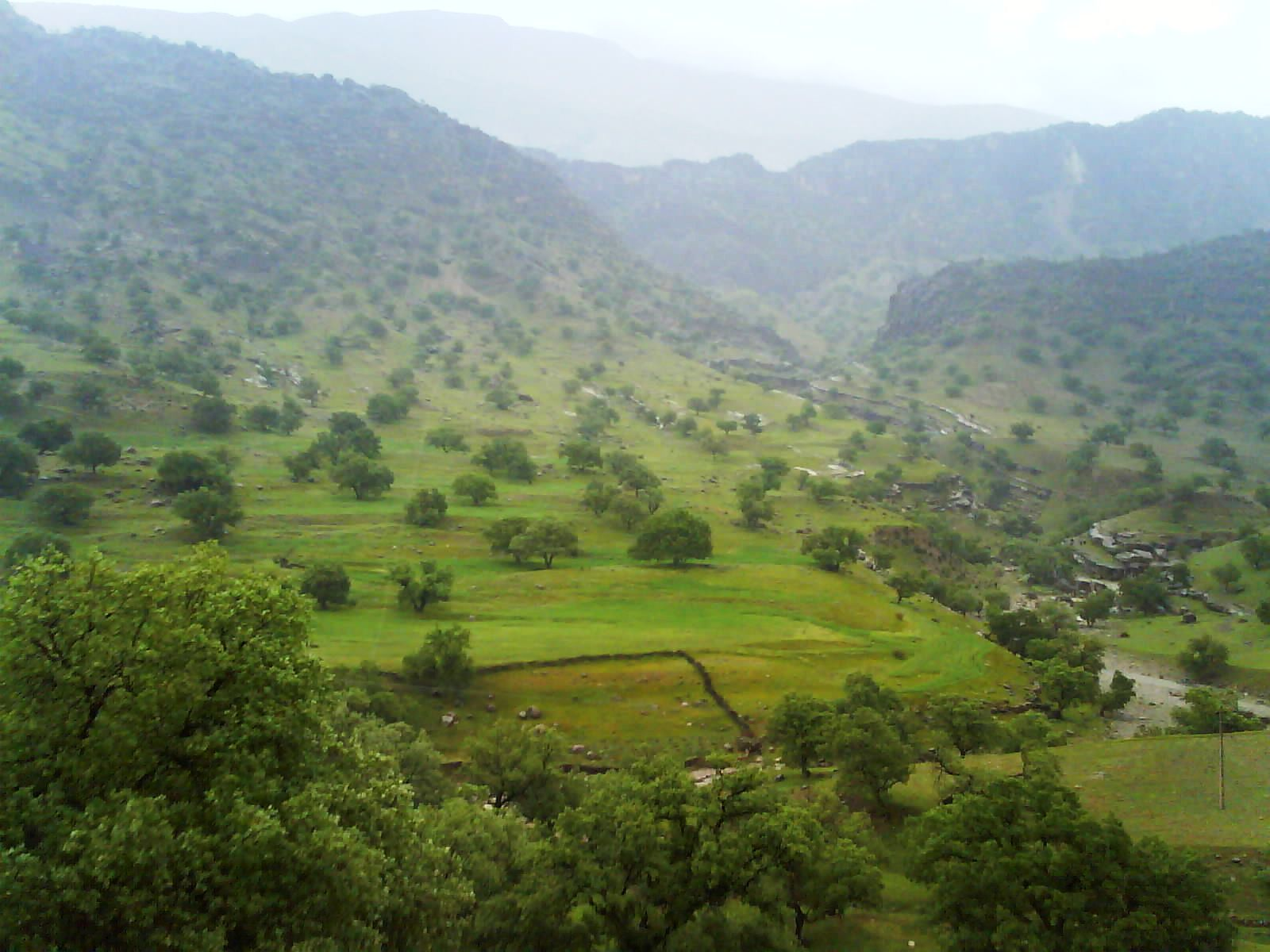
Barabar around the Gachsaran city, Early spring

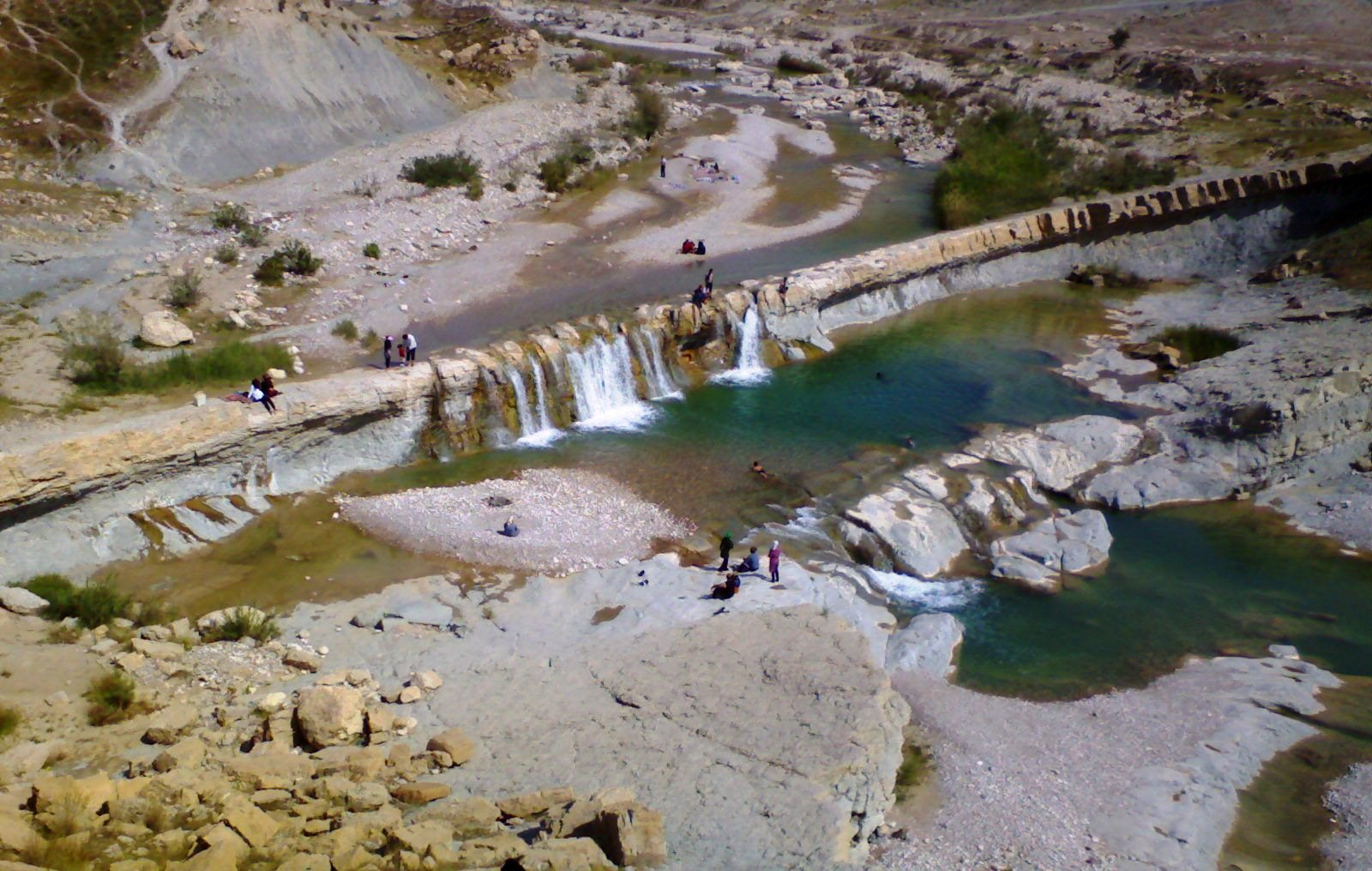
Kayvan fall around Dogonbadan(Gachsaran)

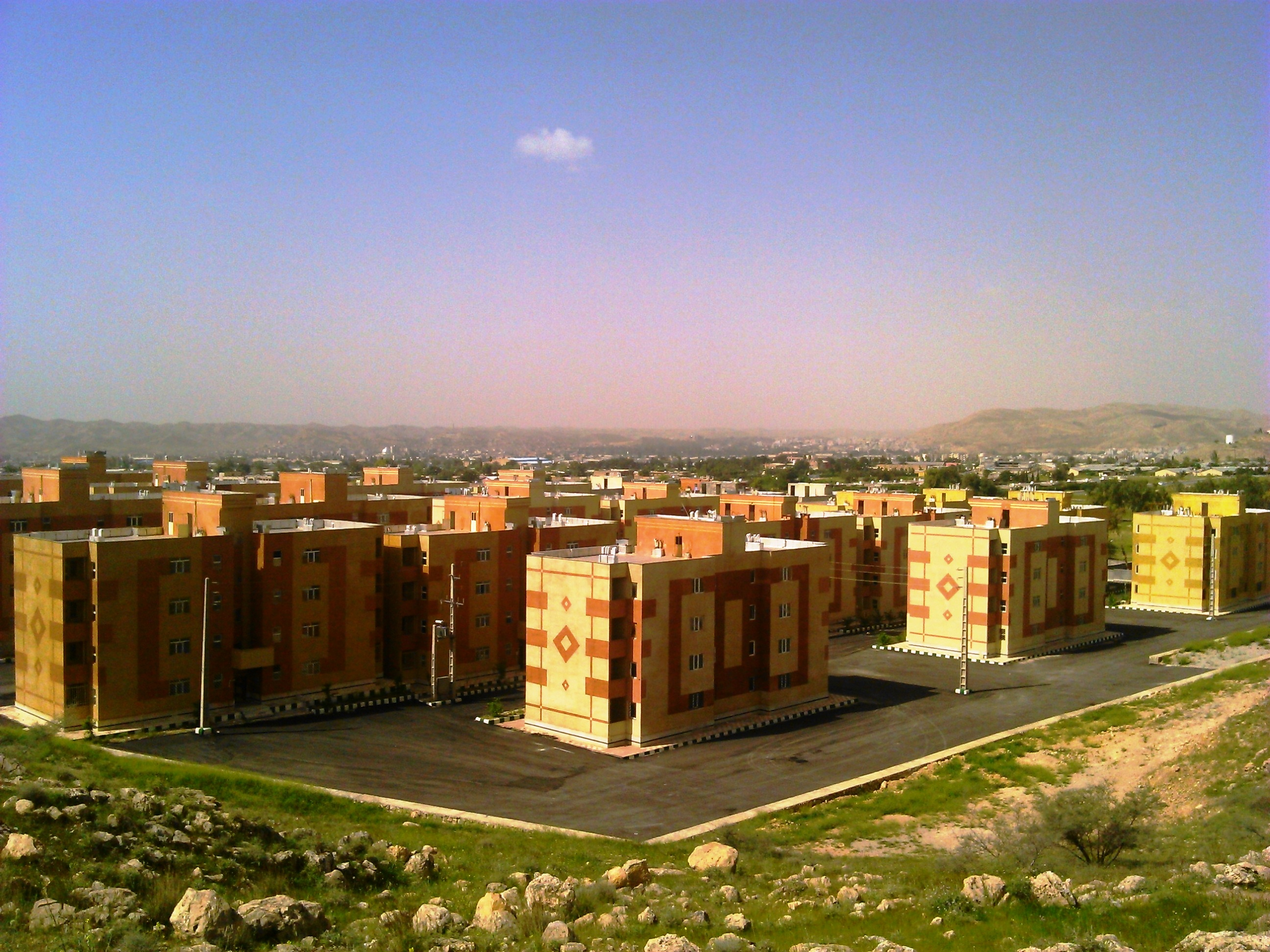

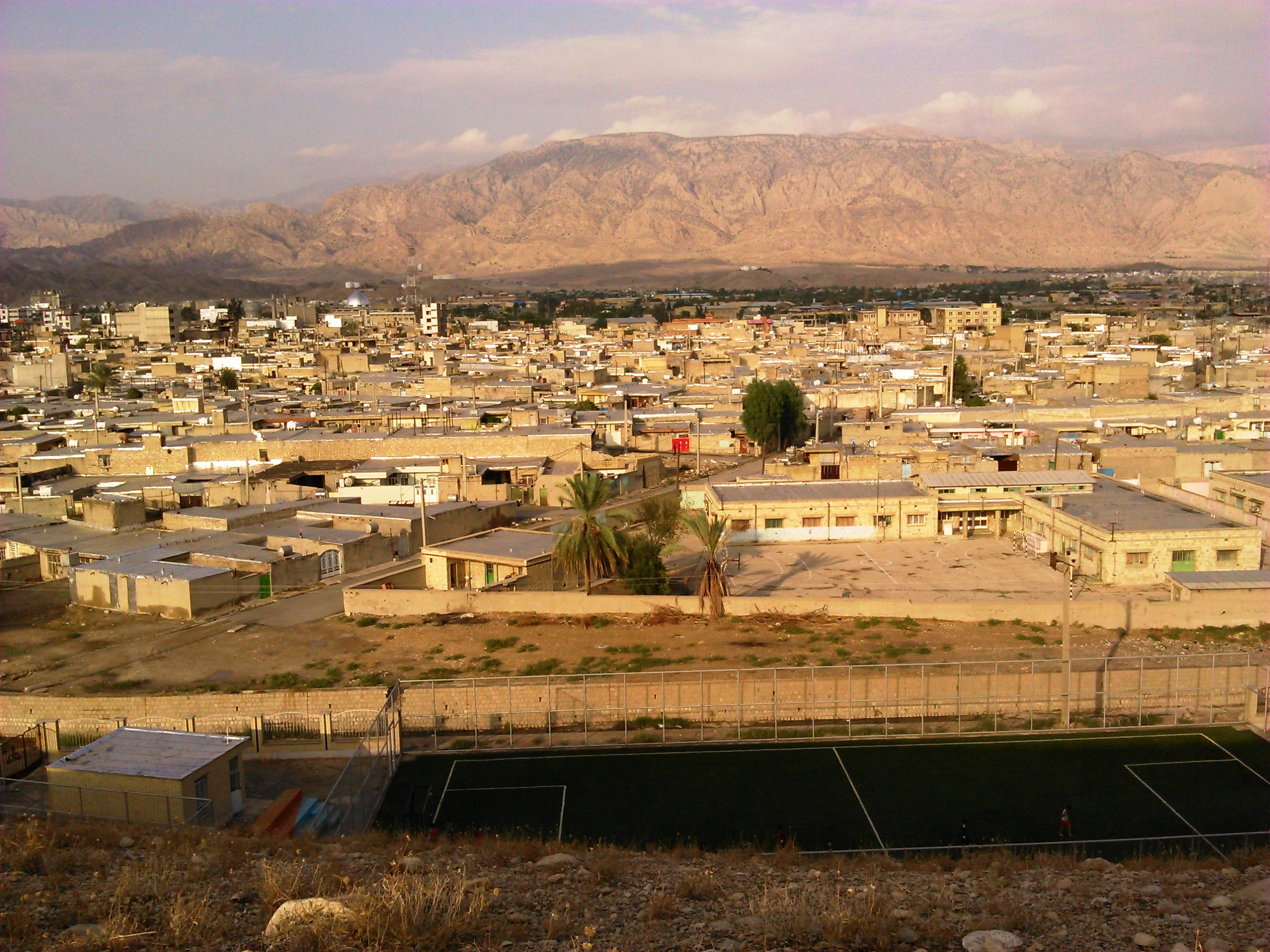

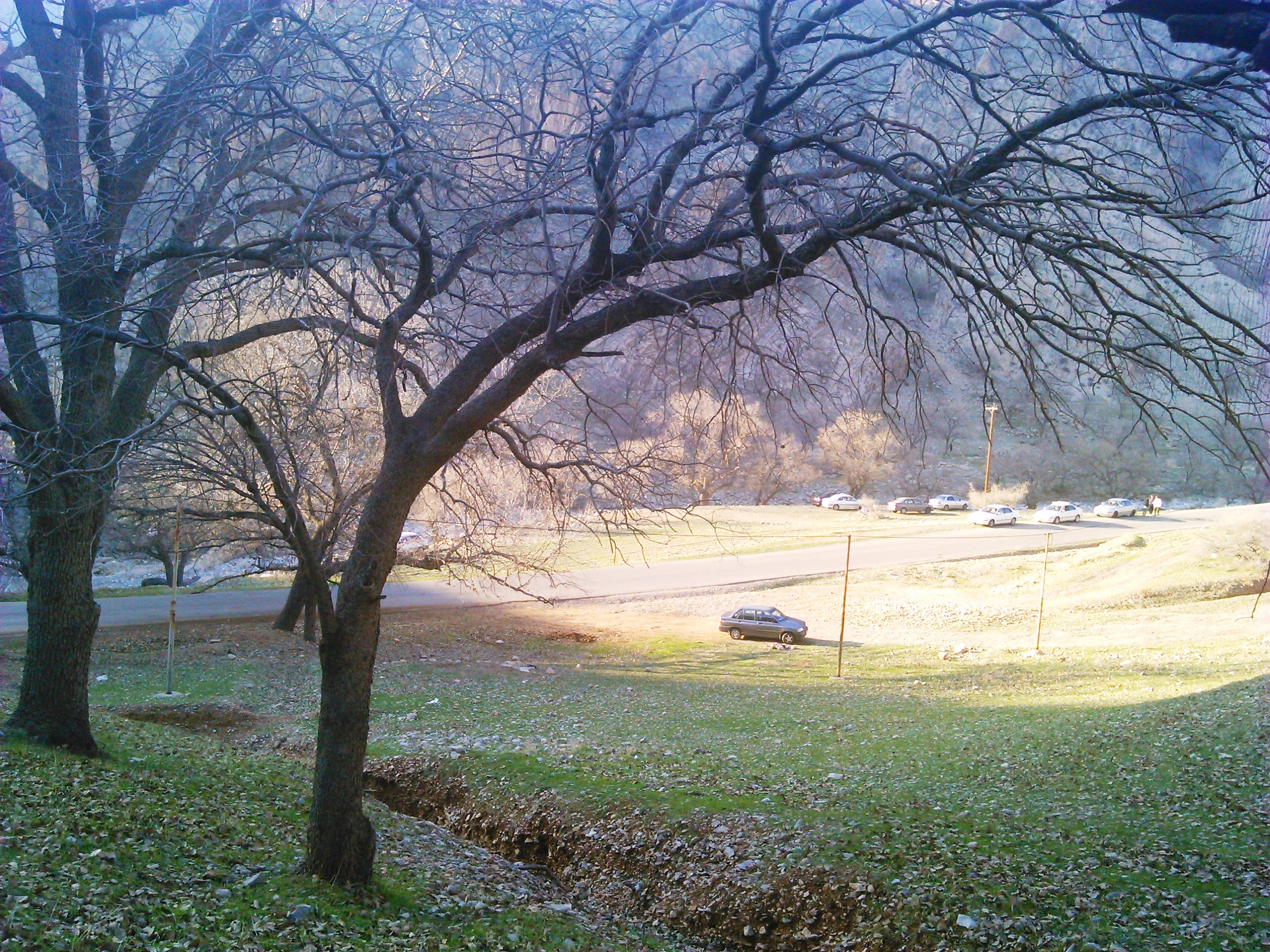

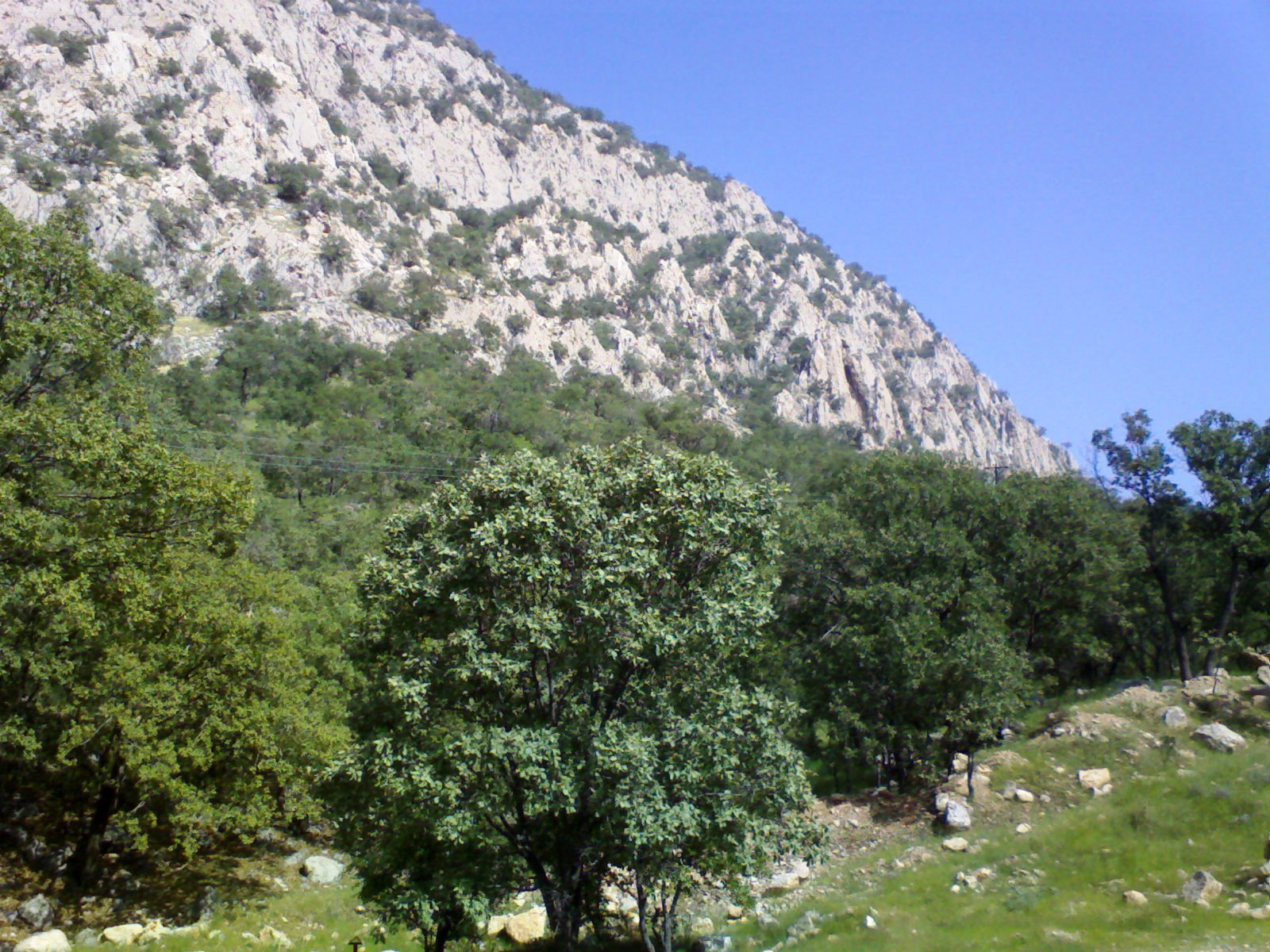

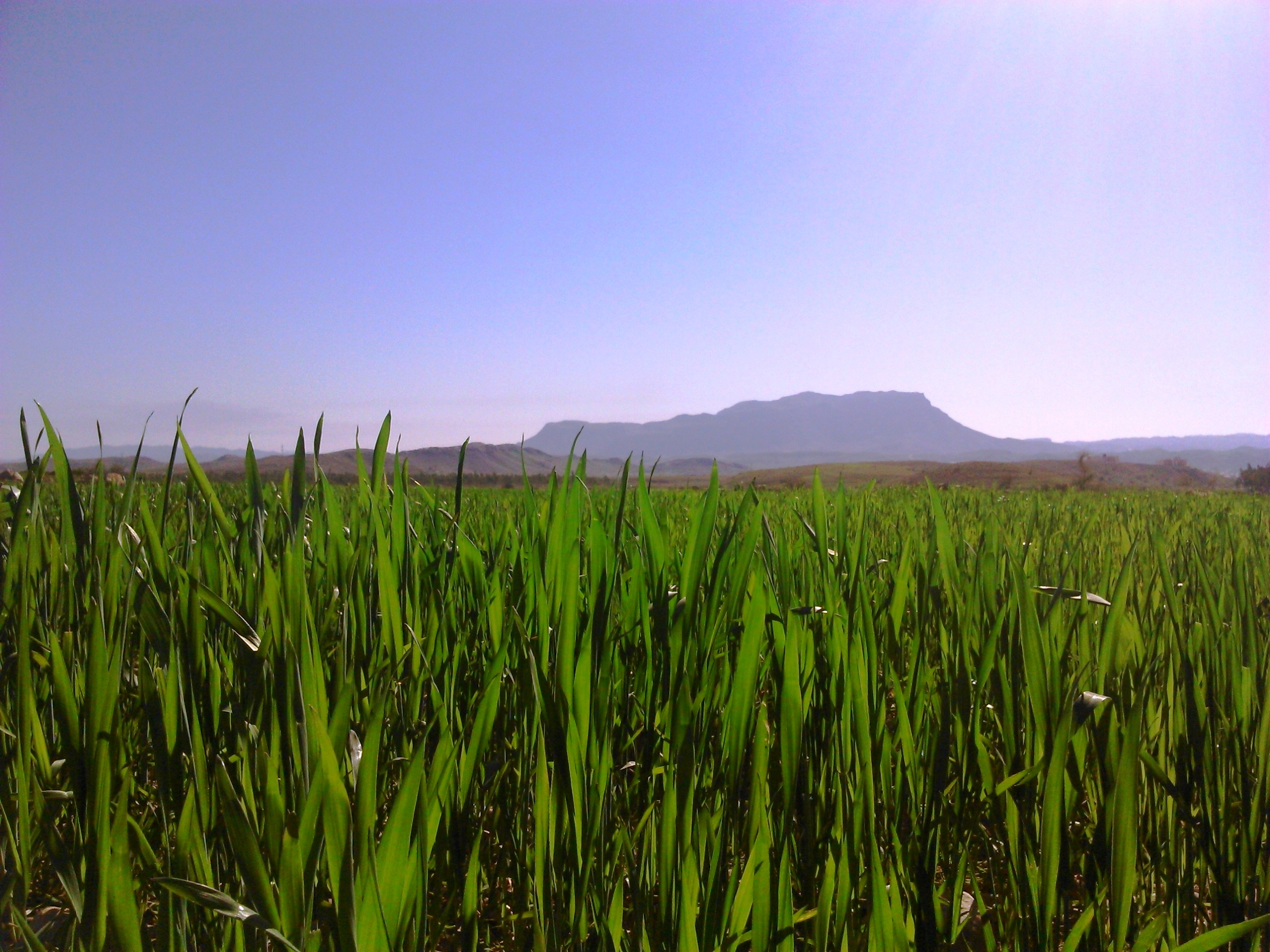
