= Mazraeh Emam =

Village in Isfahan province, Iran

Mazraeh Emam Persian: مزرعه امام
- Village
- Location within Iran
- Coordinates: 32°51′11″N 53°07′23″E
- Country: Iran
- Province: Isfahan
- County: Nain
- District: Central
- Rural District: Bafran

Population (2016)
  - Total: 1,074
- Time zone: UTC+3:30 (IRST)

Mazraeh Emam (Persian: مزرعه امام) (Note: Also romanized as Mazra‘eh Emam; also known as Mazraeh Shah (مزرعه شاه)) is a village in Bafran Rural District of the Central District in Nain County, Isfahan province, Iran.

== Demographics ==
=== Population ===
At the time of the 2006 National Census, the village's population was 851 in 255 households. The following census in 2011 counted 1,118 people in 362 households. The 2016 census measured the population of the village as 1,074 people in 366 households. It was the most populous village in its rural district.
