= Saadatabad-e Vasat =

Saadatabad-e Vasat سعادت ابادوسط
- Village
- Location within Iran
- Coordinates: 29°53′19″N 53°06′53″E
- Country: Iran
- Province: Fars
- County: Marvdasht
- Bakhsh: Seyyedan
- Rural District: Rahmat

Population (2006)
  - Total: 472
- Time zone: UTC+3:30 (IRST)
  - Summer (DST): UTC+4:30 (IRDT)

Saadatabad-e Vasat (Persian: سعادت ابادوسط, also Romanized as Sa‘ādatābād-e Vasaţ; also known as Sa‘ādatābād, Sa‘ādatābād-e Baghal, Sa‘adatābād-e Baghalī, Sa‘ādatābād-e Vosţā, Sa‘ādatābād-e Vosţá, and Sa‘adat Abad Khafrak) is a village in Rahmat Rural District, Seyyedan District, Marvdasht County, Fars province, Iran. At the 2006 census, its population was 472, in 121 families.
