= Aru language =

Aru may refer to:

- One of the Aru languages of Indonesia
- Amol language of Papua New Guinea
- A dialect of Guhu-Samane of Papua New Guinea
- Aru, another name for the Aymaran languages, central Andes
