= Soheyl, Sistan and Baluchestan =

Soheyl سهيل
- Village
- Location within Iran
- Coordinates: 25°42′54″N 61°30′33″E
- Country: Iran
- Province: Sistan and Baluchestan
- County: Chabahar
- Bakhsh: Dashtiari
- Rural District: Bahu Kalat

Population (2006)
  - Total: 162
- Time zone: UTC+3:30 (IRST)
  - Summer (DST): UTC+4:30 (IRDT)

Soheyl (Persian: سهيل; also known as Soheyl-e Pā’īn) is a village in Bahu Kalat Rural District, Dashtiari District, Chabahar County, Sistan and Baluchestan Province, Iran. At the 2006 census, its population was 162, in 39 families.
