= Saadatabad, Marvdasht =

Saadatabad سعادت اباد
- Village
- Location within Iran
- Coordinates: 30°09′02″N 52°38′21″E
- Country: Iran
- Province: Fars
- County: Marvdasht
- Bakhsh: Dorudzan
- Rural District: Abarj

Population (2006)
  - Total: 510
- Time zone: UTC+3:30 (IRST)
  - Summer (DST): UTC+4:30 (IRDT)

Saadatabad (Persian: سعادت اباد, also Romanized as Sa‘ādatābād) is a village in Abarj Rural District, Dorudzan District, Marvdasht County, Fars province, Iran. At the 2006 census, its population was 510, in 123 families.
