= Saadatabad, Abadeh =

Saadatabad سعادت اباد
- Village
- Location within Iran
- Coordinates: 31°04′24″N 52°45′00″E
- Country: Iran
- Province: Fars
- County: Abadeh
- Bakhsh: Central
- Rural District: Bidak

Population (2006)
  - Total: 19
- Time zone: UTC+3:30 (IRST)
  - Summer (DST): UTC+4:30 (IRDT)

Saadatabad (Persian: سعادت اباد, also Romanized as Sa‘ādatābād) is a village in Bidak Rural District, in the Central District of Abadeh County, Fars province, Iran. At the 2006 census, its population was 19, in 6 families.
