= Anjir-e Sefid =

Anjir-e Sefid انجيرسفيد
- Village
- Location within Iran
- Coordinates: 30°31′01″N 50°44′51″E
- Country: Iran
- Province: Kohgiluyeh and Boyer-Ahmad
- County: Kohgiluyeh
- Bakhsh: Central
- Rural District: Dehdasht-e Sharqi

Population (2006)
  - Total: 68
- Time zone: UTC+3:30 (IRST)
  - Summer (DST): UTC+4:30 (IRDT)

Anjir-e Sefid (Persian: انجيرسفيد, also Romanized as Anjīr-e Sefīd; also known as Anjīr-e Sīāh) is a village in Dehdasht-e Sharqi Rural District, in the Central District of Kohgiluyeh County, Kohgiluyeh and Boyer-Ahmad Province, Iran. At the 2006 census, its population was 68, in 16 families.
