= Chahar Bisheh, Fars =

Chahar Bisheh چهاربيشه
- Village
- Location within Iran
- Coordinates: 29°53′16″N 51°08′57″E
- Country: Iran
- Province: Fars
- County: Mamasani
- Bakhsh: Mahvarmilani
- Rural District: Mishan

Population (2006)
  - Total: 67
- Time zone: UTC+3:30 (IRST)
  - Summer (DST): UTC+4:30 (IRDT)

Chahar Bisheh (Persian: چهاربيشه, also Romanized as Chahār Bīsheh; also known as Cham Bīshar) is a village in Mishan Rural District, Mahvarmilani District, Mamasani County, Fars province, Iran. At the 2006 census, its population was 67, in 15 families.
