= Rudbal, Sepidan =

Rudbal رودبال
- Village
- Location within Iran
- Coordinates: 30°05′55″N 52°02′34″E
- Country: Iran
- Province: Fars
- County: Sepidan
- Bakhsh: Hamaijan
- Rural District: Hamaijan

Population (2006)
  - Total: 1,899
- Time zone: UTC+3:30 (IRST)

Rudbal (Persian: رودبال, also Romanized as Rūdbāl and Rūd Bāl; also known as Rūdbāl-e Manūchehr Khān, Rūdbāl-e Markazī, Rūdban, and Rūdbār) is a village in Hamaijan Rural District, Hamaijan District, Sepidan County, Fars province, Iran. At the 2006 census, its population was 1,899, in 407 families.
