= Chahar Bisheh, Masjed Soleyman =

Chahar Bisheh چهاربيشه
- Village
- Location within Iran
- Coordinates: 31°52′00″N 49°21′00″E
- Country: Iran
- Province: Khuzestan
- County: Masjed Soleyman
- Bakhsh: Golgir
- Rural District: Tombi Golgir

Population (2006)
  - Total: 238
- Time zone: UTC+3:30 (IRST)
  - Summer (DST): UTC+4:30 (IRDT)

Chahar Bisheh (Persian: چهاربيشه, also Romanized as Chahār Bīsheh; also known as Chahar Bisheh Janbe Masjed Soleiman) is a village in Tombi Golgir Rural District, Golgir District, Masjed Soleyman County, Khuzestan Province, Iran. At the 2006 census, its population was 238, in 43 families.
