= Ab Anjir, Kerman =

Ab Anjir اب انجير
- Village
- Location within Iran
- Coordinates: 28°51′50″N 57°42′30″E
- Country: Iran
- Province: Kerman
- County: Jiroft
- Bakhsh: Sarduiyeh
- Rural District: Dalfard

Population (2006)
  - Total: 53
- Time zone: UTC+3:30 (IRST)
  - Summer (DST): UTC+4:30 (IRDT)

Ab Anjir (Persian: اب انجير, also Romanized as Āb Anjīr) is a village in Dalfard Rural District, Sarduiyeh District, Jiroft County, Kerman province, Iran. At the 2006 census, its population was 53, in 13 families.
