= Saadatabad, Sepidan =

Saadatabad سعادتاباد
- Village
- Location within Iran
- Coordinates: 29°59′44″N 52°22′18″E
- Country: Iran
- Province: Fars
- County: Sepidan
- Bakhsh: Beyza
- Rural District: Beyza

Population (2006)
  - Total: 475
- Time zone: UTC+3:30 (IRST)
  - Summer (DST): UTC+4:30 (IRDT)

Saadatabad (Persian: سعادتاباد, also Romanized as Sa‘ādatābād) is a village in Beyza Rural District, Beyza District, Sepidan County, Fars province, Iran. Saadatabad had a population 475, and the members of that population make up a total of 108 families according to the 2006 Iranian census.
