= Genavi =

Genavi گنوي
- Village
- Location within Iran
- Coordinates: 28°03′00″N 51°55′00″E
- Country: Iran
- Province: Bushehr
- County: Deyr
- Bakhsh: Central
- Rural District: Howmeh

Government

Population (2006)
  - Total: 90
- Time zone: UTC+3:30 (IRST)
  - Summer (DST): UTC+4:30 (IRDT)
- Website: @iam_pedram

Genavi (Persian: گنوي, also Romanized as Genāvī; also known as Ganaveh and Gināvi) is a village in Howmeh Rural District, in the Central District of Deyr County, Bushehr Province, Iran. At the 2006 census, its population was 66, in 15 families.
