= Saadatabad, Firuzabad =

Saadatabad سعادت اباد
- Village
- Location within Iran
- Coordinates: 28°57′36″N 52°33′17″E
- Country: Iran
- Province: Fars
- County: Firuzabad
- Bakhsh: Meymand
- Rural District: Khvajehei

Population (2006)
  - Total: 102
- Time zone: UTC+3:30 (IRST)
  - Summer (DST): UTC+4:30 (IRDT)

Saadatabad (Persian: سعادت اباد, also Romanized as Sa‘ādatābād) is a village in Khvajehei Rural District, Meymand District, Firuzabad County, Fars province, Iran. At the 2006 census, its population was 102, in 21 families.
