= Saadatabad-e Sofla =

Saadatabad-e Sofla سعادت ابادسفلي
- Village
- Location within Iran
- Coordinates: 29°52′03″N 53°06′18″E
- Country: Iran
- Province: Fars
- County: Marvdasht
- Bakhsh: Seyyedan
- Rural District: Rahmat

Population (2006)
  - Total: 195
- Time zone: UTC+3:30 (IRST)
  - Summer (DST): UTC+4:30 (IRDT)

Saadatabad-e Sofla (Persian: سعادت ابادسفلي, also Romanized as Sa‘ādatābād-e Soflā; also known as Sa‘ādatābād-e Pā’īn) is a village in Rahmat Rural District, Seyyedan District, Marvdasht County, Fars province, Iran. At the 2006 census, its population was 195, in 43 families.
