= Rich Espey =

American dramatist

Rich Espey is an American playwright from Baltimore, Maryland. His plays include Hope's Arbor, which won the Carol Weinberg Award in 2006; Fifty-Fifty which won top honors at the Baltimore Playwrights Festival in 2003; Martha’s Choice; Near and Far; Potter County, named Best Production of 2005-2006 by the Baltimore City Paper; and Ben’s Extraordinary Experiment!.

Hope's Arbor, Espey's most highly regarded play, premiered in Baltimore in 2007, and then ran at the Gallery Players in New York City in 2008. The New York production starred Lauren Marcus and Justine Campbell-Elliott.
