= Sadatabad, Shiraz =

Sadatabad سادات اباد
- Village
- Location within Iran
- Coordinates: 29°46′28″N 52°04′57″E
- Country: Iran
- Province: Fars
- County: Shiraz
- Bakhsh: Arzhan
- Rural District: Qarah Chaman

Population (2006)
  - Total: 82
- Time zone: UTC+3:30 (IRST)
  - Summer (DST): UTC+4:30 (IRDT)

Sadatabad (Persian: سادات اباد, also Romanized as Sādātābād) is a village in Qarah Chaman Rural District, Arzhan District, Shiraz County, Fars province, Iran. At the 2006 census, its population was 82, in 24 families.
