= Chahar Bisheh, Izeh =

Chahar Bisheh چهاربيشه
- Village
- Location within Iran
- Coordinates: 31°51′39″N 49°28′00″E
- Country: Iran
- Province: Khuzestan
- County: Izeh
- Bakhsh: Central
- Rural District: Margha

Population (2006)
  - Total: 75
- Time zone: UTC+3:30 (IRST)
  - Summer (DST): UTC+4:30 (IRDT)

Chahar Bisheh (Persian: چهاربيشه, also Romanized as Chahār Bīsheh; also known as Chahār Bīsheh-ye Qand ‘Alī) is a village in Margha Rural District, in the Central District of Izeh County, Khuzestan Province, Iran. At the 2006 census, its population was 75, in 12 families.
