= Ab Anjir, Jahrom =

Ab Anjir اب انجير
- Village
- Location within Iran
- Coordinates: 28°26′53″N 53°44′37″E
- Country: Iran
- Province: Fars
- County: Jahrom
- Bakhsh: Central
- Rural District: Kuhak

Population (2006)
  - Total: 31
- Time zone: UTC+3:30 (IRST)
  - Summer (DST): UTC+4:30 (IRDT)

Ab Anjir (Persian: اب انجير, also Romanized as Āb Ānjīr; also known as Āb Anjīr va Bas Kūtūk, Āvanjīr, and Das Kūtūk) is a village in Kuhak Rural District, in the Central District of Jahrom County, Fars province, Iran. At the 2006 census, its population was 31, in 9 families.
