= Abtut, Fars =

Abtut اب توت
- Village
- Location within Iran
- Coordinates: 30°20′21″N 51°35′00″E
- Country: Iran
- Province: Fars
- County: Mamasani
- Bakhsh: Central
- Rural District: Jowzar

Population (2006)
  - Total: 21
- Time zone: UTC+3:30 (IRST)
  - Summer (DST): UTC+4:30 (IRDT)

Abtut (Persian: اب توت, also Romanized as Ābtūt) is a village in Jowzar Rural District, in the Central District of Mamasani County, Fars province, Iran. At the 2006 census, its population was 21, in 6 families.
