= Ab Anjir, Darab =

Ab Anjir اب انجير
- Village
- Location within Iran
- Coordinates: 28°36′08″N 55°10′55″E
- Country: Iran
- Province: Fars
- County: Darab
- Bakhsh: Rostaq
- Rural District: Kuhestan

Population (2006)
  - Total: 56
- Time zone: UTC+3:30 (IRST)
  - Summer (DST): UTC+4:30 (IRDT)

Ab Anjir (Persian: اب انجير, also Romanized as Āb Anjīr) is a village in Kuhestan Rural District, Rostaq District, Darab County, Fars province, Iran. At the 2006 census, its population was 56, in 15 families.
