= Esper (surname) =

Esper is a surname, and may refer to:

- Duke Esper (1868–1910), American professional baseball player
- Dwain Esper (1892–1982), American film director and producer
- Eugenius Johann Christoph Esper (1742–1810), German entomologist
- George Esper (1932–2012), American journalist
- Jan Esper (born 1968), German scientist
- Mark Esper (born 1964), American politician
- Michael Esper (born 1976), American actor
