= Saadatabad-e Molla Hoseyni =

Saadatabad-e Molla Hoseyni سعادت ابادملاحسيني
- Village
- Location within Iran
- Coordinates: 29°30′01″N 52°14′40″E
- Country: Iran
- Province: Fars
- County: Shiraz
- Bakhsh: Arzhan
- Rural District: Kuh Mareh Sorkhi

Population (2006)
  - Total: 582
- Time zone: UTC+3:30 (IRST)
  - Summer (DST): UTC+4:30 (IRDT)

Saadatabad-e Molla Hoseyni (Persian: سعادت ابادملاحسيني, also Romanized as Sa‘ādatābād-e Mollā Ḩoseynī; also known as Sa‘ādatābād) is a village in Kuh Mareh Sorkhi Rural District, Arzhan District, Shiraz County, Fars province, Iran. At the 2006 census, its population was 582, in 109 families.
