= Saadatabad, Rafsanjan =

Saadatabad سعادت آباد
- Village
- Location within Iran
- Coordinates: 30°22′09″N 56°02′50″E
- Country: Iran
- Province: Kerman
- County: Rafsanjan
- Bakhsh: Central
- Rural District: Eslamiyeh

Population (2006)
  - Total: 1,148
- Time zone: UTC+3:30 (IRST)
  - Summer (DST): UTC+4:30 (IRDT)

Saadatabad (Persian: سعادت آباد, also Romanized as Sa‘ādatābād) is a village in Eslamiyeh Rural District, in the Central District of Rafsanjan County, Kerman Province, Iran. At the 2006 census, its population was 1,148, in 267 families.
