= Sadatabad, Eqlid =

Sadatabad سادات اباد
- Village
- Location within Iran
- Coordinates: 30°39′25″N 51°55′17″E
- Country: Iran
- Province: Fars
- County: Eqlid
- Bakhsh: Sedeh
- Rural District: Dezhkord

Population (2006)
  - Total: 270
- Time zone: UTC+3:30 (IRST)
  - Summer (DST): UTC+4:30 (IRDT)

Sadatabad (Persian: سادات اباد, also Romanized as Sādātābād) is a village in Dezhkord Rural District, Sedeh District, Eqlid County, Fars province, Iran. At the 2006 census, its population was 270, in 61 families.
