= Aru, Harju County =

Village in Estonia

Coordinates: 59°25′29″N 25°29′25″E

Aru
- Village
- Interactive map of Aru
- Country: Estonia
- County: Harju County
- Parish: Kuusalu Parish
- Time zone: UTC+2 (EET)
  - Summer (DST): UTC+3 (EEST)

Aru is a village in Kuusalu Parish, Harju County in northern Estonia.

== Name ==
Aru was attested in written sources as Arroperre in 1690, Arro in 1844 (referring to the farm), and Арокюля in 1866 (referring to the village). The village is named after its oldest farm, called Arupere: the second part, pere, means 'family, household', and aru means 'dry meadow/grassland; higher, drier land'. The reference work Baltisches historisches Ortslexicon (vol. 1, 1985) cites Arweculle (in 1290) and Arrenküll (in 1291) as the earliest attestations of the name, but these are not certain.
