= Anjir Siah-e Olya =

Anjir Siah-e Olya انجيرسياه عليا
- Village
- Location within Iran
- Coordinates: 28°53′32″N 57°48′41″E
- Country: Iran
- Province: Kerman
- County: Jiroft
- Bakhsh: Jebalbarez
- Rural District: Saghder

Population (2006)
  - Total: 20
- Time zone: UTC+3:30 (IRST)
  - Summer (DST): UTC+4:30 (IRDT)

Anjir Siah-e Olya (Persian: انجيرسياه عليا, also Romanized as Anjīr Sīāḩ-e ‘Olyā; also known as Anjīr-e Sīāḩ, Anjīr-e Sīāh, Anjīr-e Sīyāḩ, and Anjīr Sīāḩ) is a village in Saghder Rural District, Jebalbarez District, Jiroft County, Kerman Province, Iran. At the 2006 census, its population was 20, in 7 families.
