= Soheyl, Isfahan =

Village in Isfahan province, Iran

Soheyl Persian: سهيل
- Village
- Location within Iran
- Coordinates: 33°10′06″N 53°01′27″E
- Country: Iran
- Province: Isfahan
- County: Nain
- District: Central
- Rural District: Bafran

Population (2016)
  - Total: 119
- Time zone: UTC+3:30 (IRST)

Soheyl (Persian: سهيل) is a village in Bafran Rural District of the Central District in Nain County, Isfahan province, Iran.

== Demographics ==
=== Population ===
At the time of the 2006 National Census, the village's population was 48 in 25 households. The following census in 2011 counted 33 people in 18 households. The 2016 census measured the population of the village as 119 people in 48 households.
