= Saadatabad-e Golshan =

Saadatabad-e Golshan سعادت ابادگلشن
- Village
- Location within Iran
- Coordinates: 28°55′24″N 58°45′58″E
- Country: Iran
- Province: Kerman
- County: Narmashir
- Bakhsh: Central
- Rural District: Azizabad

Population (2006)
  - Total: 594
- Time zone: UTC+3:30 (IRST)
  - Summer (DST): UTC+4:30 (IRDT)

Saadatabad-e Golshan (Persian: سعادت ابادگلشن, also Romanized as Sa‘ādatābād-e Golshan; also known as Sa‘ādatābād) is a village in Azizabad Rural District, in the Central District of Narmashir County, Kerman Province, Iran. At the 2006 census, its population was 594, in 120 families.
