= Sadatabad, Hamadan =

Sadatabad سادات اباد
- Village
- Location within Iran
- Coordinates: 34°25′21″N 48°19′20″E
- Country: Iran
- Province: Hamadan
- County: Tuyserkan
- Bakhsh: Qolqol Rud
- Rural District: Qolqol Rud

Population (2006)
  - Total: 73
- Time zone: UTC+3:30 (IRST)
  - Summer (DST): UTC+4:30 (IRDT)

Sadatabad (Persian: سادات اباد, also Romanized as Sādātābād; also known as Dareh ‘Os̄mān, Darreh ‘Os̄mān, Darreh-ye ‘Os̄mān, Dar Sābān, Dar Sāpān, and Dār Uspān) is a village in Qolqol Rud Rural District, Qolqol Rud District, Tuyserkan County, Hamadan Province, Iran. At the 2006 census, its population was 73, in 21 families.
