= Pakuh-e Sefid =

Pakuh-e Sefid پاكوه سفيد
- Village
- Country: Iran
- Province: Kerman
- County: Jiroft
- Bakhsh: Sarduiyeh
- Rural District: Dalfard

Population (2006)
  - Total: 43
- Time zone: UTC+3:30 (IRST)
  - Summer (DST): UTC+4:30 (IRDT)

Pakuh-e Sefid (Persian: پاكوه سفيد, also Romanized as Pākūh-e Sefīd) is a village in Dalfard Rural District, Sarduiyeh District, Jiroft County, Kerman Province, Iran. At the 2006 census, its population was 43, in 10 families.
