= Benvid-e Olya =

Village in Isfahan province, Iran

Benvid-e Olya Persian: بنويدعليا
- Village
- Location within Iran
- Coordinates: 32°42′48″N 53°07′44″E
- Country: Iran
- Province: Isfahan
- County: Nain
- District: Central
- Rural District: Bafran

Population (2016)
  - Total: 85
- Time zone: UTC+3:30 (IRST)

Benvid-e Olya (Persian: بنويدعليا) (Note: Also romanized as Benvīd-e ‘Olyā; also known as Bambīz-e Bālā, Benavīd-e Bālā, Benoyd-e-’Olyā, and Benvīd-e Bālā) is a village in Bafran Rural District of the Central District in Nain County, Isfahan province, Iran.

== Demographics ==
=== Population ===
At the time of the 2006 National Census, the village's population was 331 in 97 households. The following census in 2011 counted 300 people in 129 households. The 2016 census measured the population of the village as 85 people in 36 households.
