= Saadatabad, Kerman =

Saadatabad سعادت اباد
- Village
- Location within Iran
- Coordinates: 30°14′29″N 56°56′31″E
- Country: Iran
- Province: Kerman
- County: Kerman
- Bakhsh: Central
- Rural District: Ekhtiarabad

Population (2006)
  - Total: 917
- Time zone: UTC+3:30 (IRST)

Saadatabad (Persian: سعادت اباد, also Romanized as Sa‘ādatābād) is a village in Ekhtiarabad Rural District, in the Central District of Kerman County, Kerman Province, Iran. At the 2006 census, its population was 917, in 238 families.
