= Saadatabad-e Olya =

Saadatabad-e Olya سعادت ابادعليا
- Village
- Location within Iran
- Coordinates: 29°53′48″N 53°06′27″E
- Country: Iran
- Province: Fars
- County: Marvdasht
- Bakhsh: Seyyedan
- Rural District: Rahmat

Population (2006)
  - Total: 580
- Time zone: UTC+3:30 (IRST)
  - Summer (DST): UTC+4:30 (IRDT)

Saadatabad-e Olya (Persian: سعادت ابادعليا, also Romanized as Sa‘ādatābād-e 'Olyā; also known as Sa‘ādatābād-e Bālā) is a village in Rahmat Rural District, Seyyedan District, Marvdasht County, Fars province, Iran. At the 2006 census, its population was 580, in 133 families.
