= Saadatabad, Mamasani =

Saadatabad سعادت اباد
- Village
- Location within Iran
- Coordinates: 30°12′37″N 51°20′49″E
- Country: Iran
- Province: Fars
- County: Mamasani
- Bakhsh: Central
- Rural District: Bakesh-e Do

Population (2006)
  - Total: 269
- Time zone: UTC+3:30 (IRST)
  - Summer (DST): UTC+4:30 (IRDT)

Saadatabad (Persian: سعادت اباد, also Romanized as Sa‘ādatābād) is a village in Bakesh-e Do Rural District, in the Central District of Mamasani County, Fars province, Iran. At the 2006 census, its population was 269, in 56 families.
