= Saadatabad, Kohgiluyeh and Boyer-Ahmad =

Saadatabad سعادت اباد
- Village
- Location within Iran
- Coordinates: 30°32′59″N 51°29′39″E
- Country: Iran
- Province: Kohgiluyeh and Boyer-Ahmad
- County: Basht
- Bakhsh: Basht
- Rural District: Babuyi

Population (2006)
  - Total: 265
- Time zone: UTC+3:30 (IRST)
  - Summer (DST): UTC+4:30 (IRDT)

Saadatabad (Persian: سعادت اباد, also Romanized as Sa‘ādatābād) is a village in Babuyi Rural District, Basht District, Basht County, Kohgiluyeh and Boyer-Ahmad Province, Iran. At the 2006 census, its population was 265, in 47 families.
