= Benvid-e Sofla =

Village in Isfahan province, Iran

Benvid-e Sofla Persian: بنويدسفلي
- Village
- Location within Iran
- Coordinates: 32°43′48″N 53°09′42″E
- Country: Iran
- Province: Isfahan
- County: Nain
- District: Central
- Rural District: Bafran

Population (2016)
  - Total: 13
- Time zone: UTC+3:30 (IRST)

Benvid-e Sofla (Persian: بنويدسفلي) (Note: Also romanized as Benvīd-e Soflá; also known as Bambīz-e Pā’īn, Benoyd-e-Soflā, and Benvīd-e Pā’īn) is a village in Bafran Rural District of the Central District in Nain County, Isfahan province, Iran.

== Demographics ==
=== Population ===
At the time of the 2006 National Census, the village's population was 34 in 10 households. The following census in 2011 counted 154 people in 58 households. The 2016 census measured the population of the village as 13 people in six households.
