= Separu =

Village in Isfahan province, Iran

Separu Persian: سپرو
- Village
- Location within Iran
- Coordinates: 33°06′26″N 53°01′14″E
- Country: Iran
- Province: Isfahan
- County: Nain
- District: Central
- Rural District: Bafran

Population (2016)
  - Total: 88
- Time zone: UTC+3:30 (IRST)

Separu (Persian: سپرو) (Note: Also romanized as Saparū and Separū; also known as Pākūh and Separ) is a village in Bafran Rural District of the Central District in Nain County, Isfahan province, Iran.

== Demographics ==
=== Population ===
At the time of the 2006 National Census, the village's population was 84 in 38 households. The following census in 2011 counted 67 people in 41 households. The 2016 census measured the population of the village as 88 people in 51 households.
