= Bibi Hakimeh Rural District =

Rural district in Kohgiluyeh and Boyer-Ahmad province, Iran

Bibi Hakimeh Rural District Persian: دهستان بي بي حكيمه
- Rural District
- Location within Iran
- Coordinates: 30°04′18″N 50°45′06″E
- Country: Iran
- Province: Kohgiluyeh and Boyer-Ahmad
- County: Gachsaran
- District: Central
- Capital: Baba Kalan

Population (2016)
  - Total: 1,370
- Time zone: UTC+3:30 (IRST)

Bibi Hakimeh Rural District (Persian: دهستان بي بي حكيمه) is in the Central District of Gachsaran County, Kohgiluyeh and Boyer-Ahmad province, Iran. Its capital is the village of Baba Kalan.

== Demographics ==
=== Population ===
At the time of the 2006 National Census, the rural district's population was 1,789 in 400 households. There were 1,763 inhabitants in 453 households at the following census of 2011. The 2016 census measured the population of the rural district as 1,370 in 391 households. The most populous of its 25 villages was Baba Kalan, with 1,100 people.
