= Boyer Ahmad-e Garmsiri Rural District =

Rural district in Kohgiluyeh and Boyer-Ahmad province, Iran

Boyer Ahmad-e Garmsiri Rural District Persian: دهستان بويراحمد گرمسيرئ
- Rural District
- Location within Iran
- Coordinates: 30°33′18″N 50°45′34″E
- Country: Iran
- Province: Kohgiluyeh and Boyer-Ahmad
- County: Gachsaran
- District: Central
- Capital: Dil

Population (2016)
  - Total: 3,390
- Time zone: UTC+3:30 (IRST)

Boyer Ahmad-e Garmsiri Rural District (Persian: دهستان بويراحمد گرمسيرئ) is in the Central District of Gachsaran County, Kohgiluyeh and Boyer-Ahmad province, Iran. Its capital is the village of Dil.

== Demographics ==
=== Population ===
At the time of the 2006 National Census, the rural district's population was 4,709 in 1,051 households. There were 3,794 inhabitants in 1,115 households at the following census of 2011. The 2016 census measured the population of the rural district as 3,390 in 1,036 households. The most populous of its 17 villages was Dil, with 1,768 people.
