= Emamzadeh Jafar Rural District =

Rural district in Kohgiluyeh and Boyer-Ahmad province, Iran

Emamzadeh Jafar Rural District Persian: دهستان امامزاده جعفر
- Rural District
- Location within Iran
- Coordinates: 30°19′48″N 50°56′23″E
- Country: Iran
- Province: Kohgiluyeh and Boyer-Ahmad
- County: Gachsaran
- District: Central
- Capital: Emamzadeh Jafar

Population (2016)
  - Total: 13,339
- Time zone: UTC+3:30 (IRST)

Emamzadeh Jafar Rural District (Persian: دهستان امامزاده جعفر) is in the Central District of Gachsaran County, Kohgiluyeh and Boyer-Ahmad province, Iran. Its capital is the village of Emamzadeh Jafar.

== Demographics ==
=== Population ===
At the time of the 2006 National Census, the rural district's population was 12,817 in 2,792 households. There were 12,203 inhabitants in 3,135 households at the following census of 2011. The 2016 census measured the population of the rural district as 13,339 in 3,592 households. The most populous of its 72 villages was Ab Garmu, with 1,816 people.
