= Lishtar Rural District =

Rural district in Kohgiluyeh and Boyer-Ahmad province, Iran

Lishtar Rural District Persian: دهستان ليشتر
- Rural District
- Location within Iran
- Coordinates: 30°22′21″N 50°35′51″E
- Country: Iran
- Province: Kohgiluyeh and Boyer-Ahmad
- County: Gachsaran
- District: Central
- Capital: Eslamabad-e Lishtar

Population (2016)
  - Total: 8,543
- Time zone: UTC+3:30 (IRST)

Lishtar Rural District (Persian: دهستان ليشتر) is in the Central District of Gachsaran County, Kohgiluyeh and Boyer-Ahmad province, Iran. Its capital is the village of Eslamabad-e Lishtar.

== Demographics ==
=== Population ===
At the time of the 2006 National Census, the rural district's population was 8,241 in 1,735 households. There were 8,523 inhabitants in 2,179 households at the following census of 2011. The 2016 census measured the population of the rural district as 8,543 in 2,300 households. The most populous of its 65 villages was Chahar Bisheh-ye Olya, with 1,816 people.
