= Gachsaran County =

County in Kohgiluyeh and Boyer-Ahmad province, Iran

Gachsaran County Persian: شهرستان گچساران
- County
- Location of Gachsaran County in Kohgiluyeh and Boyer-Ahmad province (bottom, yellow)

- Location of Kohgiluyeh and Boyer-Ahmad province in Iran
- Coordinates: 30°17′08″N 50°47′04″E
- Country: Iran
- Province: Kohgiluyeh and Boyer-Ahmad
- Capital: Dogonbadan
- Districts: Central

Population (2016)
  - Total: 124,096
- Time zone: UTC+3:30 (IRST)

Gachsaran County (Persian: شهرستان گچساران, Persian pronunciation: [ɡatʃsɒːrɒːn]) is in Kohgiluyeh and Boyer-Ahmad province, Iran. Its capital is the city of Dogonbadan.

== History ==
=== History of Dogonbadan ===
This city was named Gonbad-e Malghan or Gonbad-e Maljan in the past and now Dogonbadan and Gachsaran. There were two domes, one to the west and one to the east of the city, so the city was called Do Gonbadan ("between two domes"). The city was rebuilt by British staff of the Darcy Oil Company about 1927. It is reported that this area was also populated with some British residents who owned houses and vast lands not far from the outskirts of the city.

=== Administrative changes ===
After the 2006 national census, Basht District was separated from the county in the establishment of Basht County.

=== Population ===
At the time of the 2006 census, the county's population was 131,628 in 28,551 households. The following census in 2011 counted 119,217 people in 30,399 households. The 2016 census measured the population of the county as 124,096 in 34,329 households.

=== Administrative divisions ===
Gachsaran County's population history and administrative structure over three consecutive censuses are shown in the following table.

Gachsaran County Population
Administrative Divisions	2006	2011	2016
Central District	109,458	118,022	123,370
Bibi Hakimeh RD	1,789	1,763	1,370
Boyer Ahmad-e Garmsiri RD	4,709	3,794	3,390
Emamzadeh Jafar RD	12,817	12,203	13,339
Lishtar RD	8,241	8,523	8,543
Dogonbadan (city)	81,902	91,739	96,728
Basht District (Note: Transferred to Basht County)	22,170		
Babuyi RD	9,606		
Kuh Mareh Khami RD	4,295		
Basht (city)	8,269		10,764
Total	131,628	119,217	124,096
RD = Rural District

== Economy ==
Gachsaran is an oil- and gas-producing area that has an economy based on its industrial sector. Gachsaran has the largest gas reserves in Iran also has the largest recoverable oil field in Iran and third in the world and has various medicinal plants, citrus and olive. This city has a mild climate in middle and end of winter also has mountains for climbing around the city. So, it is perfect destination for climbing in fall, winter and beginning of spring. This city has enough water resources and there are two big dams near the city which export water to other cities.

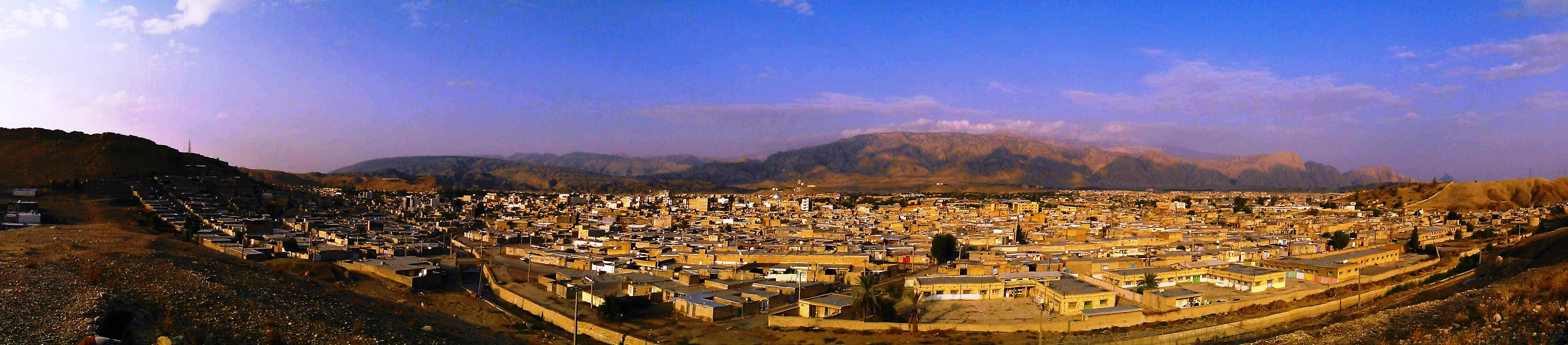
Panorama of Dogonbadan(Gachsaran) city

== Oil and gas production ==
=== Exportation ===
The county is sometimes referred to as Iran’s “oil roof,” a name associated with the Seghalatoun oil well, reported to be 3,221 feet above sea level. It contains oil and gas fields, including what has been described as Iran’s second-largest oil field after Ahvaz. The county is also described as a major energy-producing area and a special economic zone.

=== Gachsaran Oil & Gas Production ===
The Gachsaran Oil & Gas producing company with a distinct geographical situation stretches over provinces of Kohgiluyeh and Boyer-Ahmad province, Fars, Busher, Khuzistan and Isfahan. Total production from about 320 wells is 750,000 bd. The main wells have been drilled at reservoirs of Gach Saran, Bibi Hakimeh, Rag-e-Safid, Pazanan, Gulkhari, Binak, Chilingar, Nargesi, Garangan, Kilur Karim, Sulabedar, Siahmakan, Khaviz, Rudak, Zaaeh, Chahr Bisheh and Kuh-e-kaki.

Out of these regions Gachsaran Reservoir with 500,000 bd and Siahmakan with 4000bd have the highest and lowest production rates respectively.

Gachsaran and Dogonbadan as names of a city are in fact referring to the same place, as the city has two names.

== Gallery ==
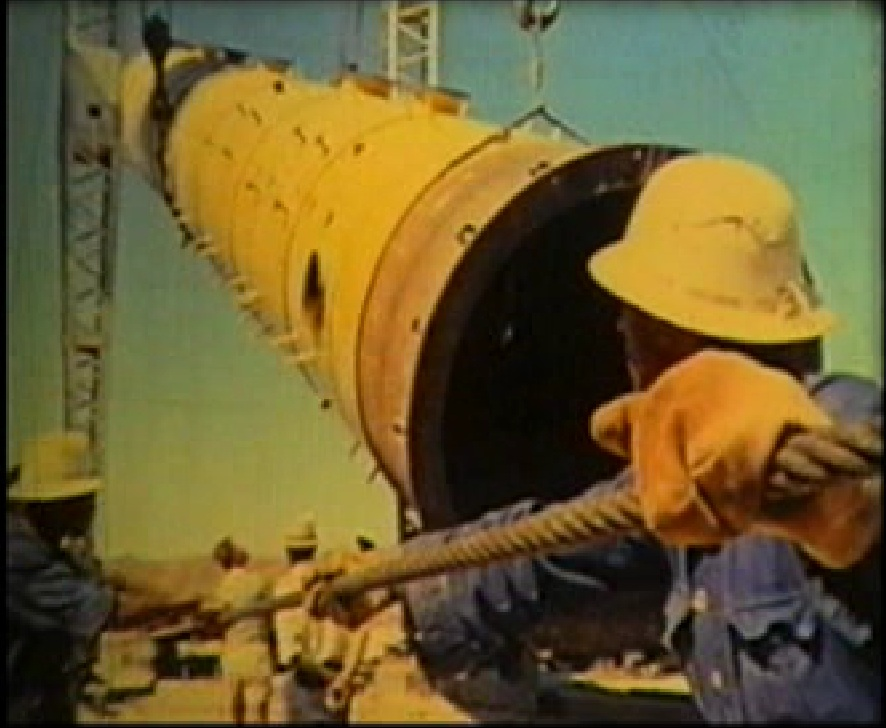
British staff of an oil company in Gachsaran in 1957

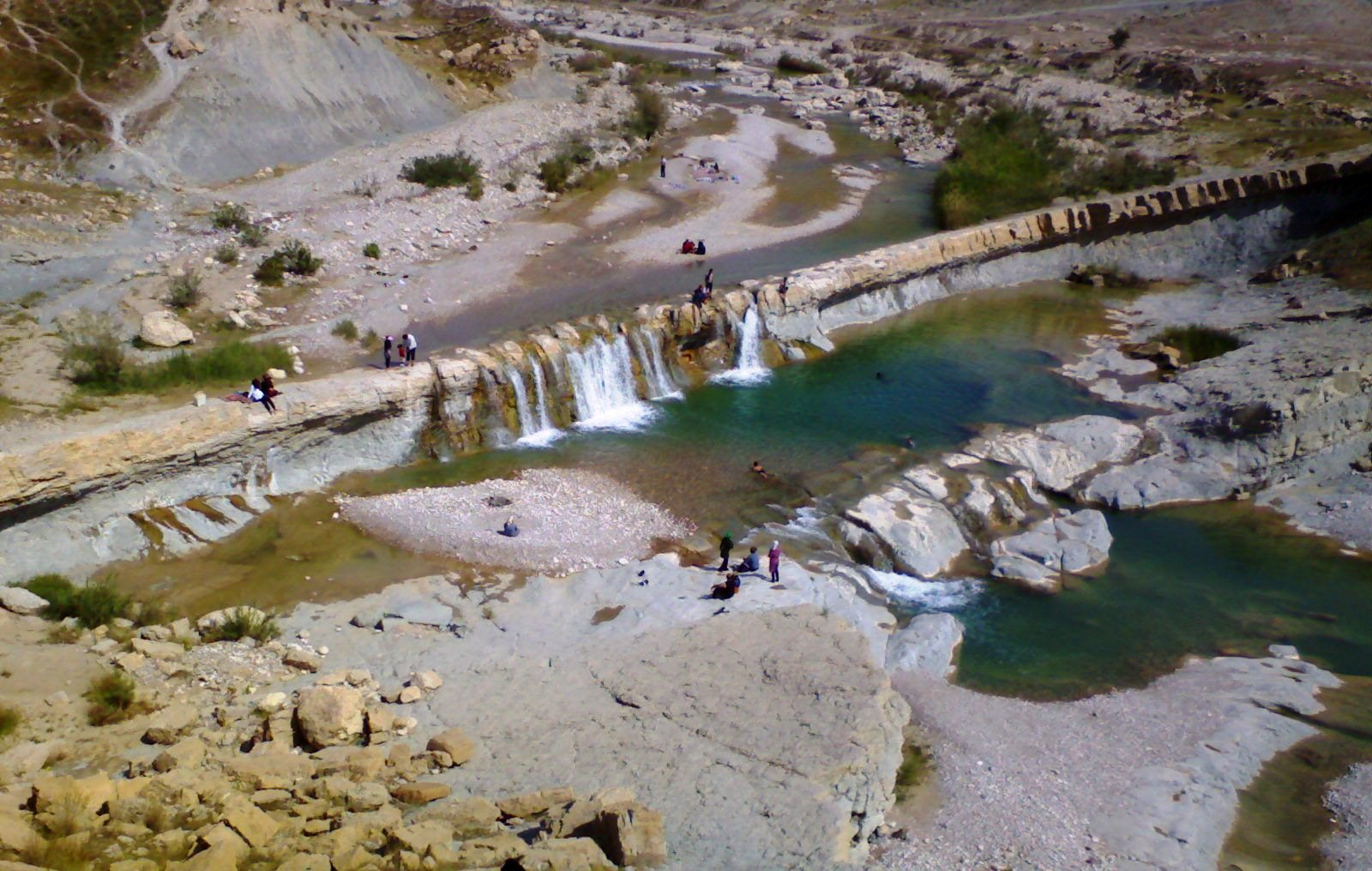
Keyvan Falls in Gachsaran

== See also ==
Media related to Gachsaran County at Wikimedia Commons
