= Central District (Gachsaran County) =

District in Kohgiluyeh and Boyer-Ahmad province, Iran

Central District (Gachsaran County) Persian: بخش مرکزی شهرستان گچساران
- District
- Location within Iran
- Coordinates: 30°17′08″N 50°47′04″E
- Country: Iran
- Province: Kohgiluyeh and Boyer-Ahmad
- County: Gachsaran
- Capital: Dogonbadan

Population (2016)
  - Total: 123,370
- Time zone: UTC+3:30 (IRST)

The Central District of Gachsaran County (Persian: بخش مرکزی شهرستان گچساران) is in Kohgiluyeh and Boyer-Ahmad province, Iran. Its capital is the city of Dogonbadan.

== Demographics ==
=== Population ===
At the time of the 2006 National Census, the district's population was 109,458 in 24,242 households. The following census in 2011 counted 118,022 people in 30,136 households. The 2016 census measured the population of the district as 123,370 inhabitants in 34,089 households.

=== Administrative divisions ===
Central District (Gachsaran County) Population
Administrative Divisions	2006	2011	2016
Bibi Hakimeh RD	1,789	1,763	1,370
Boyer Ahmad-e Garmsiri RD	4,709	3,794	3,390
Emamzadeh Jafar RD	12,817	12,203	13,339
Lishtar RD	8,241	8,523	8,543
Dogonbadan (city)	81,902	91,739	96,728
Total	109,458	118,022	123,370
RD = Rural District
