= Shah Gheyb =

Shah Gheyb شاه غيب
- village
- Location within Iran
- Coordinates: 27°54′22″N 55°01′12″E
- Country: Iran
- Province: Fars
- County: Larestan
- Bakhsh: Central
- Rural District: Darz and Sayeban

Population (2011)
  - Total: 894
- Time zone: UTC+3:30 (IRST)
  - Summer (DST): UTC+4:30 (IRDT)

Shah Gheyb (Persian: شاه غيب, also Romanized as Shāh Gheyb, Shāh-e Gheyb, and Shah Gheib) is a village in Darz and Sayeban Rural District, in the Central District of Larestan County, Fars province, Iran. At the 2011 census, its population was 894, in 233 families.

Its relative position is connected to the village of Chah Nahar from the north side and to the village of Bikhoye from the functions of Larestan city and from the west side to the old village and ends to the protected area of Mount Hormud from the south side.

== Salt dome ==
The old location of this village is located 1.5 kilometers north of the new location of the village, which is also known as Ghadir town. Shah Gheyb salt dome is located on the northeast side of this village, the area of this dome is 64 square kilometers.

There are two ways to access the Shah Gheyb Salt Dome;

1. Through the village of Mezijan located in the south of Zarin Dasht city.

2. Through the road of Shah Gheyb village.

== Geography ==
Shah Gheyb, which is considered one of the villages of Larestan, is a region with an agricultural economy, which in the not-so-distant past was considered the agricultural pole of Larestan, but the hot and dry climate of the region and the existence of salt domes around and within its limits and The severe impact of diapirism on water and soil resources has made the continuation of this economic activity difficult. Also, due to the fact that most of the agricultural lands in the region are irrigated from salty, alkaline and heavy underground water sources or surface streams that pass through salty formations, the soil fertility of the region is always reduced.

== Population ==
This village has a total population of 894, 464 males and 430 females, according to the census of Iran Statistics Center in 2011. The number of households in this village is 233 and it has 178 residential units.
