= Kahneh, Evaz =

Village in Fars province, Iran

Kahneh Persian: كهنه
- Village
- Location within Iran
- Coordinates: 27°54′32″N 54°00′53″E
- Country: Iran
- Province: Fars
- County: Evaz
- District: Central
- Rural District: Evaz

Population (2016)
  - Total: 2,119
- Time zone: UTC+3:30 (IRST)

Kahneh (Persian: كهنه) is a village in, and the capital of, Evaz Rural District of the Central District of Evaz County, Fars province, Iran.

== Demographics ==
=== Population ===
At the time of the 2006 National Census, the village's population was 2,553 in 518 households, when it was in Bid Shahr Rural District of the former Evaz District of Larestan County. (Note: Formerly Lar County) The following census in 2011 counted 2,681 people in 638 households. The 2016 census measured the population of the village as 2,119 people in 603 households.

In 2018, the district was separated from the county in the establishment of Evaz County, and the rural district was transferred to the new Bid Shahr District. Kahneh was transferred to Evaz Rural District created in the new Central District.
