= Qalat, Evaz =

Village in Fars province, Iran

Qalat Persian: قلات
- Village
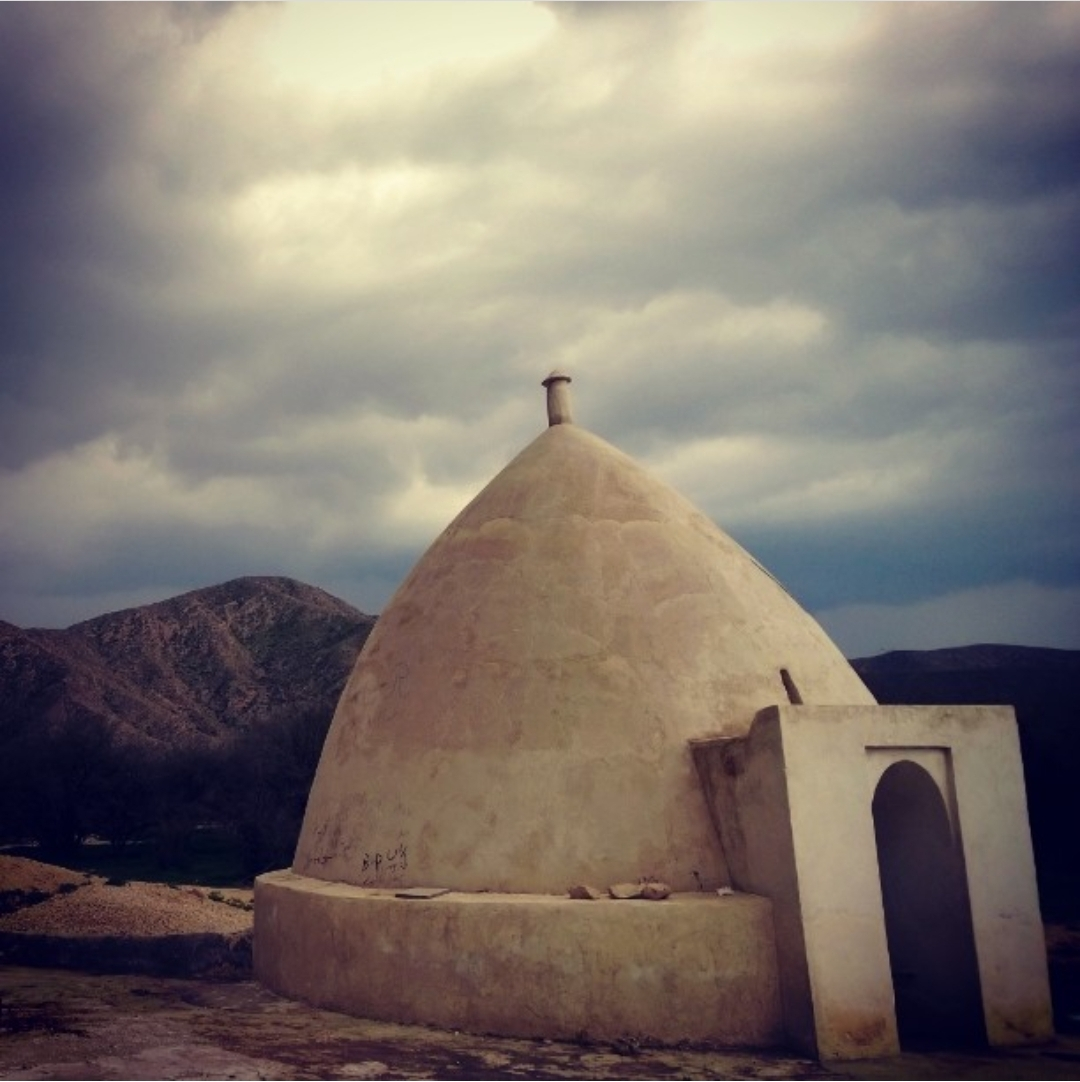
- Reservoir in Qalat

- Location within Iran
- Coordinates: 27°54′23″N 53°54′15″E
- Country: Iran
- Province: Fars
- County: Evaz
- District: Bid Shahr
- Rural District: Qalat

Population (2016)
  - Total: 872
- Time zone: UTC+3:30 (IRST)

Qalat (Persian: قلات) (Note: Also romanized as Qalāt; also known as Ghalat) is a village in, and the capital of, Qalat Rural District of Bid Shahr District, Evaz County, Fars province, Iran.

== Demographics ==
=== Population ===
At the time of the 2006 National Census, the village's population was 808 in 152 households, when it was in Bid Shahr Rural District of the former Evaz District of Larestan County. (Note: Formerly Lar County) The following census in 2011 counted 1,064 people in 240 households. The 2016 census measured the population of the village as 872 people in 228 households.

In 2018, the district was separated from the county in the establishment of Evaz County, and the rural district was transferred to the new Bid Shahr District. Qalat was transferred to Qalat Rural District created in the district.

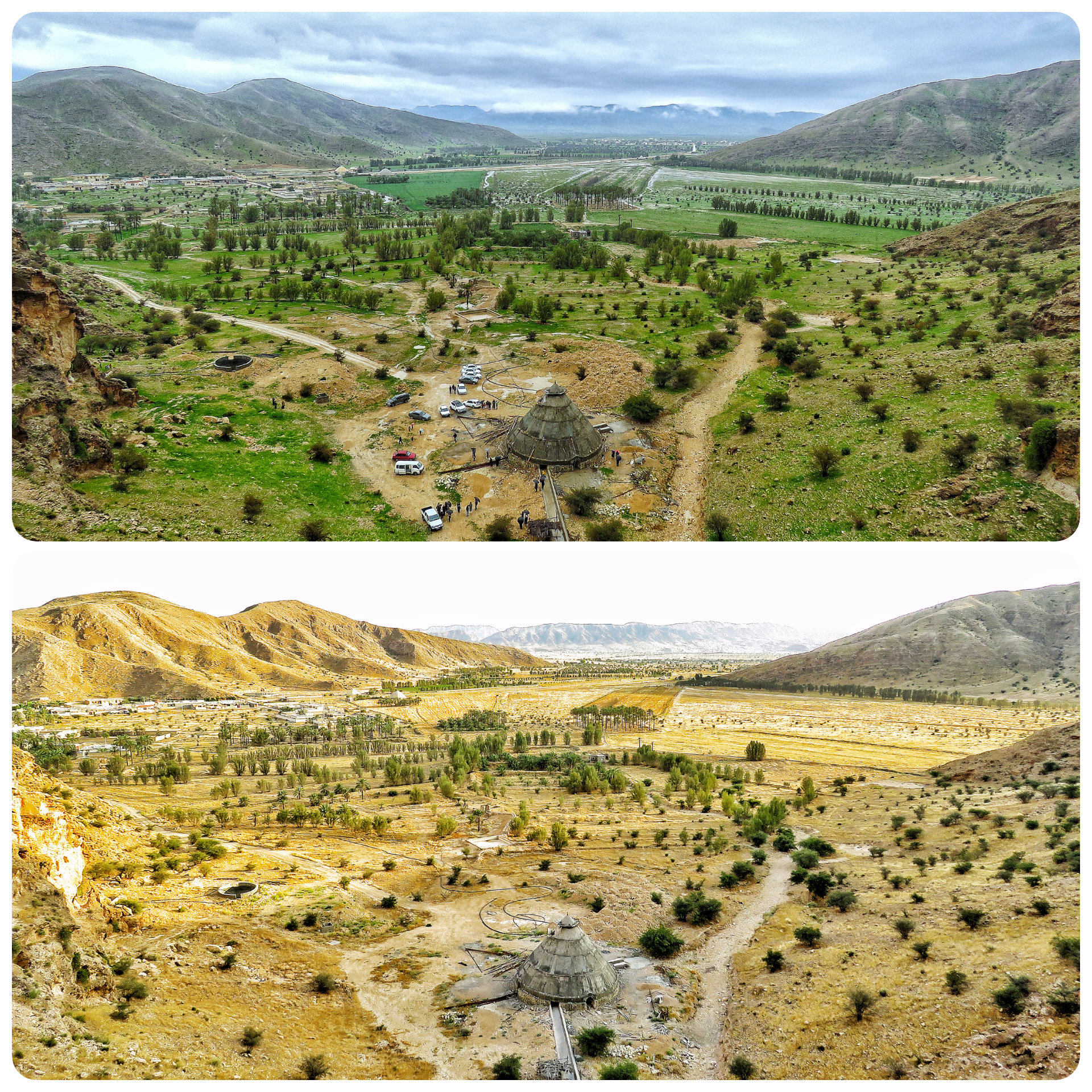
A view of Gori Plain in spring and summer
