= Kohneh-ye Jadid =

Kohneh-ye Jadid كهنه جديد
- Village
- Interactive map of Kohneh-ye Jadid
- Coordinates: 27°51′17.48″N 53°59′41.20″E
- Country: Iran
- Province: Fars
- County: Evaz
- Bakhsh: Central
- Rural District: Evaz

Population (2016)
  - Total: 930
- Time zone: UTC+3:30 (IRST)

Kohneh-ye Jadid (Persian: كهنه جديد, also Romanized as Kohneh-ye Jadīd) is a village in Bid Shahr Rural District, Evaz District, Larestan County, Fars province, Iran. At the 2016 census, its population was 930, in 251 families.
