= Hud, Fars =

Village in Fars province, Iran

Hud Persian: هود
- Village
- Location within Iran
- Coordinates: 27°57′26″N 53°39′49″E
- Country: Iran
- Province: Fars
- County: Evaz
- District: Bid Shahr
- Rural District: Bid Shahr

Population (2016)
  - Total: 1,527
- Time zone: UTC+3:30 (IRST)

Hud (Persian: هود) (Note: Also Romanized as Hood and Hūd)) is a village in, and the capital of, Bid Shahr Rural District of Bid Shahr District, Evaz County, Fars province, Iran. The previous capital of the rural district was the village of Kureh, now a city.

== Demographics ==
=== Population ===
At the time of the 2006 National Census, the village's population was 1,248 in 252 households, when it was in the former Evaz District of Larestan County. (Note: Formerly Lar County) The following census in 2011 counted 1,958 people in 471 households. The 2016 census measured the population of the village as 1,527 people in 394 households.

In 2018, the district was separated from the county in the establishment of Evaz County, and the rural district was transferred to the new Bid Shahr District.
