= Gelar =

Gelar گلار
- Village
- Location within Iran
- Coordinates: 27°52′43″N 53°50′01″E
- Country: Iran
- Province: Fars
- County: Evaz
- District: Bidshahr
- Rural District: Qalat

Population (2016)
  - Total: 910
- Time zone: UTC+3:30 (IRST)

Gelar (Persian: گلار, also Romanized as Gelār) is a village in Bid Shahr Rural District, Bidshahr district, Evaz County, Fars province, Iran. At the 2016 census, its population was 910, in 253 families.
