= Kohneh =

Kohneh or Kahneh (Persian: كهنه) may refer to:

- Kahneh, Bushehr
- Kohneh, Larestan, Fars Province
- Kahneh, Evaz, Larestan County, Fars Province
- Kohneh-ye Jadid, Larestan County, Fars Province
- Kohneh, Hormozgan
- Kohneh, Razavi Khorasan
