= Baladeh =

Baladeh or Bala Deh (Persian: بالاده) may refer to:

== Afghanistan ==
- Bala Deh, Afghanistan, a large village in Gardez District, Paktia Province

== Iran ==
- Baladeh, Fars, a city in Fars province
- Bala Deh, Larestan, a village in Fars province
- Bala Deh, Gilan, a village in Talesh County, Gilan province
- Bala Deh, Hamadan, a village in Nahavand County, Hamadan province
- Baladeh, Mazandaran, a city in Mazandaran province
- Baladeh-ye Kojur, a village in Mazandaran province
- Bala Deh, Mazandaran, a village in Mazandaran province
- Baladeh, Tonekabon, a village in Mazandaran province
- Baladeh District, an administrative subdivision of Mazandaran province
- Baladeh, North Khorasan, a village in Bojnord County, North Khorasan province
- Baladeh-ye Sharqi Rural District, an administrative subdivision of Mazandaran province

== See also ==
- Baladeh Rural District (disambiguation)
