= Juzaqdan =

Juzaqdan جوزقدان
- Village
- Location within Iran
- Coordinates: 27°25′15″N 53°27′57″E
- Country: Iran
- Province: Fars
- County: Larestan
- Bakhsh: Beyram
- Rural District: Bala Deh

Population (2006)
  - Total: 367
- Time zone: UTC+3:30 (IRST)
  - Summer (DST): UTC+4:30 (IRDT)

Juzaqdan (Persian: جوزقدان, also Romanized as Jūzaqdān; also known as Jūzkhadūn) is a village in Bala Deh Rural District, Beyram District, Larestan County, Fars province, Iran. At the 2006 census, its population was 367, in 87 families.
