= Aliabad, Beyram =

Aliabad علي اباد
- Village
- Location within Iran
- Coordinates: 27°24′13″N 53°29′31″E
- Country: Iran
- Province: Fars
- County: Larestan
- Bakhsh: Beyram
- Rural District: Bala Deh

Population (2006)
  - Total: 101
- Time zone: UTC+3:30 (IRST)
  - Summer (DST): UTC+4:30 (IRDT)

Aliabad (Persian: علي اباد, also Romanized as 'Alīābād) is a village in Bala Deh Rural District, Beyram District, Larestan County, Fars province, Iran. At the 2006 census, its population was 101, in 23 families.
