= Sayeban =

Sayeban سايبان
- Village
- Location within Iran
- Coordinates: 27°52′58″N 55°31′06″E
- Country: Iran
- Province: Fars
- County: Larestan
- Bakhsh: Central
- Rural District: Darz and Sayeban

Population (2006)
  - Total: 89
- Time zone: UTC+3:30 (IRST)
  - Summer (DST): UTC+4:30 (IRDT)

Sayeban (Persian: سايبان, also romanized as Sāyebān) is a village in Darz and Sayeban Rural District, in the Central District of Larestan County, Fars province, Iran. At the 2006 census, its population was 89, across 26 families.
