= Ab Gui =

Ab Gui اب گوئي
- Village
- Location within Iran
- Coordinates: 27°27′47″N 53°53′49″E
- Country: Iran
- Province: Fars
- County: Larestan
- Bakhsh: Sahray-ye Bagh
- Rural District: Emad Deh

Population (2006)
  - Total: 20
- Time zone: UTC+3:30 (IRST)
  - Summer (DST): UTC+4:30 (IRDT)

Ab Gui (Persian: اب گوئي, also Romanized as Āb Gū’ī; also known as Ābkūhī) is a village in Emad Deh Rural District, Sahray-ye Bagh District, Larestan County, Fars province, Iran. At the 2006 census, its population was 20, in 5 families.
