= Chah Rigi =

Chah Rigi چاه ريگي
- Village
- Location within Iran
- Coordinates: 27°29′46″N 53°53′57″E
- Country: Iran
- Province: Fars
- County: Larestan
- Bakhsh: Sahray-ye Bagh
- Rural District: Emad Deh

Population (2006)
  - Total: 105
- Time zone: UTC+3:30 (IRST)
  - Summer (DST): UTC+4:30 (IRDT)

Chah Rigi (Persian: چاه ريگي, also Romanized as Chāh Rīgī; also known as Chāh Rangī) is a village in Emad Deh Rural District, Sahray-ye Bagh District, Larestan County, Fars province, Iran. At the 2006 census, its population was 105, in 21 families.
