= Eslamabad, Larestan =

Eslamābād اسلام اباد
- Village
- Location within Iran
- Coordinates: 27°53′34″N 53°52′51″E
- Country: Iran
- Province: Fars
- County: Evaz
- Bakhsh: Bidshahr
- Rural District: Qalat

Population (2016)
  - Total: 679
- Time zone: UTC+3:30 (IRST)

Eslamabad (Persian: اسلام اباد, also Romanized as Eslāmābād) is a village in Qalat Rural District, Bidshahr district, Evaz County, Fars province, Iran. At the 2016 census, its population was 679, in 179 families.
