= Sar Dasht, Fars =

Sar Dasht سردشت
- Village
- Location within Iran
- Coordinates: 27°51′24″N 55°26′21″E
- Country: Iran
- Province: Fars
- County: Larestan
- Bakhsh: Central
- Rural District: Darz and Sayeban

Population (2006)
  - Total: 161
- Time zone: UTC+3:30 (IRST)
  - Summer (DST): UTC+4:30 (IRDT)

Sar Dasht (Persian: سردشت) is a village in Darz and Sayeban Rural District, in the Central District of Larestan County, Fars province, Iran. At the 2006 census, its population was 161, in 32 families.
