= Qods Azad Cooperative =

Qods Azad Cooperative كارگاه شركت قدس ازاد
- Village
- Country: Iran
- Province: Fars
- County: Larestan
- Bakhsh: Central
- Rural District: Howmeh

Population (2006)
  - Total: 28
- Time zone: UTC+3:30 (IRST)
  - Summer (DST): UTC+4:30 (IRDT)

Qods Azad Cooperative (Persian: كارگاه شركت قدس ازاد – Kārgāh Sherkat-e Qods Āzād) is a village in Howmeh Rural District, in the Central District of Larestan County, Fars province, Iran. At the 2006 census, its population was 28, in 5 families.
