= Hirom =

Hirom هيرم
- Village
- Location within Iran
- Coordinates: 27°57′57″N 53°56′01″E
- Country: Iran
- Province: Fars
- County: Evaz
- Bakhsh: Bidshahr
- Rural District: Qalat

Population (2016)
  - Total: 383
- Time zone: UTC+3:30 (IRST)

Hirom (Persian: هيرم, also Romanized as Hīrom; also known as Hīrūm) is a village in Qalat Rural District, Bidshahr district, Evaz County, Fars province, Iran. At the 2006 census, its population was 266, in 42 families. Increased to 383 people and 101 households in 2016.
