= Fishvar =

Village in Fars province, Iran

Fishvar Persian: فيشور
- Village

- Location within Iran
- Coordinates: 27°47′41″N 53°41′02″E
- Country: Iran
- Province: Fars
- County: Evaz
- District: Central
- Rural District: Fishvar

Population (2016)
  - Total: 5,395
- Time zone: UTC+3:30 (IRST)

Fishvar (Persian: فيشور) (Note: Also romanized as Fīshvar) is a village in, and the capital of, Fishvar Rural District of the Central District of Evaz County, Fars province, Iran.

== Demographics ==
=== Language ===
Inhabitants speak a dialect known as Larestani language (اچمی). Ajami

=== Population ===
At the time of the 2006 National Census, the village's population was 5,201 in 920 households, when it was in the former Evaz District of Larestan County. (Note: Formerly Lar County) The following census in 2011 counted 6,220 people in 1,505 households. The 2016 census measured the population of the village as 5,395 people in 1,437 households. It was the most populous village in its rural district.

In 2018, the district was separated from the county in the establishment of Evaz County, and the rural district was transferred to the new Central District.

== Climate ==
There are three main seasons for inhabitants to contend with every year; winter, spring, and a rather harsh summer.

The region is surrounded by the Zagros chain mountains, which prevent the access of rain clouds to southern Iran; as a result the area is served with a poor amount of rain every year and no recorded snowfall. However, there are high mountain peaks covered with snow which often do not last longer than a week. Moreover, people get surprised with sudden heavy rain and lightning which cause destruction of fields and old structures. Temperatures often drop to below 0 °C after midnight; the average can be between 3 °C to 14 °C.

Spring is the season of breeding and harvesting in the area. Lands are covered with a green layer of various plant species which are the best source of nutrition for herbivores. The weather starts to become mild and warm (18–27 °C) which is the sign of oncoming summer.

The heat of summer dries all water sources on the surface of the ground. There is no rain during summer and that is why people preserve water in Beka (برکه), however conservation of water there attracts many types of bacteria. Temperatures in summer can reach 56 °C which is not sustainable with many families, thus prompting them to relocate to more mild areas.
