= Shamzagh =

Shamzagh شمزاغ
- Village
- Location within Iran
- Coordinates: 27°29′45″N 55°09′50″E
- Country: Iran
- Province: Fars
- County: Larestan
- Bakhsh: Central
- Rural District: Howmeh

Population (2006)
  - Total: 20
- Time zone: UTC+3:30 (IRST)
  - Summer (DST): UTC+4:30 (IRDT)

Shamzagh (Persian: شمزاغ, also Romanized as Shamzāgh; also known as Shamrāgh) is a village in Howmeh Rural District, in the Central District of Larestan County, Fars province, Iran. At the 2006 census, its population was 20, in 4 families.
