= Shah Qotb ol Din Heydar =

Shah Qotb ol Din Heydar شاه قطب الدين حيدر
- Village
- Location within Iran
- Coordinates: 27°56′11″N 55°14′05″E
- Country: Iran
- Province: Fars
- County: Larestan
- Bakhsh: Central
- Rural District: Darz and Sayeban

Population (2006)
  - Total: 200
- Time zone: UTC+3:30 (IRST)
  - Summer (DST): UTC+4:30 (IRDT)

Shah Qotb ol Din Heydar (Persian: شاه قطب الدين حيدر, also Romanized as Shāh Qoţb ol Dīn Ḩeydar and Shāh Qoţb od Dīn Ḩeydar) is a village in Darz and Sayeban Rural District, in the Central District of Larestan County, Fars province, Iran. At the 2006 census, its population was 200, in 37 families.
