= Tol Polui =

Tol Polui تل پلوئي
- Village
- Location within Iran
- Coordinates: 27°53′37″N 55°30′39″E
- Country: Iran
- Province: Fars
- County: Larestan
- Bakhsh: Central
- Rural District: Darz and Sayeban

Population (2006)
  - Total: 16
- Time zone: UTC+3:30 (IRST)
  - Summer (DST): UTC+4:30 (IRDT)

Tol Polui (Persian: تل پلوئي, also Romanized as Tol Polū’ī; also known as Taleh Palā’ī and Tom Polū’ī) is a village in Darz and Sayeban Rural District, in the Central District of Larestan County, Fars province, Iran. At the 2006 census, its population was 16, in 5 families.
