= Dowlatabad-e Qadim-e Yek =

Dowlatabad-e Qadim-e Yek دولت اباد قديم1
- Village
- Country: Iran
- Province: Fars
- County: Larestan
- Bakhsh: Central
- Rural District: Darz and Sayeban

Population (2006)
  - Total: 92
- Time zone: UTC+3:30 (IRST)
  - Summer (DST): UTC+4:30 (IRDT)

Dowlatabad-e Qadim-e Yek (Persian: دولت اباد قديم1, also Romanized as Dowlatābād-e Qadīm-e Yek) is a village in Darz and Sayeban Rural District, in the Central District of Larestan County, Fars province, Iran. At the 2006 census, its population was 92, in 18 families.
