= Beriz =

Beriz بريز
- Village
- Location within Iran
- Coordinates: 27°57′19″N 54°19′56″E
- Country: Iran
- Province: Fars
- County: Larestan
- Bakhsh: Central
- Rural District: Dehkuyeh

Population (2006)
  - Total: 2,146
- Time zone: UTC+3:30 (IRST)
  - Summer (DST): UTC+4:30 (IRDT)

Beriz (Persian: بريز, also Romanized as Berīz; also known as Behri and Beri) is a village in Dehkuyeh Rural District, in the Central District of Larestan County, Fars province, Iran. At the 2006 census, its population was 2,146, in 411 families.
