= Lavarestan =

Lavarestan لاورستان
- Village
- Location within Iran
- Coordinates: 27°25′31″N 53°27′34″E
- Country: Iran
- Province: Fars
- County: Larestan
- Bakhsh: Beyram
- Rural District: Bala Deh

Population (2006)
  - Total: 404
- Time zone: UTC+3:30 (IRST)
  - Summer (DST): UTC+4:30 (IRDT)

Lavarestan (Persian: لاورستان, also Romanized as Lāvarestān; also known as Lawar-i-stūn) is a village in Bala Deh Rural District, Beyram District, Larestan County, Fars province, Iran. At the 2006 census, its population was 404, in 92 families.
