= Ahmadun =

Ahmadun احمدون
- Village
- Location within Iran
- Coordinates: 27°48′46″N 53°33′49″E
- Country: Iran
- Province: Fars
- County: Evaz
- Bakhsh: Central
- Rural District: Fishvar

Population (2016)
  - Total: 14
- Time zone: UTC+3:30 (IRST)

Ahmadun (Persian: احمدون, also Romanized as Aḩmadūn; also known as Aḩmadān) is a village in Fishvar Rural District, in Evaz County of Fars province, Iran. At the 2006 census, its population was 31, in 7 families. Decreased to 14 people and 4 households in 2016.
