= Zahed Mahmud =

Zahed Mahmud زاهدمحمود
- Village
- Location within Iran
- Coordinates: 27°34′43″N 55°12′41″E
- Country: Iran
- Province: Fars
- County: Larestan
- Bakhsh: Central
- Rural District: Howmeh

Population (2006)
  - Total: 316
- Time zone: UTC+3:30 (IRST)
  - Summer (DST): UTC+4:30 (IRDT)

Zahed Mahmud (Persian: زاهدمحمود, also Romanized as Zāhed Maḩmūd; also known as Zād Maḩmūd) is a village in Howmeh Rural District, in the Central District of Larestan County, Fars province, Iran. At the 2006 census, its population was 316, in 61 families.
