= Remijan =

Village in Fars province, Iran

Remijan رمي جان
- Village
- Location within Iran
- Coordinates: 27°55′55″N 55°21′46″E
- Country: Iran
- Province: Fars
- County: Larestan
- Bakhsh: Central
- Rural District: Darz and Sayeban

Population (2006)
  - Total: 118
- Time zone: UTC+3:30 (IRST)
  - Summer (DST): UTC+4:30 (IRDT)

Remijan (Persian: رمي جان, also Romanized as Remījān, Rameyjān, and Ramījān) is a village in Darz and Sayeban Rural District, in the Central District of Larestan County, Fars province, Iran. At the 2006 census, its population was 118, in 24 families.
