= Dangez =

Dangez دنگز
- Village
- Location within Iran
- Coordinates: 27°49′18″N 54°14′14″E
- Country: Iran
- Province: Fars
- County: Larestan
- Bakhsh: Central
- Rural District: Dehkuyeh

Population (2006)
  - Total: 474
- Time zone: UTC+3:30 (IRST)
  - Summer (DST): UTC+4:30 (IRDT)

Dangez (Persian: دنگز, also Romanized as Dangz; also known as Dang) is a village in Dehkuyeh Rural District, in the Central District of Larestan County, Fars province, Iran. At the 2006 census, its population was 474, in 117 families.
