= Kahnuiyeh Darz =

Kahnuiyeh Darz كهنويه درز
- Village
- Location within Iran
- Coordinates: 27°51′51″N 55°23′41″E
- Country: Iran
- Province: Fars
- County: Larestan
- Bakhsh: Central
- Rural District: Darz and Sayeban

Population (2006)
  - Total: 36
- Time zone: UTC+3:30 (IRST)
  - Summer (DST): UTC+4:30 (IRDT)

Kahnuiyeh Darz (Persian: كهنويه درز, also Romanized as Kahnūīyeh Darz; also known as Kohneh Darz) is a village in Darz and Sayeban Rural District, in the Central District of Larestan County, Fars province, Iran. At the 2006 census, its population was 36, in 8 families.
