= Pariu-ye Arab =

Pariu-ye Arab پاريوعرب
- Village
- Country: Iran
- Province: Fars
- County: Larestan
- Bakhsh: Central
- Rural District: Darz and Sayeban

Population (2006)
  - Total: 31
- Time zone: UTC+3:30 (IRST)
  - Summer (DST): UTC+4:30 (IRDT)

Pariu-ye Arab (Persian: پاريوعرب, also Romanized as Pārīū-ye 'Arab) is a village in Darz and Sayeban Rural District, in the Central District of Larestan County, Fars province, Iran. At the 2006 census, its population was 31, in 5 families.
