= Shahrak-e Sayeban =

Shahrak-e Sayeban شهرك سايبان
- Village
- Location within Iran
- Coordinates: 27°52′59″N 55°29′51″E
- Country: Iran
- Province: Fars
- County: Larestan
- Bakhsh: Central
- Rural District: Darz and Sayeban

Population (2006)
  - Total: 200
- Time zone: UTC+3:30 (IRST)
  - Summer (DST): UTC+4:30 (IRDT)

Shahrak-e Sayeban (Persian: شهرك سايبان, also Romanized as Shahrak-e Sāyebān; also known as Sāyebān) is a village in Darz and Sayeban Rural District, in the Central District of Larestan County, Fars province, Iran. At the 2006 census, its population was 200, in 39 families.
