= Karishki =

Karishki كريشكي
- Village
- Location within Iran
- Coordinates: 27°24′54″N 53°28′49″E
- Country: Iran
- Province: Fars
- County: Larestan
- Bakhsh: Beyram

Population (2006)
  - Total: 433
- Time zone: UTC+3:30 (IRST)
  - Summer (DST): UTC+4:30 (IRDT)

Karishki (Persian: كريشكي, also Romanized as Karīshkī, Kereshkī, and Kerīshkī; also known as Qal‘eh Kirishki) is a village in Bala Deh Rural District, Beyram District, Larestan County, Fars province, Iran. At the 2006 census, its population was 433, and 114 families.
