= Tall Koshi =

Tall Koshi تل كشي
- Village
- Location within Iran
- Coordinates: 27°28′27″N 53°55′42″E
- Country: Iran
- Province: Fars
- County: Larestan
- Bakhsh: Sahray-ye Bagh
- Rural District: Emad Deh

Population (2006)
  - Total: 125
- Time zone: UTC+3:30 (IRST)
  - Summer (DST): UTC+4:30 (IRDT)

Tall Koshi (Persian: تل كشي, also Romanized as Tall Koshī and Tall Keshī; also known as Gāl-e Bedeh, Qolleh Keshī, Tall Kīshī, and Toleh Keshī) is a village in Emad Deh Rural District, Sahray-ye Bagh District, Larestan County, Fars province, Iran. At the 2006 census, its population was 125, in 29 families.
