= Kamalabad, Larestan =

Kamalabad كمال اباد
- Village
- Location within Iran
- Coordinates: 27°24′26″N 53°30′05″E
- Country: Iran
- Province: Fars
- County: Larestan
- Bakhsh: Beyram
- Rural District: Bala Deh

Population (2006)
  - Total: 128
- Time zone: UTC+3:30 (IRST)
  - Summer (DST): UTC+4:30 (IRDT)

Kamalabad (Persian: كمال اباد, also Romanized as Kamālābād) is a village in Bala Deh Rural District, Beyram District, Larestan County, Fars province, Iran. At the 2006 census, its population was 128, in 30 families.
