= Parigi, Iran =

Parigi پاريگي
- Village
- Location within Iran
- Coordinates: 27°53′05″N 55°31′15″E
- Country: Iran
- Province: Fars
- County: Larestan
- Bakhsh: Central
- Rural District: Darz and Sayeban

Population (2006)
  - Total: 88
- Time zone: UTC+3:30 (IRST)
  - Summer (DST): UTC+4:30 (IRDT)

Parigi (Persian: پاريگي, also Romanized as Pārīgī; also known as Pāragī and Pārekī) is a village in Darz and Sayeban Rural District, in the Central District of Larestan County, Fars province, Iran. At the 2006 census, its population was 88, in 20 families.
