= Baluchi, Fars =

Baluchi بلوچي
- Village
- Location within Iran
- Coordinates: 27°55′08″N 55°34′00″E
- Country: Iran
- Province: Fars
- County: Larestan
- Bakhsh: Central
- Rural District: Darz and Sayeban

Population (2006)
  - Total: 200
- Time zone: UTC+3:30 (IRST)
  - Summer (DST): UTC+4:30 (IRDT)

Baluchi (Persian: بلوچي, also Romanized as Balūchī) is a village in Darz and Sayeban Rural District, in the Central District of Larestan County, Fars province, Iran. At the 2006 census, its population was 200, in 43 families. Most of the People are Farmers. The main product of the village is wheat. The village is surrounded by mounts, mount Galegah on the north and mount Rook on the south. The river Kor is on the east of the village. The nearest villages to Baluchi are Tompoley and Paragi from the west and Kahn from the east.
