= Gav Bast =

Gav Bast گاوبست
- Village
- Location within Iran
- Coordinates: 27°20′28″N 53°49′35″E
- Country: Iran
- Province: Fars
- County: Larestan
- Bakhsh: Sahray-ye Bagh
- Rural District: Emad Deh

Population (2006)
  - Total: 358
- Time zone: UTC+3:30 (IRST)
  - Summer (DST): UTC+4:30 (IRDT)

Gav Bast (Persian: گاوبست, also Romanized as Gāv Bast) is a village in Emad Deh Rural District, Sahray-ye Bagh District, Larestan County, Fars province, Iran. At the 2006 census, its population was 358, in 69 families.
