= Mohammad Qasemi =

Mohammad Qasemi محمدقاسمي
- Village
- Location within Iran
- Coordinates: 27°24′02″N 53°33′15″E
- Country: Iran
- Province: Fars
- County: Larestan
- Bakhsh: Beyram
- Rural District: Bala Deh

Population (2006)
  - Total: 543
- Time zone: UTC+3:30 (IRST)
  - Summer (DST): UTC+4:30 (IRDT)

Mohammad Qasemi (Persian: محمدقاسمي, also Romanized as Moḩammad Qāsemī; also known as Mohammad Ghasem) is a village in Bala Deh Rural District, Beyram District, Larestan County, Fars province, Iran. At the 2006 census, its population was 543, in 93 families.
