= Kohneh, Larestan =

Kohneh كهنه
- Village
- Location within Iran
- Coordinates: 27°47′03″N 54°46′06″E
- Country: Iran
- Province: Fars
- County: Larestan
- Bakhsh: Central
- Rural District: Howmeh

Population (2006)
  - Total: 619
- Time zone: UTC+3:30 (IRST)
  - Summer (DST): UTC+4:30 (IRDT)

Kohneh (Persian: كهنه; also known as 'Alīābād, 'Alīābād-e Kohneh, Kahneh 'Alīābād, Kahneh-ye 'Alīābād, and Kohneh 'Alīābād) is a village in Howmeh Rural District, in the Central District of Larestan County, Fars province, Iran. At the 2006 census, its population was 619, in 137 families.
