= Hormuz =

Hormuz (Persian: هرمز) may refer to:

- The Strait of Hormuz in the Persian Gulf
- Hormuz District, an administrative subdivision of Iran
- Hormuz Island, an Iranian island in the Persian Gulf
- Hormuz, Iran, a city on the island and in the district
- Hormuz, Fars, a village in Fars Province, Iran
- Hormuz, Kerman, a village in Kerman Province, Iran
- Hormuz, alternate name of the village Hormud-e Mehr Khui, Fars Province, Iran
- The Kingdom of Hormuz (11th century–1622)
- Hormuz Formation, a geologic salt feature in Iran

== See also ==
- Hurmuz (disambiguation)
- Hormizd (disambiguation)
