= Bikhuyeh =

Bikhuyeh بيخويه
- Village
- Location within Iran
- Coordinates: 27°55′02″N 55°14′55″E
- Country: Iran
- Province: Fars
- County: Larestan
- Bakhsh: Central
- Rural District: Darz and Sayeban

Population (2006)
  - Total: 309
- Time zone: UTC+3:30 (IRST)
  - Summer (DST): UTC+4:30 (IRDT)

Bikhuyeh (Persian: بيخويه, also Romanized as Bīkhūyeh and Bikhooyeh; also known as Bekhūyeh-ye 'Olyā, Bekhūyeh-ye Soflā, Benjūyeh, Bīkhū, Bīkhūyeh-ye 'Olyā, Bīkhūyeh-ye Soflā, Bīkūyeh, Qal‘eh Bikūi, Qal‘eh-e Bīkūbī, and Qal‘eh-e Bīkū’ī) is a village in Darz and Sayeban Rural District, in the Central District of Larestan County, Fars province, Iran. At the 2006 census, its population was 309, in 61 families.
