= Mohammad Qasim =

Mohammad Qasim and variants (Arabic: محمد قاسم) may refer to:

== People ==
=== Sports ===
- Muhammad Qasim (footballer) (born 1984), Pakistani footballer
- Mohammed Qasem (born 1987), Palestinian footballer
- Mohammed Qasim (born 1991), Emirati cricketer
- Muhammad Qasim (field hockey) (1974–2006), Pakistani field hockey player
- Mohammed Qassem (footballer, born 1990), Saudi Arabian footballer
- Mohammed Qassem (footballer, born 1995), Saudi Arabian footballer
- Mohammed Qasim Majid (born 1996), Iraqi footballer
- Mohammad Qasem (footballer, born 2006), Jordanian footballer

=== Government and politics ===
- Mohammad Qasim (Mardan politician), member of the National Assembly of Pakistan from 2008 to 2013
- Muhammad Qasim (senator), Member of the Senate of Pakistan from 2021
- Mohammad Qasim Fahim (1957–2014), also known as "Marshal Fahim", vice president of Afghanistan
- Mohammad Qasim Hashimzai, Deputy Minister of Justice of the Islamic Republic of Afghanistan
- Mohammad Qasim Osmani (born 1969), Iranian politician
- Mohammad Qasim Osmani (born 1969), Iranian politician
- Mohammad Qasim Rasikh, (born 1971), Afghan Deputy Chief Justice

=== Religion ===
- Muhammad Qasim Nanawtawi (1832–1880), Indian Islamic scholar and co-founder of the Deobandi movement

=== Arts ===
- Muhammad Qasim (miniaturist) (1575-1659), Persian painter in court of Abbas the Great

== Places ==
- Mohammad Qasem, a village in Sistan and Baluchestan Province, Iran
- Mohammad Qasemi, a village in Fars Province, Iran

== See also ==
- Mohammed Kazem (born 1969), Emirati contemporary artist
- Mohammed Kazem Yazdi (1831–1919), Iranian Islamic scholar
- Mohammed Kasim Reed (born 1969), American politician
