= Birak =

Birak (Persian: بيرك), also rendered as Biraq, may refer to:

== Places ==
- Biraq, Fars
- Birak-e Olya, North Khorasan Province, Iran
- Birak-e Sofla, North Khorasan Province, Iran
- Brak, Libya

== People ==
- Christine Birak, Canadian journalist
- Stevan Birak, band leader of Cactus Jack
