= Aliabad-e Owkoshi =

Village in Fars province, Iran

Aliabad-e Owkoshi Persian: علي اباداوكشي
- Village
- Location within Iran
- Coordinates: 27°34′08″N 53°24′52″E
- Country: Iran
- Province: Fars
- County: Larestan
- District: Beyram
- Rural District: Beyram

Population (2016)
  - Total: 173
- Time zone: UTC+3:30 (IRST)

Aliabad-e Owkoshi (Persian: علي اباداوكشي) (Note: Also romanized as ‘Alīābād-e Owkoshī; also known as ‘Alīābād) is a village in Beyram Rural District of Beyram District, Larestan County, (Note: Formerly Lar County) Fars province, Iran.

== History ==
In November 2008, the district was separated from the county in the establishment of Gerash County; however, six months later, the district was returned to Larestan County.

== Demographics ==
=== Population ===
At the time of the 2006 National Census, the village's population was 104 in 24 households. The following census in 2011 counted 203 people in 43 households. The 2016 census measured the population of the village as 173 people in 51 households. It was the most populous village in its rural district.
