= Darz =

Village in Fars province, Iran

Darz Persian: درز
- Village
- Location within Iran
- Coordinates: 27°52′04″N 55°25′20″E
- Country: Iran
- Province: Fars
- County: Larestan
- District: Central
- Rural District: Darz and Sayeban

Population (2016)
  - Total: 1,277
- Time zone: UTC+3:30 (IRST)

Darz (Persian: درز) (Note: Also known as Darz Sāyeh Bān and Darz va Sāyeh Bān) is a village in, and the capital of, Darz and Sayeban Rural District of the Central District of Larestan County, (Note: Formerly Lar County) Fars province, Iran.

== Demographics ==
=== Population ===
At the time of the 2006 National Census, the village's population was 1,357 in 269 households. The following census in 2011 counted 1,388 people in 335 households. The 2016 census measured the population of the village as 1,277 people in 373 households.
