= Estas, Fars =

Estas آستاس
- Village
- Location within Iran
- Coordinates: 27°28′38″N 53°46′54″E
- Country: Iran
- Province: Fars
- County: Larestan
- Bakhsh: Sahray-ye Bagh
- Rural District: Emad Deh

Population (2006)
  - Total: 121
- Time zone: UTC+3:30 (IRST)
  - Summer (DST): UTC+4:30 (IRDT)

Estas (Persian: استاس, also Romanized as Estās) is a village in Emad Deh Rural District, Sahray-ye Bagh District, Larestan County, Fars province, Iran. At the 2006 census, its population was 121, in 21 families.
