= Pehrest-e Olya =

Pehrest-e Olya پهرست عليا
- Village
- Location within Iran
- Coordinates: 27°24′51″N 53°28′21″E
- Country: Iran
- Province: Fars
- County: Larestan
- Bakhsh: Beyram
- Rural District: Bala Deh

Population (2006)
  - Total: 163
- Time zone: UTC+3:30 (IRST)
  - Summer (DST): UTC+4:30 (IRDT)

Pehrest-e Olya (Persian: پهرست عليا, also Romanized as Pehrest-e 'Olyā; also known as Pahrast, Pahrost, Pahrost-e Bālā, Pehrost, and Pohrost) is a village in Bala Deh Rural District, Beyram District, Larestan County, Fars province, Iran. At the 2006 census, its population was 163, in 30 families.
