= Kurdeh, Larestan =

Village in Fars province, Iran

Kurdeh Persian: كورده
- Village
- Location within Iran
- Coordinates: 27°46′55″N 54°25′19″E
- Country: Iran
- Province: Fars
- County: Larestan
- District: Central
- Rural District: Dehkuyeh

Population (2016)
  - Total: 3,595
- Time zone: UTC+3:30 (IRST)

Kurdeh (Persian: كورده) (Note: Also romanized as Kūrdeh; also known as Kūrdeh-e Lār, and Kur-deh-Lâr) is a village in, and the capital of Kurdeh Rural District of the Central District of Larestan County, (Note: Formerly Lar County) Fars province, Iran. The previous capital of the rural district was the village of Dehkuyeh, now a city.

== Demographics ==
=== Population ===
At the time of the 2006 National Census, the village's population was 2,927 in 698 households. The following census in 2011 counted 3,353 people in 868 households. The 2016 census measured the population of the village as 3,595 people in 1,042 households.
