= Pehrest =

Pehrest or Pehrost or Pahrost or Pahrast or Pohrost (Persian: پهرست) may refer to:

- Pehrest-e Olya
- Pehrest-e Sofla
