= Pehrest-e Sofla =

Pehrest-e Sofla پهرست سفلي
- Village
- Location within Iran
- Coordinates: 27°25′16″N 53°27′55″E
- Country: Iran
- Province: Fars
- County: Larestan
- Bakhsh: Beyram
- Rural District: Bala Deh

Population (2006)
  - Total: 172
- Time zone: UTC+3:30 (IRST)
  - Summer (DST): UTC+4:30 (IRDT)

Pehrest-e Sofla (Persian: پهرست سفلي, also Romanized as Pehrest-e Soflá; also known as Pahrast-e Soflá) is a village in Bala Deh Rural District, Beyram District, Larestan County, Fars province, Iran. At the 2006 census, its population was 172, in 42 families.
