= Huwala people =

Term usually used to refer to Iranian Arabs originating from the Arabian Peninsula

Huwala
الهُوَلَة

Regions with significant populations
- Bahrain, United Arab Emirates, Kuwait, Qatar

Languages
- Gulf Arabic

Religion
- Sunni Islam

Huwala (Arabic: الهولة, sing. Huwali هولي) also collectively referred to as Bani Huwala, are Arabian Persians of tribal lineage who initially migrated to Persia in the 13th and 14th century and intermixed with the indigenous population of older Arabic-speaking background. Such migrations continued till around 19th century to the area which is now Iran's Hormozgan province and Fars province, mainly Bandar Abbas, Qishm, and the mainland near Bandar Lengeh. The Huwala follow Sunni Islam, like most Peninsular Arabs, and as opposed to the majority of Persians, who are Twelver Shia. Most of the Huwala have remigrated back to the Arabian Peninsula between late 19th century and early 20th century. The imposition of restrictive economic policies by Reza Shah in the 1930s led to the migration of most of the rest of the Huwala back to the Arabian Peninsula.

The term "Huwala" does not refer to Sunni Larestani Achomi families such as Awadhi, Kandari, Janahi, Khaloori, Zarooni, and Bastaki. It specifically refers to the actual Arab Huwalas (Arab El-Sahel), which encompasses the Qawasem, Hammadi, Al Nasur/Nassour, Obaidli, and Bani Tamim tribes.

The original Huwalas have commonly been referred to as "the Arabs of the Eastern Coast" (Arabic: عرب الساحل الشرقي), or simply "Arabs of Persia" (Arabic: عرب فارس).

Although Huwalas and Achomis have lived in close proximity to each other in Southern Persia, they are genetically dissimilar. Huwalas are relatively recent inhabitants of Southern Iran migrating from Arabia over the past five centuries.

== Etymology ==
Huwala (Arabic: الهولة), is a plural Arabic term for Huwali (Arabic: هولي). The meaning of the word remains unclear, and many Gulf historians continue to debate its origins and significance. Contrary to popular belief, there is very little evidence to support the claim that it means "to change over."

It appears that the Huwala was a tribal confederation formed in Coastal Oman, similar to the Al-Utub confederation, who were at times their arch rivals. However, it appears that the term was abandoned shortly thereafter, which explains its disappearance in the oral tradition of the Huwalas themselves.

A book by Dejanirah Couto and Rui Loureiro into Portuguese interactions in Hormuz defines Huwala as "migrant Arabs".

Little is known about the Arab migrants who settled on the Iranian coast between Bushehr and Lengeh in the late 1500s. They were a disparate group of small tribes of sailors, traders, fishermen, pearl divers, and cultivators. Although they were all referred to as the Bani Hula, they were not a uniform group. In fact, they were each other's fiercest competitors for access to the pearl banks.

— The Persian Gulf: The Hula Arabs of The Shibkuh Coast of Iran by Willem Floor

Author Lawrence G. Potter defines Huwala as

..Groups of Sunni Arabs that migrated from Oman and the eastern coast of the Arabian Peninsula to the Iranian side the Gulf, between Bushehr and Bandar Abbas, probably starting in the eighteenth century. They eventually returned to the Arab side, especially after the discovery of oil and the imposition of restrictive economic policies by Reza Shah in the 1930s

— Society in the Persian Gulf: Before and After Oil by Lawrence G. Potter, p.10

== History ==
In the 18th century, the Arab Al Qasimi tribal affiliation, once a major maritime power, took control of southern Iranian coasts and islands around Bandar Lengeh. In 1779 the Iranian Zand dynasty acknowledged a fait accompli and recognized a Qasimi as local ruler (farmandar) of Bandar Lengeh. At about the same time the Zands allowed the British East India Company to establish its residency and presence in Bushehr. The Qasimis remained in control of Bandar Lengeh and surrounding region until 1887, when they were defeated by the British in their self proclaimed “anti-piracy” campaign which Emirati based scholars (including current Sharjah ruler Sultan bin Muhammad Al-Qasimi) argue was a myth used to dominate trade routes to India and Iraq. The Qasimis retreated to the southern coast of the Gulf, and their Iranian domains reverted to nominal rule by Tehran.

The Achomi (Larestani) Iranian population lived on the coast alongside the Qasimis. They prospered under Al Qasimi rule as merchants in pearl trading. Author John W. Limbert argues that in response to Reza Shah Pahlavi's policies of centralization, conscription, civil status reforms, and, most important, the forced unveiling of women led to many of the Achomis to follow the Qasimis back to the Arabian Peninsula, further mixing the Huwala's Arabic and Persian roots.

== Identity and origin ==
Contemporary historians of that period, such as Niebuhr, Lorimer, David Seton, and others, did not neglect to record for us a huge number of political and social events in the Gulf during the period preceding the period of the recent migration of the inhabitants of the southern Iranian region to the Gulf states during the reign of Shah Reza Pahlavi at the beginning of the twentieth century AD. We find in these historians a clear description of the identity of the true Huwala Arabs according to geographical and social standards.

These historians agree geographically that the Huwala Arabs live in a specific geographical area starting from Bandar Kanj in the south and reaching Bandar Kangan in the north, and from the coast of the Arabian Gulf in the west to the region of the (Shibkoh) mountains in the east. This geographical area is called the Shibkoh (شيبكوه) region, meaning the sloping mountain, and there are no Huwala Arabs according to this description in the regions outside this region, such as the Bandar Abbas, Bastak, Bushehr, Falamarz, Ahvaz or Abdan regions.

According to the Saudi historian Jalal Al-Ansari, there are two types of Huwalas:

- The first type consists of the original Arabs who migrated to Southern Iran from Coastal Eastern Arabia during the 16th and 17th centuries, such as the Bani Hammad, Qawasim, Obaidli, and Al-Haram. Those are now are now referred to Arab Fāris (عرب فارس) or Arab al-Sāḥil (عرب الساحل).
- The second type of Huwalas refers to the indigenous people of Southern Iran who resided under the rule of the aforementioned tribes and later migrated back with them to Arabia during the 20th century after the invasion by the Iranian government.

== Huwala families ==
Zur is a reasonably large town which is fortifies in the local manner and which has some pieces of artillery. it is inhabited by a tribe of Huwala called Qawasim these have been in earlier times subject to the imam of muscat but they do not recognise his authority any more

— Baron van Kniphausen, The Blood-red Arab Flag: An Investigation Into Qasimi Piracy, 1797-1820 By Charles E. Davies, p.173

Historical sources tell us that the "Al-Hawla Arabs" do not descend from a single tribe, but rather they descend from a union of several specific Arab tribes. We must focus here on the word “specific,” as the tribes belonging to the "Huwala Arabs" are the following tribes:

1. Al Qasimi or Al-Qawasim
2. Al Marzooqi or Al-Marazeeq
3. Al-Ali
4. Bani Bishr
5. Bani Hammad or Al-Hammadi
6. Bani Obaidel or Al-Obaidly
7. Al-Haram or Al-Harami
8. Bani malik or Al-Malki
9. Bani Tamim or Al Tamim
10. Al Nasur/Nassour or Al-Mathkur

== Confusion with Achomis ==
According to a 2013 study by the Dubai-based Al Mesbar Studies & Research Center, the linguistic and religious situation of Sunni Persians in Bahrain is thorny, and sometimes there is intentional confusion between "Hole\Hawala Arabs" and "Sunni Persians".

== See also ==
- Ajam of Bahrain
- Ajam of Kuwait
- History of Bahrain
- History of Kuwait
- Culture of Eastern Arabia
