= Aveh, Fars =

Aveh اوه
- Village
- Interactive map of Aveh
- Coordinates: 27°33′17″N 55°19′45″E
- Country: Iran
- Province: Fars
- County: Larestan
- Bakhsh: Central
- Rural District: Howmeh

Population (2006)
  - Total: 215
- Time zone: UTC+3:30 (IRST)
  - Summer (DST): UTC+4:30 (IRDT)

Aveh (Persian: اوه, also Romanized as Āveh) is a village in Howmeh Rural District, in the Central District of Larestan County, Fars province, Iran. At the 2006 census, its population was 215, in 39 families.
