= Didehban, Fars =

Village in Fars province, Iran

Didehban Persian: ديده بان
- Village
- Location within Iran
- Coordinates: 27°32′11″N 53°43′47″E
- Country: Iran
- Province: Fars
- County: Larestan
- District: Sahray-ye Bagh
- Rural District: Emad Deh

Population (2016)
  - Total: 779
- Time zone: UTC+3:30 (IRST)

Didehban (Persian: ديده بان) (Note: Also romanized as Dīdehbān; also known as Dīdebān) is a village in, and the capital of, Emad Deh Rural District of Sahray-ye Bagh District, Larestan County, (Note: Formerly Lar County) Fars province, Iran. The previous capital of the rural district was the village of Emad Deh, now the city of Emadshahr.

== Demographics ==
=== Population ===
At the time of the 2006 National Census, the village's population was 1,620 in 352 households. The following census in 2011 counted 1,350 people in 342 households. The 2016 census measured the population of the village as 779 people in 244 households. It was the most populous village in its rural district.
