= Zarvan =

Zarvan or Zaravan or Zarun or Zarwan (Persian: زروان) may refer to:

- Zaravan, Fars
- Zarvan, Kurdistan
