= Kureh, Fars =

City in Fars province, Iran

Kureh Persian: كوره
- City
- Location within Iran
- Coordinates: 27°55′12″N 53°47′42″E
- Province: Fars
- County: Evaz
- District: Bid Shahr

Population (2016)
  - Total: 2,706
- Time zone: UTC+3:30 (IRST)

Kureh (Persian: كوره) (Note: Also romanized as Kowreh) is a city in, and the capital of, Bid Shahr District of Evaz County, Fars province, Iran. As a village, it was the capital of Bid Shahr Rural District until its capital was transferred to the village of Hud.

== Demographics ==
=== Population ===
At the time of the 2006 National Census, Kureh's population was 2,550 in 552 households, when it was a village in Bid Shahr Rural District of the former Evaz District of Larestan County. (Note: Formerly Lar County) The following census in 2011 counted 3,127 people in 713 households. The 2016 census measured the population of the village as 2,706 people in 748 households.

In 2018, the district was separated from the county in the establishment of Evaz County, and the rural district was transferred to the new Bid Shahr District. Kureh was elevated to the status of a city.

== Overview ==
Kureh is an ancient village whose age ranges between 2500 and 3000 years. It is distinguished by its ancient castle and cemetery (Mirmansur), which is up to 950 years old, and the Sheikh Mubarak Mosque, whose foot reaches the date of 780 AH, as well as the factory (Bazai bricks) Shah Reis Allanqani (the bricks are bricks of clay, which they burn in factories or kilns), wheels in the mountains and historical graves, and from the ruins of Kureh also the castle of Kaldo and an old tower that dates back to it before Islam.

Iron melting place, ceramic kiln. Many of the people of Kureh have migrated to Harang and Al-Banader areas in search of safety and stability from some problems in their area. The most important Kureh peoples are: Rais, Mulla, Qaid, Mirshkar.
