= Aveh =

Aveh may refer to:

- Avaj, a city in Iran
- Aveh, Fars, a village in Iran
- Aveh, Markazi, a village in Iran
- Aveh, Qazvin, a village in Iran
- a fictional place in Xenogears, see: Xenogears#Setting
