= Azhdeha Peykar Castle =

Iranian national heritage site

- قلعه اژدهاپیکر
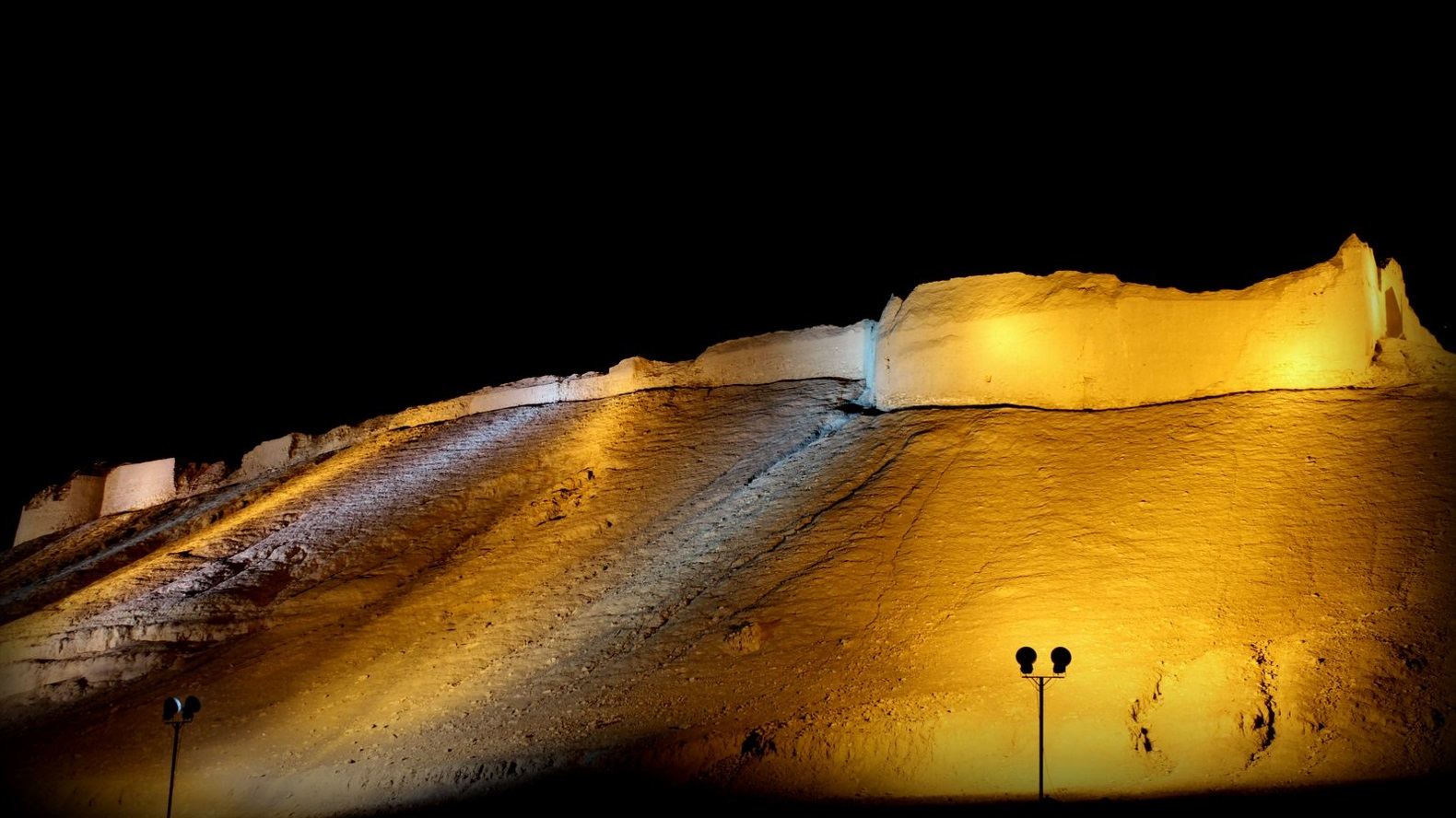
- Interactive map of the Azhdeha Peykar Castle area

General information
- Type: Castle
- Location: Larestan County, Iran
- Coordinates: 27°41′08″N 54°20′01″E

Azhdeha Peykar Castle (Persian: قلعه اژدهاپیکر lit. Dragon Body Castle) is a historical castle located in Larestan County in Fars province, The longevity of this fortress dates back to the Sasanian Empire.
