= Evaz Rural District =

Rural district in Fars province, Iran

Evaz Rural District Persian: دهستان اوز
- Rural District
- Location within Iran
- Coordinates: 27°50′06″N 53°58′50″E
- Country: Iran
- Province: Fars
- County: Evaz
- District: Central
- Capital: Kahneh
- Time zone: UTC+3:30 (IRST)

Evaz Rural District (Persian: دهستان اوز) is in the Central District of Evaz County, Fars province, Iran. Its capital is the village of Kahneh, whose population at the time of the 2016 National Census was 2,119 in 603 households.

== History ==
In July 2018, Evaz District was separated from Larestan County (Note: Formerly Lar County) in the establishment of Evaz County, and Evaz Rural District was created in the new Central District.
