= Berak, Larestan =

Village in Fars province, Iran

Berak Persian: براك
- Village
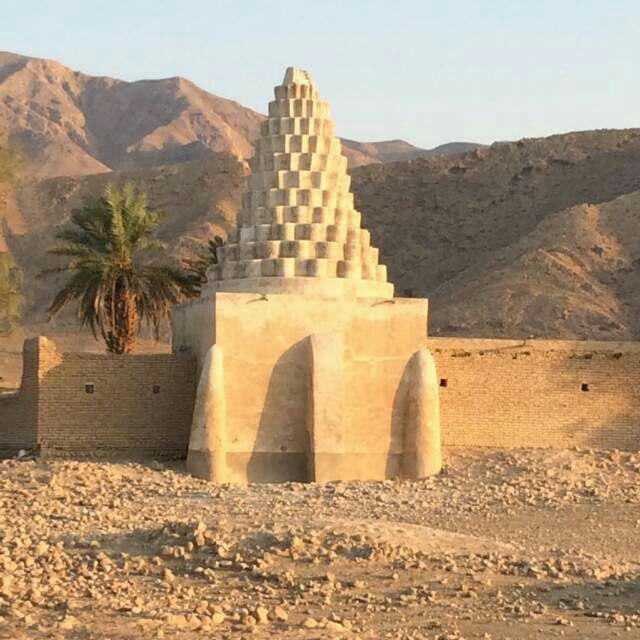

- Location within Iran
- Coordinates: 27°40′07″N 54°23′40″E
- Country: Iran
- Province: Fars
- County: Larestan
- District: Central
- Rural District: Howmeh

Population (2016)
  - Total: 2,882
- Time zone: UTC+3:30 (IRST)

Berak (Persian: براك) (Note: Also romanized as Berāk; also known as Barrāq and Bīraq) is a village in Howmeh Rural District of the Central District of Larestan County, (Note: Formerly Lar County) Fars province, Iran.

== Demographics ==
=== Population ===
At the time of the 2006 National Census, the village's population was 2,355 in 559 households. The following census in 2011 counted 2,733 people in 706 households. The 2016 census measured the population of the village as 2,882 people in 838 households. It was the most populous village in its rural district.
