= Estas =

Estas may refer to:

- Estas, Fars, a village in Larestan County, Fars Province, Iran
- Estás, Tomino, a parroquia in Tomiño, Galicia, Spain
- Estas Tonne (born 1975), Ukrainian musician

== See also ==
- Esta (disambiguation)
