= Bala Deh, Larestan =

Village in Fars province, Iran

Bala Deh Persian: بالاده
- Village
- Location within Iran
- Coordinates: 27°24′06″N 53°34′52″E
- Country: Iran
- Province: Fars
- County: Larestan
- District: Beyram
- Rural District: Bala Deh

Population (2016)
  - Total: 2,166
- Time zone: UTC+3:30 (IRST)

Bala Deh (Persian: بالاده) (Note: Also romanized as Bālā Deh) is a village in, and the capital of, Bala Deh Rural District of Beyram District, Larestan County, (Note: Formerly Lar County) Fars province, Iran.

== History ==
In November 2008, the district was separated from the county in the establishment of Gerash County; however, six months later, the district was returned to Larestan County.

== Demographics ==
=== Population ===
At the time of the 2006 National Census, the village's population was 1,751 in 340 households. The following census in 2011 counted 2,191 people in 603 households. The 2016 census measured the population of the village as 2,166 people in 611 households. It was the most populous village in its rural district.
