= Esta =

Esta or ESTA may refer to:

- Esta (given name), including a list of people with the name
- Esta Brook, a pen name of American novelist and short story writer Lizzie P. Evans-Hansell
- ESTA Holding, a Ukrainian real estate company
- Electronic System for Travel Authorization
- Emergency Services Telecommunications Authority, the emergency call-processing and service-dispatch agency for Victoria, Australia
- Entertainment Services and Technology Association
- ICAO code for Ängelholm–Helsingborg Airport, Sweden
- European String Teachers Association; see Bruno Giuranna
- Eastern Sierra Transit Authority

== See also ==
- Estas (disambiguation)
- Esta Noche (disambiguation)
