= Khalur =

Khalur خلور
- Village
- Location within Iran
- Coordinates: 27°31′53″N 54°07′32″E
- Country: Iran
- Province: Fars
- County: Larestan
- Bakhsh: Sahray-ye Bagh
- Rural District: Sahray-ye Bagh

Population (2006)
  - Total: 503
- Time zone: UTC+3:30 (IRST)
  - Summer (DST): UTC+4:30 (IRDT)

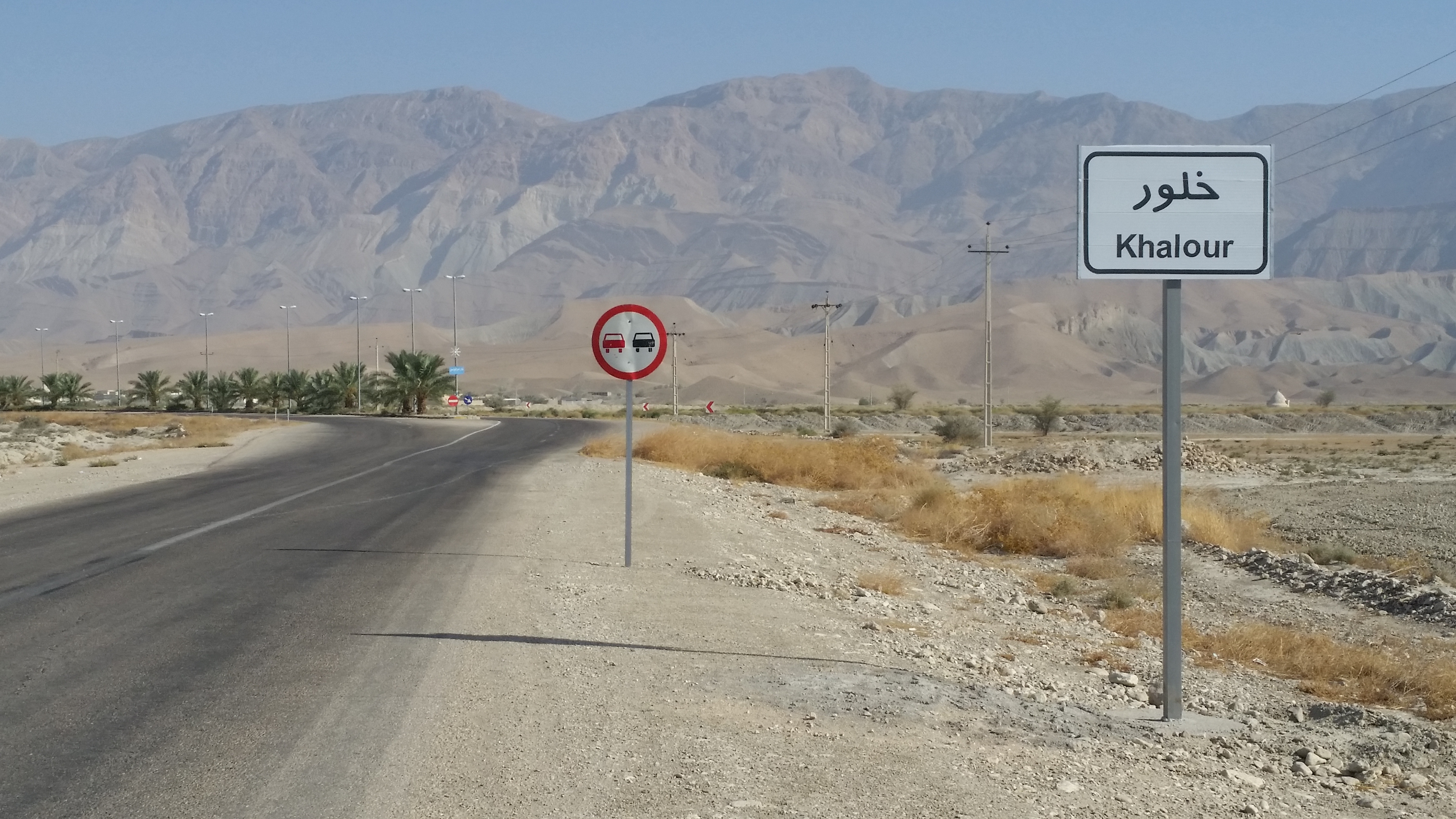

Khalur (Persian: خلور, also Romanized as Khalūr and Kholūr; also known as Khaloor) is a village in Sahray-ye Bagh Rural District, Sahray-ye Bagh District, Larestan County, Fars province, Iran. At the 2006 census, its population was 503, in 118 families.
