= Shah Neshin Castle =

Castle in Fars province, Iran

Shah Neshin castle
- قلعه شاه‌نشین

General information
- Type: Castle
- Location: Larestan County, Iran

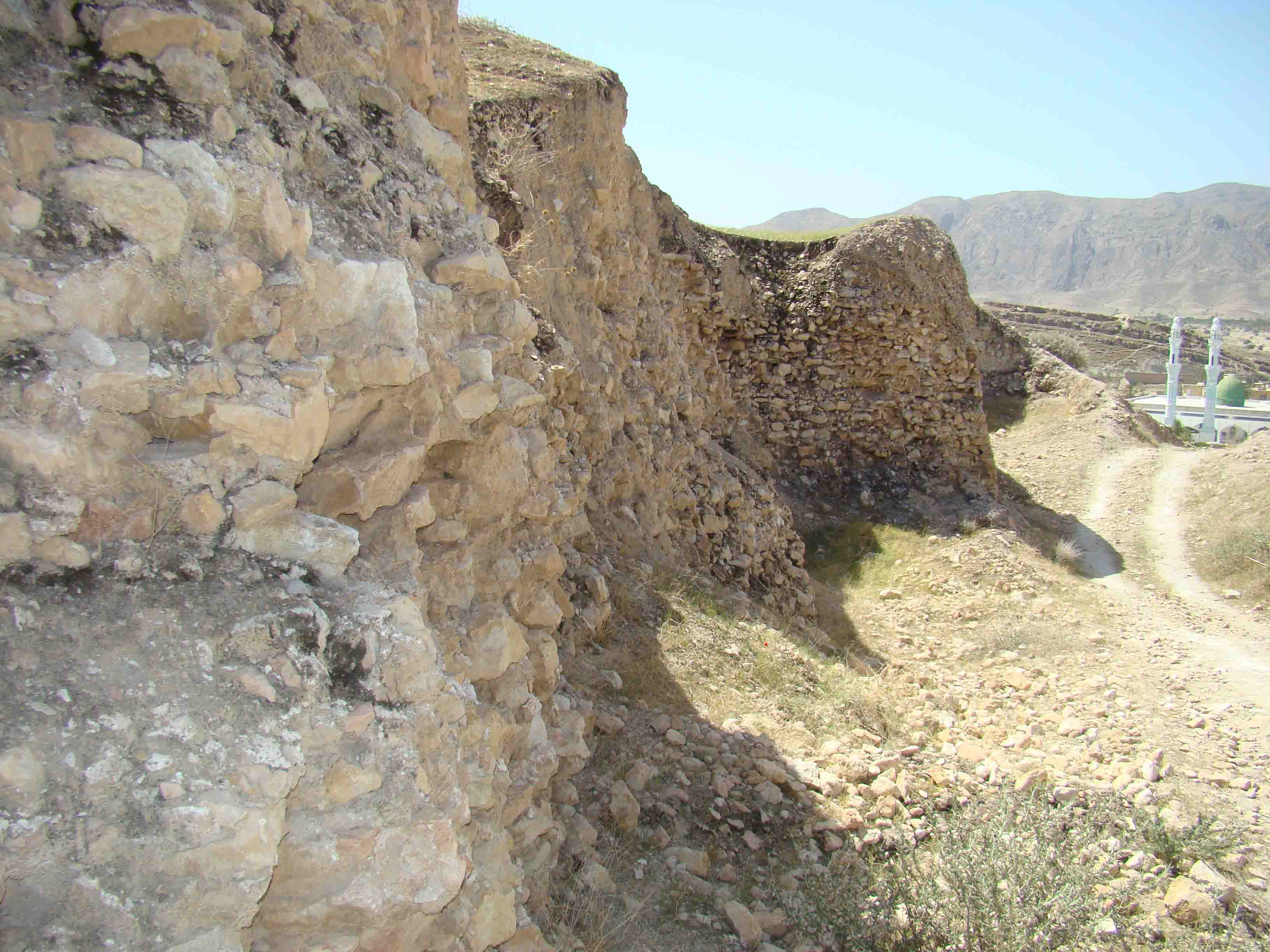
Shah Neshin castle

Shah Neshin castle (Persian: قلعه شاه‌نشین) is a historical castle located in Larestan County in Fars province, The longevity of this fortress dates back to the Sasanian Empire.
