= Hormud-e Mehr Khui =

Village in Fars province, Iran

Hormud-e Mehr Khui Persian: هرمود مهرخویی
- Village
- Location within Iran
- Coordinates: 27°31′49″N 54°58′55″E
- Country: Iran
- Province: Fars
- County: Larestan
- District: Central
- Rural District: Howmeh

Population (2016)
  - Total: 1,597
- Time zone: UTC+3:30 (IRST)

Hormud-e Mehr Khui (Persian: هرمود مهرخویی) (Note: Also romanized as Hormoud-e Mehr Khoui and Hormoud-e Mehr Khui; also known as Harmood, Hormoz, Hormūd, Hormūd-e Mehr Khūye, Hormūd-e Mer Khū, Ḩormūd-e Mīr Khū, and Hormuz) is a village in, and the capital of, Howmeh Rural District of the Central District of Larestan County, (Note: Formerly Lar County) Fars province, Iran. The previous capital of the rural district was the village of Latifi, now a city.

== Demographics ==
=== Population ===
At the time of the 2006 National Census, the village's population was 1,567 in 335 households. The following census in 2011 counted 1,582 people in 365 households. The 2016 census measured the population of the village as 1,597 people in 440 households.
