= Iwaz =

Iwaz may refer to:

- Eihwaz, proto-Germanic word for Yew
- ‘Iwaz, alternate name of Evaz, a city in Iran
