= Bid Shahr =

City in Fars province, Iran

Bid Shahr Persian: بيدشهر
- City
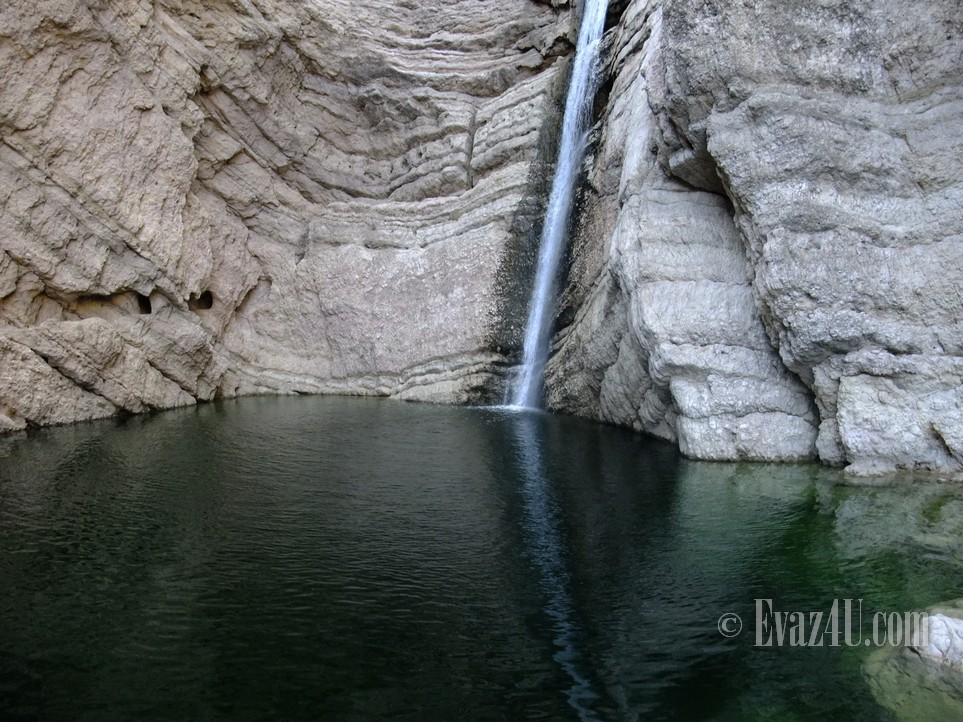

- Location within Iran
- Coordinates: 27°58′54″N 53°44′28″E
- Country: Iran
- Province: Fars
- County: Evaz
- District: Bid Shahr

Population (2016)
  - Total: 4,447
- Time zone: UTC+3:30 (IRST)
- Area code: 0715253

Bid Shahr (Persian: بيدشهر) (Note: Also romanized as Bīd Shahr) is a city in Bid Shahr District of Evaz County, Fars province, Iran.

== Demographics ==
=== Language and ethnicity ===
The residents refer to themselves as Khodmooni and their language is Achomi.

=== Population ===
At the time of the 2006 National Census, Bid Shahr's population was 3,872 in 709 households, when it was a village in Bid Shahr Rural District of the former Evaz District of Larestan County. (Note: Formerly Lar County) The following census in 2011 counted 4,372 people in 1,040 households. The 2016 census measured the population of the village as 4,447 people in 1,271 households. It was the most populous village in its rural district.

In 2018, the district was separated from the county in the establishment of Evaz County, and the rural district was transferred to the new Bid Shahr District. Bid Shahr was elevated to the status of a city.
