= Chah Nahr =

Village in Fars province, Iran

Chah Nahr Persian: چاه نهر
- Village
- Location within Iran
- Coordinates: 28°02′00″N 55°02′51″E
- Country: Iran
- Province: Fars
- County: Larestan
- District: Central
- Rural District: Darz and Sayeban

Population (2016)
  - Total: 1,590
- Time zone: UTC+3:30 (IRST)

Chah Nahr (Persian: چاه نهر) (Note: Also romanized as Chāh Nahr and Chāh-e Nahr; also known as Chāh Nar) is a village in Darz and Sayeban Rural District of the Central District of Larestan County, (Note: Formerly Lar County) Fars province, Iran.

== Demographics ==
=== Population ===
At the time of the 2006 National Census, the village's population was 1,137 in 244 households. The following census in 2011 counted 1,506 people in 379 households. The 2016 census measured the population of the village as 1,590 people in 390 households. It was the most populous village in its rural district.
