= Beyram, Iran =

City in Fars province, Iran

Beyram Persian: بيرم
- City
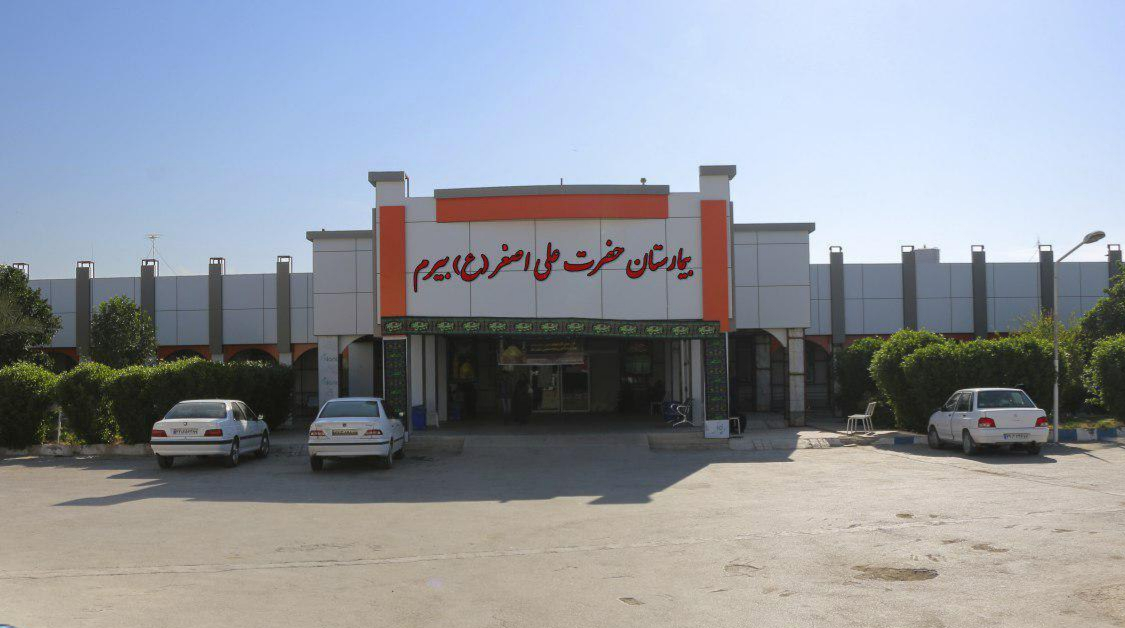
- Beyram Aliasghar hospital
- Nickname: Beyram
- Location within Iran
- Coordinates: 27°26′02″N 53°30′44″E
- Country: Iran
- Province: Fars
- County: Larestan
- District: Beyram

Population (2016)
  - Total: 7,300
- Time zone: UTC+3:30 (IRST)

Beyram (Persian: بيرم) (Note: Also romanized as Bairam) is a city in, and the capital of, Beyram District of Larestan County, (Note: Formerly Lar County) Fars province, Iran. It also serves as the administrative center for Beyram Rural District.

== History ==
In November 2008, the district was separated from the county in the establishment of Gerash County; however, six months later, the district was returned to Larestan County.

== Demographics ==
=== Population ===
At the time of the 2006 National Census, the city's population was 6,520 in 1,469 households. The following census in 2011 counted 7,379 people in 1,851 households. The 2016 census measured the population of the city as 7,300 people in 2,125 households.
