= Latifi, Iran =

City in Fars province, Iran

Latifi Persian: لطیفی
- City
- Location within Iran
- Coordinates: 27°41′26″N 54°23′08″E
- Country: Iran
- Province: Fars
- County: Larestan
- District: Central

Population (2016)
  - Total: 7,300
- Time zone: UTC+3:30 (IRST)

Latifi (Persian: لطيفي) (Note: Also romanized as Laţīfī) is a city in the Central District of Larestan County, (Note: Formerly Lar County) Fars province, Iran. As a village, Latifi was the capital of Howmeh Rural District until its capital was transferred to the village of Hormud-e Mehr Khui.

== Demographics ==
=== Population ===
At the time of the 2005 National Census, Latifi's population was 5,731 in 1,184 households, when it was a village in Howmeh Rural District. The following census in 2011 counted 6,669 people in 1,571 households, by which time the village had been elevated to the status of a city The 2016 census measured the population of the city as 7,300 people in 1,915 households.
