= Zaravan, Fars =

Zaravan زروان
- Village
- Location within Iran
- Coordinates: 27°30′41″N 54°11′45″E
- Country: Iran
- Province: Fars
- County: Larestan
- Bakhsh: Sahray-ye Bagh
- Rural District: Sahray-ye Bagh

Population (2006)
  - Total: 1,063
- Time zone: UTC+3:30 (IRST)
  - Summer (DST): UTC+4:30 (IRDT)

Zaravan (Persian: زروان, also Romanized as Zaravān, Zarun, and Zarvān) is a village in Sahray-ye Bagh Rural District, Sahray-ye Bagh District, Larestan County, Fars province, Iran. At the 2006 census, its population was 1,063, in 239 families.
