= Khur, Fars =

City in Fars province, Iran

Khur Persian: خور
- City
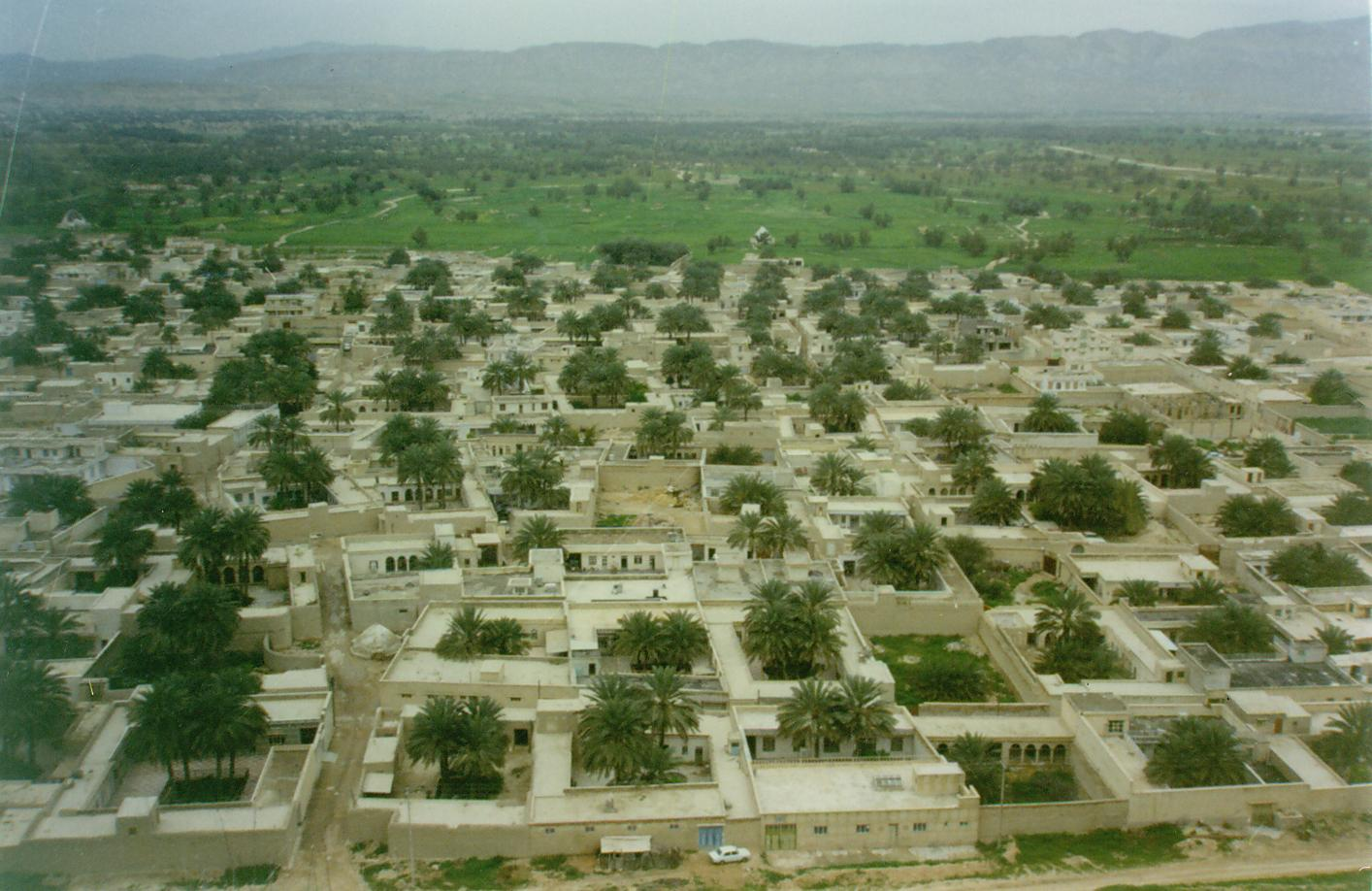

- Location within Iran
- Coordinates: 27°38′45″N 54°20′39″E
- Country: Iran
- Province: Fars
- County: Larestan
- District: Central

Population (2016)
  - Total: 7,338
- Time zone: UTC+3:30 (IRST)

Khur (Persian: خور) (Note: Also romanized as Khoor, Khūr, and Khvor) is a city in the Central District of Larestan County, (Note: Formerly Lar County) Fars province, Iran.

== Demographics ==
=== Language and ethnicity ===
The people of Khur speak Khuri (a local language also called "Achomi") and Persian.

=== Population ===
At the 2006 National Census, the city's population was 6,370 in 1,360 households. The following census in 2011 counted 6,821 people in 1,470 households. The 2016 census noted the population of the city as 7,338 people in 1,829 households.

Males constitute 50% of the population and females 50%. Khur has an average literacy rate of 70%, higher than the national average of 59.5%: male literacy is 78%, and female literacy is 62%. In Khur, 13% of the population is under 6 years of age. In term of religion, 100% percent of people are Sunni Muslims. Most of the men are either self-employed or employees in Gulf countries such as the United Arab Emirates, Qatar and so on. Additionally, 10% to 20% of them are local in UAE and Qatar, some never having seen their hometown at all, using Khuri in their family names. Some are working for government and some are wealthy enough to have major businesses.

== Geography ==
=== Location ===
Khur is a 400-year-old city located in southern part of Fars province. The city is 300 km away from Shiraz.

=== Climate ===
It has hot and dry weather during summer and cold dry during winter. In order to have rain specially during summer which starts at the second month of summer as it is known as chel pasini ("forty afternoons").
