= Hormizd =

Hormizd (sometimes spelled Hormuzd and Graecized Hormisdas or Ormisdas) is an Iranian name derived from the name of the god Ahura Mazda. It may refer to:

Any of the several kings and members of the Sasanian dynasty of Persia:

- Hormizd I (272–273), Sasanian king
- Hormizd II (302–310), Sasanian king
- Hormizd III (457–459), Sasanian king
- Hormizd IV (579–590), Sasanian king
- Hormizd V (593), Sasanian king
- Hormizd VI (631–632), Sasanian king
- Hormozd (Sassanian general) (633)
- Hormizd (son of Hormizd II) (fl. 323–363), defected and fled to Constantinople
- Hormizd of Sakastan, Sasanian prince
- Hormizd I Kushanshah (270–295), ruler of the east of the Sasanian empire
- Hormizd II Kushanshah (295–300), ruler of the east of the Sasanian empire

Other people with the name Hormizd or Hormisdas:

- Pope Hormisdas (c. 450 – 523), bishop of Rome
- Hormizd the Martyr (d. c. 420), saint
- Rabban Hormizd, 7th century Persian saint
- Yohannan Hormizd (1760–1838), Patriarch of the Chaldean Catholic Church
- Hormuzd Rassam (1826–1910), Assyrian assyriologist
- Hormazd Narielwalla (born 1979), Indian-born collage artist
- Hormasji Maneckji Seervai (1906–1996), Indian lawyer
- Hormasji Kanga (1880–1945), Indian cricketer
- Hormasji Vajifdar (1894–1961), Indian cricketer
- Hormusjee Naorojee Mody (1838–1911), Indian businessman in Hong Kong
- Naval Hormusji Tata (1904–1989), Indian businessman
- Noshir Hormasji Antia (1922–2007), Indian plastic surgeon
- Sam Hormusji Framji Jamshedji Manekshaw (1914–2008), Field Marshal of the Indian Army

Other uses:

- Rabban Hormizd Monastery, an ancient monastery in Iraq
- Mar Hormiz Syro-Malabar Catholic Church, Angamaly
- Boukoleon Palace in Constantinople, sometimes called the Hormisdas Palace after the son of Hormizd II
- Khurdad (son of Hurmuzd-Afarid), Persian student in Constantinople

== See also ==
- Hormuz (disambiguation)
- Hurmuz (disambiguation)
