= Hormud =

Coordinates: 27.5025°N 54.2839°E

Hormud —Harmood هرمود
- Interactive map of Hormud —Harmood
- Country: Iran
- Province: Fars
- County: Larestan
- Sahray-ye Bagh: Sahray-ye Bagh
- Time zone: UTC+3:30 (IRST)
  - Summer (DST): UTC+4:30 (IRDT)

Hormud (Persian: هرمود, also Romanized as Hormūd, Harmood, and Harmud; also known as Hormoz, Hormūd-e Bāgh, and Hormuz) is a village in Sahray-ye Bagh Rural District, Sahray-ye Bagh District, Larestan County, Fars province, Iran. At the 2006 census, its population was 563, in 121 families.
