= Beyram Rural District =

Rural district in Fars province, Iran

Beyram Rural District Persian: دهستان بيرم
- Rural District
- Location within Iran
- Coordinates: 27°30′08″N 53°30′47″E
- Country: Iran
- Province: Fars
- County: Larestan
- District: Beyram
- Capital: Beyram

Population (2016)
  - Total: 270
- Time zone: UTC+3:30 (IRST)

Beyram Rural District (Persian: دهستان بيرم) is in Beyram District of Larestan County, (Note: Formerly Lar County) Fars province, Iran. It is administered from the city of Beyram.

== History ==
In November 2008, the district was separated from the county in the establishment of Gerash County; however, six months later, the district was returned to Larestan County.

== Demographics ==
=== Population ===
At the time of the 2006 National Census, the rural district's population was 656 in 124 households. There were 347 inhabitants in 84 households at the following census of 2011. The 2016 census measured the population of the rural district as 270 in 85 households. The most populous of its eight villages was Aliabad-e Owkoshi, with 173 people.
