= Hurmuz =

Hurmuz may refer to:

- Urmuz (1883–1923), Romanian writer, lawyer and civil servant
- Ahura Mazda, the principal God and god of the sky in Zoroastrianism
- The Kingdom of Ormus

== See also ==
- Hormizd (disambiguation)
- Hormuz (disambiguation)
