= Baladeh Rural District =

Baladeh Rural District or Bala Deh Rural District (Persian: دهستان بلده) may refer to:

- Bala Deh Rural District (Larestan County)
- Baladeh Rural District (Tonekabon County)
