= Emadshahr =

City in Fars province, Iran

Emadshahr Persian: عمادشهر
- City
- Location within Iran
- Coordinates: 27°26′46″N 53°51′45″E
- Country: Iran
- Province: Fars
- County: Larestan
- District: Sahray-ye Bagh

Population (2016)
  - Total: 4,235
- Time zone: UTC+3:30 (IRST)

Emadshahr (Persian: عمادشهر) (Note: Formerly the village of Emad Deh (عمادده); also known as Maideh) is a city in, and the capital of, Sahray-ye Bagh District of Larestan County, (Note: Formerly Lar County) Fars province, Iran. As the village of Emad Deh, it was the capital of Emad Deh Rural District until its capital was transferred to the village of Didehban.

== Demographics ==
=== Population ===
At the time of the 2006 National Census, the population was 4,219 in 868 households, when it was a village in Emad Deh Rural District. The following census in 2011 counted 4,506 people in 926 households, by which time the village had been elevated to the status of a city and renamed Emadshahr. The 2016 census measured the population of the city as 4,235 people in 1,016 households.

== Overview ==
Emadshahr's geographical area is characterized by dry mountains, most notably Kuh-e Gobbast-ya a mountain standing over 2000 meters tall, which separates Emadshahr from the village of Kal.

It has greater resources than other cities in the area due to having many progeny who live in the richer Gulf Arab States. One such benefactor built a hospital in Emadshahr, the only one in the area for at least 50 km. Others have served in high-level governmental positions in both Emirates and Qatar where the cities' expatriates have adopted an Arab family surname.
