= Fishvar Rural District =

Rural district in Fars province, Iran

Fishvar Rural District Persian: دهستان فيشور
- Rural District
- Location within Iran
- Coordinates: 27°48′32″N 53°41′32″E
- Country: Iran
- Province: Fars
- County: Evaz
- District: Central
- Capital: Fishvar

Population (2016)
  - Total: 5,883
- Time zone: UTC+3:30 (IRST)

Fishvar Rural District (Persian: دهستان فيشور) is in the Central District of Evaz County, Fars province, Iran. Its capital is the village of Fishvar.

== Demographics ==
=== Population ===
At the time of the 2006 National Census, the rural district's population (as a part of the former Evaz District of Larestan County) (Note: Formerly Lar County) was 5,920 in 1,046 households. There were 6,964 inhabitants in 1,690 households at the following census of 2011. The 2016 census measured the population of the rural district as 5,883 in 1,584 households. The most populous of its nine villages was Fishvar, with 5,395 people.

In 2018, the district was separated from the county in the establishment of Evaz County, and the rural district was transferred to the new Central District.
