= Central District (Evaz County) =

District in Fars province, Iran

Central District (Evaz County) Persian: بخش مرکزی شهرستان اوز
- District
- Location within Iran
- Coordinates: 27°50′06″N 53°52′33″E
- Country: Iran
- Province: Fars
- County: Evaz
- Capital: Evaz
- Time zone: UTC+3:30 (IRST)

The Central District of Evaz County (Persian: بخش مرکزی شهرستان اوز) is in Fars province, Iran. Its capital is the city of Evaz, whose population at the time of the 2016 National Census was 19,987 in 5,273 households.

== History ==
In 2018, Evaz District was separated from Larestan County (Note: Formerly Lar County) in the establishment of Evaz County, which was divided into two districts of two rural districts each, with Evaz as its capital.

== Demographics ==
=== Administrative divisions ===
Central District (Evaz County)
Administrative Divisions
Evaz RD
Fishvar RD
Evaz (city)
RD = Rural District
