= Esta Noche =

Esta Noche may refer to:

- Esta Noche (gay bar), in San Francisco, California, 1979-1997
- "Esta Noche" (song), a song by Raulín Rodríguez
- "Esta Noche", a song by Azealia Banks
- "Esta Noche", a song by Alejandra Guzmán from A + No Poder
- Esta Noche, TVE programme with Carmen Maura 1981-1982
