= Birak-e Olya =

Birak-e Olya بيرك عليا
- Village
- Location within Iran
- Coordinates: 36°59′42″N 58°10′47″E
- Country: Iran
- Province: North Khorasan
- County: Faruj
- Bakhsh: Central
- Rural District: Sangar

Population (2006)
  - Total: 367
- Time zone: UTC+3:30 (IRST)
  - Summer (DST): UTC+4:30 (IRDT)

Birak-e Olya (Persian: بيرك عليا, also Romanized as Bīrak-e ‘Olyā; also known as Bīraq-e ‘Olyā, Bīraq-e Bālā and Bīrak-e Bālā) is a village in Sangar Rural District, in the Central District of Faruj County, North Khorasan Province, Iran. At the 2006 census, its population was 367, in 96 families.
