= Zarvan, Kurdistan =

Zarvan زروان
- Village
- Location within Iran
- Coordinates: 35°05′51″N 47°00′27″E
- Country: Iran
- Province: Kurdistan
- County: Sanandaj
- Bakhsh: Central
- Rural District: Naran

Population (2006)
  - Total: 106
- Time zone: UTC+3:30 (IRST)
  - Summer (DST): UTC+4:30 (IRDT)

Zarvan (Persian: زروان, also Romanized as Zarvān and Zarwān) is a village in the Naran Rural District of the Central District of Sanandaj County, Kurdistan Province, Iran. At the 2006 census, its population was 106, living in 23 families. The village is primarily populated by Kurds.
