= Mohammad Qasem =

Mohammad Qasem محمدقاسم
- Village
- Location within Iran
- Coordinates: 31°02′21″N 61°45′00″E
- Country: Iran
- Province: Sistan and Baluchestan
- County: Hirmand
- Bakhsh: Central
- Rural District: Jahanabad

Population (2006)
  - Total: 678
- Time zone: UTC+3:30 (IRST)
  - Summer (DST): UTC+4:30 (IRDT)

Mohammad Qasem (Persian: محمlدقاسم, also Romanized as Moḩammad Qāsem; also known as Deh-e Moḩammad Qāsem) is a village in Jahanabad Rural District, in the Central District of Hirmand County, Sistan and Baluchestan Province, Iran. At the 2006 census, its population was 678, in 108 families.
