= Qalat Rural District =

Rural district in Fars province, Iran

Qalat Rural District Persian: دهستان قلات
- Rural District
- Location within Iran
- Coordinates: 27°56′23″N 53°53′18″E
- Country: Iran
- Province: Fars
- County: Evaz
- District: Bid Shahr
- Capital: Qalat
- Time zone: UTC+3:30 (IRST)

Qalat Rural District (Persian: دهستان قلات) is in Bid Shahr District of Evaz County, Fars province, Iran. Its capital is the village of Qalat, whose population at the time of the 2016 National Census was 872 in 228 households.

== History ==
In 2018, Evaz District was separated from Larestan County (Note: Formerly Lar County) in the establishment of Evaz County, and Qalat Rural District was created in the new Bid Shahr District.
