= Aveh, Qazvin =

Aveh اوه
- Village
- Location within Iran
- Coordinates: 36°21′07″N 50°36′40″E
- Country: Iran
- Province: Qazvin
- County: Qazvin
- Bakhsh: Rudbar-e Alamut
- Rural District: Alamut-e Bala

Population (2006)
  - Total: 139
- Time zone: UTC+3:30 (IRST)
  - Summer (DST): UTC+4:30 (IRDT)

Aveh (Persian: اوه, also Romanized as Āveh) is a village in Alamut-e Bala Rural District, Rudbar-e Alamut District, Qazvin County, Qazvin Province, Iran. At the 2006 census, its population was 139, in 50 families.
