= Bala Deh, Afghanistan =

Bala Deh
- Village
- Location in Afghanistan
- Coordinates: 33°59′56″N 69°12′43″E
- Country: Afghanistan
- Province: Paktia Province
- District: Gardez District
- Time zone: + 4.30

Bala Deh (Pashto: بالاده) is a large village in Gardez District, Paktia Province, in eastern Afghanistan. The village lies roughly 50 kilometres north of Gardez and 12-15 kilometres east of Pul-i-Alam. It is connected to Pul-i-Alam by a dirt road and then the main road leads down from Pul-i Alam to Gardez.

A notable archaeological site lies in the vicinity, known as the "four arches (chahar tag) of Jireh". An ancient fort named Ghur-Duz, now a ruin, is reported to lie six miles to the south of Bala Deh.

Balah Deh is reportedly home to around 1000 inhabitants. Residents of the village faced acute water shortages in 2005 due to a technical fault in the water supply system.

A fictional nuclear facility near Bala Deh is prominently featured in the novel Eve of Destruction by Barry Broad.

== See also ==
- Paktia Province
