= Evaz =

City in Fars province, Iran

Evaz Persian: اوز
- City
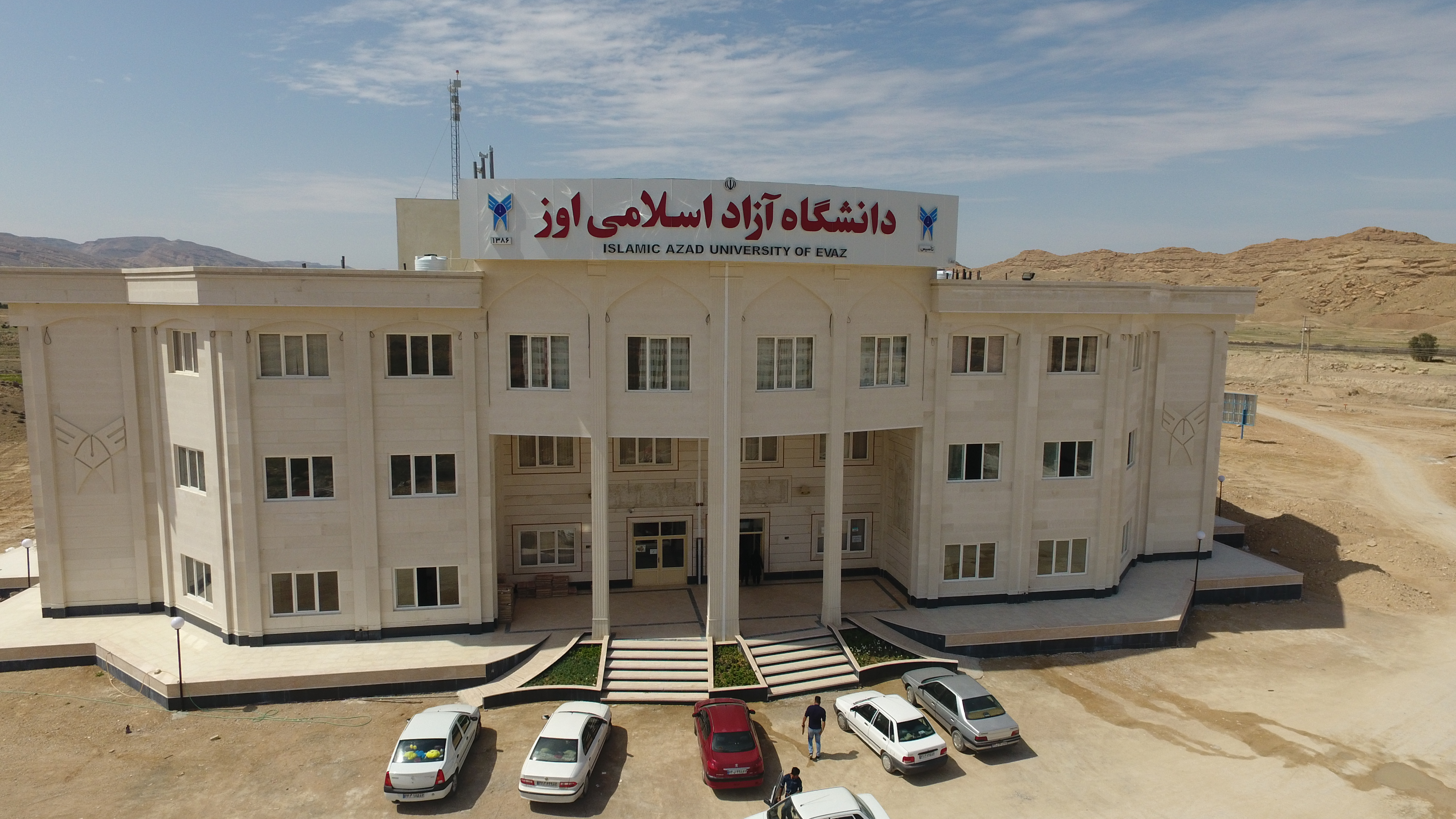

- Location within Iran
- Coordinates: 27°45′36″N 54°00′24″E
- Country: Iran
- Province: Fars
- County: Evaz
- District: Central

Government
  - Mayor: Masoud Keramati
- Elevation: 950 m (3,120 ft)

Population (2016)
  - Total: 19,987
- Time zone: UTC+3:30 (IRST)
- Postal code: 74331
- Area code: 071-5251

Evaz (Persian: اوز) (Note: Also romanized as Avaz and ‘Ewaz; also known as Awadh and Evazeh) (Arabic: عوض) is a city in the Central District of Evaz County, Fars province, Iran, serving as capital of both the county and the district. The people of Evaz are Khodmooni with mixed origins and are mostly Sunni Muslims. The people of Evaz speak Evazi, which is a dialect of Farsi.

Some of the people of Evaz and the broader Khodmooni people region have migrated to the gulf states including Kuwait, Bahrain, and Dubai.

== Demographics ==
=== Ethnicity ===
The Evazi people consider themselves and their traditions to be "Khodmooni," which literally translates to "of our own" in Persian and Larestani dialects. This term is often seen as a way for the Evazi (Larestani) ethnic group to distinguish themselves from other Iranians. Evazi Larestani are of mixed origins that have become a unique ethnic group.

=== Genetics ===
YDNA results of 46 Evazi samples in FamilytreeDNA has shown that 4 evazi samples belong to haplogroup E-M35 (8.7%), 12 samples belong to haplogroup G-M201 (26.1%) all of them are within G1 haplogroup, 14 samples belong to haplogroup J-M172 (J2) (30.4%), 1 sample belong to haplogroup L (2.2%), 5 samples belong to haplogroup R1a (10.8%), 7 samples belong to haplogroup R1b-M269 (15.2%) and all of these samples belong to R-PH4902 branch and 3 samples belong to haplogroup R2a (6.5%).

=== Language ===
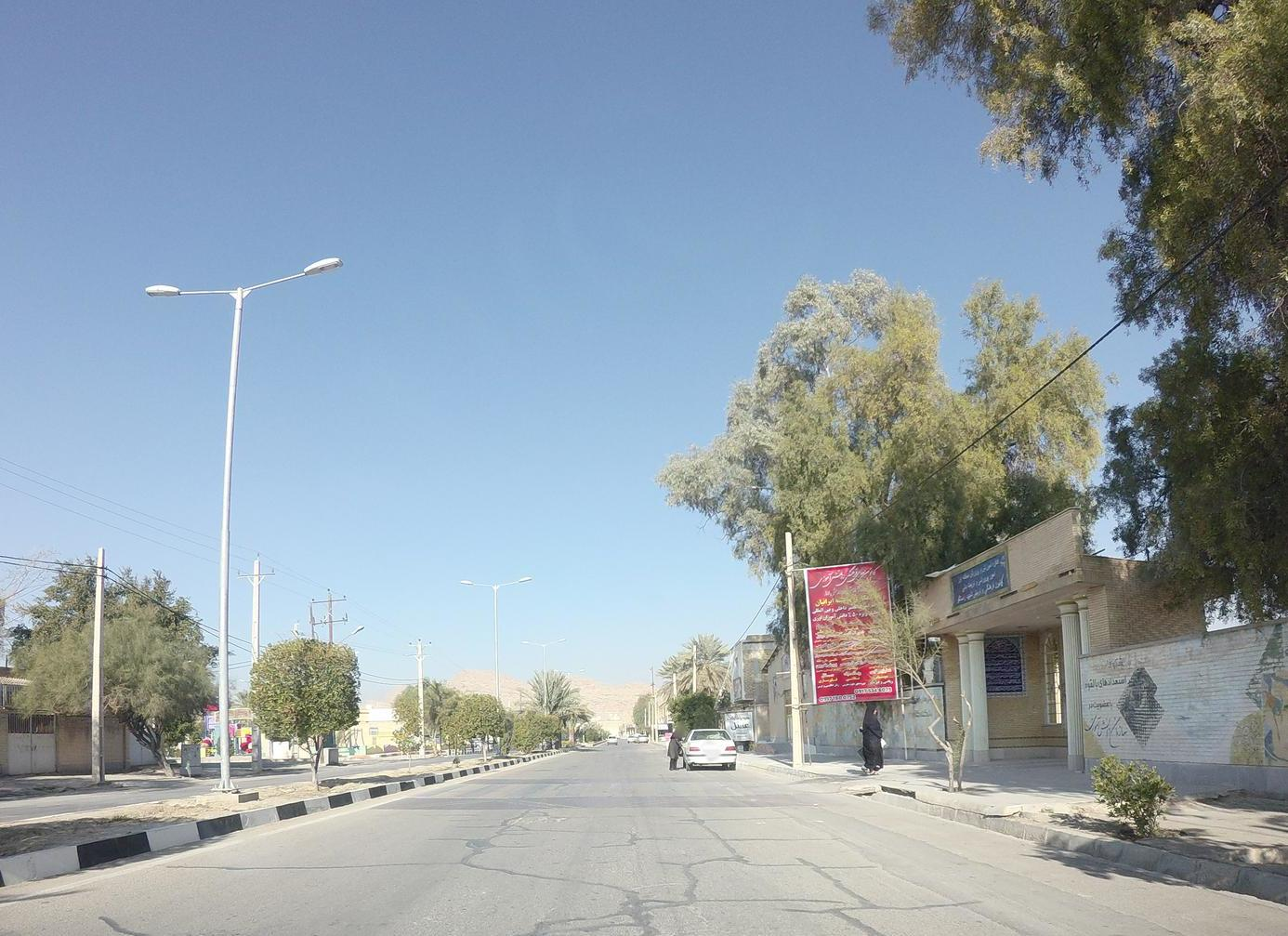
Along Seifaei (Imam Khomeini) Blvd in Evaz.

The spoken language of Evaz is a dialect form of Achomi vernacular to Evazi, which is distinct from a language with the influence of other languages making up the mix of Achomee or Larestani ethnic. It is also maintained by some that it is sister to New Persian though it is difficult to verify this claim since the grammatical structure of Evazi Achomi language is different from its Persian counterpart, though many common vocabularies exist in both. The word "Achomi" is used by Persian Gulf Arab citizens of Larestani ethnicity.

Evazi language is a form of the ancient Persian language. Compared to the other present day Iranian languages, it has the fewest Arabic or other foreign languages.

Today, Evazi as a mother tongue is being increasingly abandoned by the younger generation in favour of Persian, Arabic or English. Among the Evazis who have migrated to other countries, many still speak the Evazi dialect at home. However, the large majority of migrants from previous generations have adopted their new domicile's language as either a first or second language. In many cases, the cultural roots of those whose families have migrated several decades ago have been eroded and replaced by the new language of necessity. The most prominent example of this is a large number of Arab nationals of the Cooperation Council for the Arab States of the Gulf (especially in Bahrain, U.A.E. and Qatar) with Evazi (Larestani) roots that have for the most part replaced Evazi with Arabic over the years.

Except for 1% or 2% of Evazis of African ethnicity whose ancestors were brought to Evaz for domestic work (To editors: This phrase was part of my sentence and has been incorrectly edited by the previous member), like the rest of the fellow Larestani Ethnic, they are a mix of Arab, Afghan, Baluch, Lur, Persian due to the consecutive migratory interactions as well as invasions which have occurred within the region of Larestan.

Except for 1% or 2% of the Evazis of African ethnicity whose ancestors were brought to Evaz for domestic work, the rest of Evazis are of Persian ethnicity.

=== Religion ===
As opposed to most other parts of Iran, Sunni Islam is the dominant religion in Evaz.

=== Population ===
At the time of the 2006 National Census, the city's population was 14,315 in 3,297 households, when it was the capital of the former Evaz District of Larestan County. (Note: Formerly Lar County) The following census in 2011 counted 22,401 people in 4,810 households. The 2016 census measured the population of the city as 19,987 people in 5,273 households. Evaz is one of the fastest-growing cities in the region due in large part to a number of Evazi individuals who provide financial support for the development of robust academic infrastructure.

In 2018, the district was separated from the county in the establishment of Evaz County, and Evaz was transferred to the new Central District as the county's capital.

=== Diaspora ===
Due to a history of mass migration, the precise number of Evazis in the world is difficult to determine at this stage. Many have migrated to other countries, majority of whom to the Arab states of the Persian Gulf (due to the close proximity and cultural ties), some have moved to Europe in countries such as Sweden and more recently to the US and Canada have also hosted significant migration. It has been estimated that approximately 7,000 are outside Evaz but in Iran. It is estimated that at least half a million of Larestanis people of which about 50,000 are of Evazi origin are estimated to live in Arab States of the Persian Gulf.

== Geography ==
=== Location ===
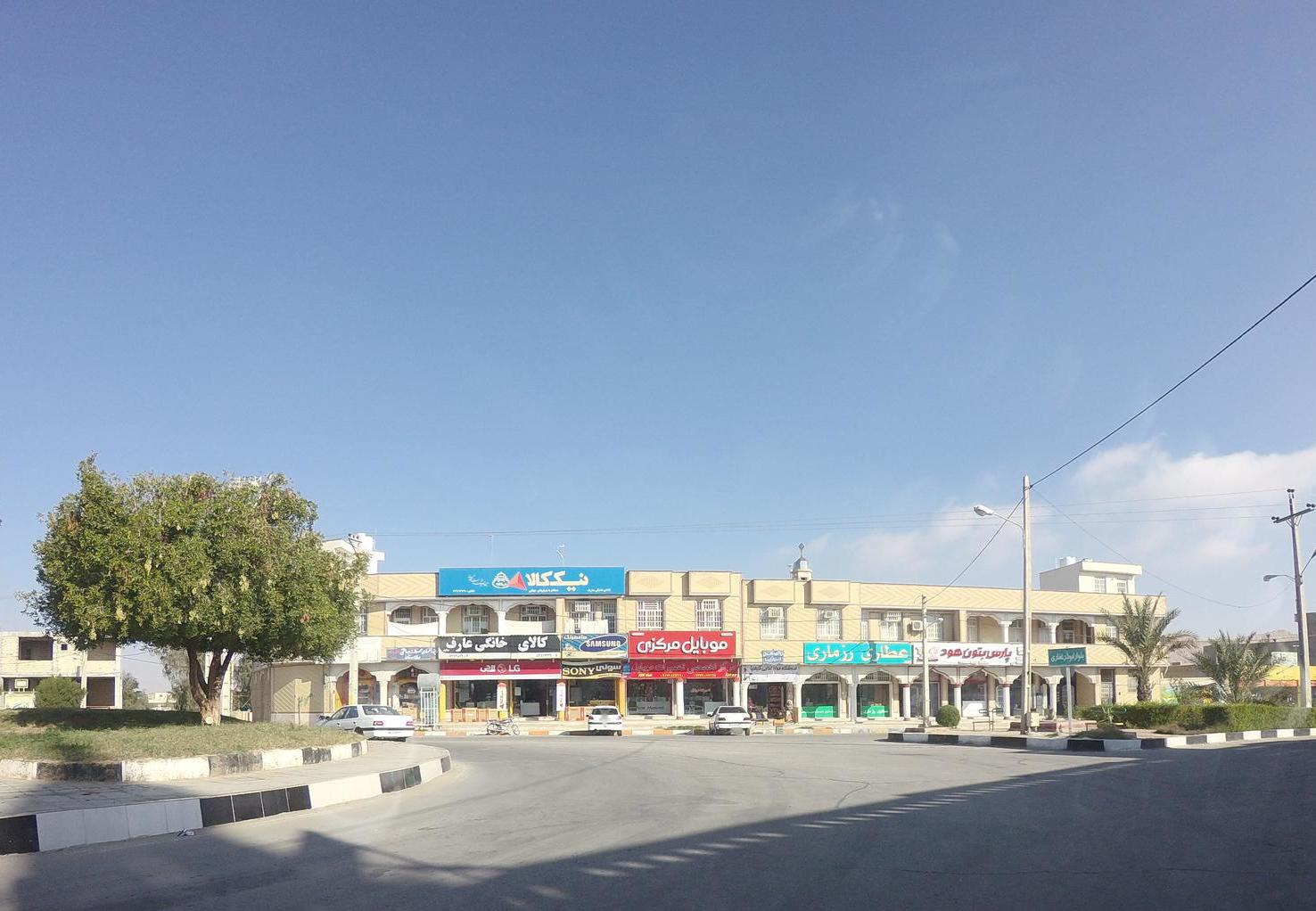
Commercial area in Evaz at the intersection of Abazar Blvd and Imam Khomeini Blvd.

The town of Evaz is located in the Fars province of Iran and about 370 kilometers southeast of Shiraz. Evaz is situated about 970 meters above sea level in a valley stretching approximately thirty kilometers in length and four kilometers in breadth with low mountains to the North and South.

=== Flora and Fauna ===
Truffles, an underground mushroom, is commonly found in the region.

=== Climate ===
Evaz receives minimal rainfall, estimated to be approximately 7.5 cm (3 inches) on average per year.

Summers are hot and dry with temperatures reaching as high as 46 °C during the day.

Winters are usually cold and similarly dry. Spring and autumn provide a more moderate and pleasant climate.

Temperatures usually drop at night time throughout the year due to being geographically situated in a valley.

Climate data for Evaz
| Month | Jan | Feb | Mar | Apr | May | Jun | Jul | Aug | Sep | Oct | Nov | Dec | Year |
|---|---|---|---|---|---|---|---|---|---|---|---|---|---|
| Mean daily maximum °C (°F) | 16.4 (61.5) | 19.1 (66.4) | 23.8 (74.8) | 29.9 (85.8) | 36.1 (97.0) | 39.7 (103.5) | 40.5 (104.9) | 39.5 (103.1) | 36.5 (97.7) | 31.4 (88.5) | 23.5 (74.3) | 18.7 (65.7) | 29.6 (85.3) |
| Daily mean °C (°F) | 11.6 (52.9) | 13.9 (57.0) | 18.2 (64.8) | 23.9 (75.0) | 29.9 (85.8) | 33.2 (91.8) | 34.2 (93.6) | 33.3 (91.9) | 30.4 (86.7) | 25.7 (78.3) | 18.3 (64.9) | 13.6 (56.5) | 23.8 (74.9) |
| Mean daily minimum °C (°F) | 6.3 (43.3) | 8.2 (46.8) | 12 (54) | 17.3 (63.1) | 22.9 (73.2) | 25.7 (78.3) | 27.3 (81.1) | 26.3 (79.3) | 23.6 (74.5) | 19.3 (66.7) | 12.7 (54.9) | 8.1 (46.6) | 17.5 (63.5) |
| Average precipitation mm (inches) | 44 (1.7) | 39 (1.5) | 42 (1.7) | 9 (0.4) | 1 (0.0) | 0 (0) | 2 (0.1) | 4 (0.2) | 0 (0) | 1 (0.0) | 11 (0.4) | 39 (1.5) | 192 (7.5) |
Source: Climate-data.org

== Education ==
=== Schools ===
Evaz is one of the few cities in Fars province to aggressively develop its academic infrastructure. In 2011, there were four kindergartens, ten elementary schools, eight secondary schools and six high schools in Evaz. It is well known that the people of Evaz have the highest rate of education per capita amongst their fellow Larestani counterparts.

=== Universities ===
Evaz houses a branch of Payame Noor University as well as the Islamic Azad University. Due to lack of financial resources and support in the region, several philanthropic families have privately provided financial aid for 'Payame Noor University' in an effort to create opportunities for residents.

== Culture ==
=== Holidays ===
Evazi people like most of the Larestanis celebrate the customary holidays and events observed by the GCC as well as the traditional Persian such as Mehrgan, Yalda, Tirgan except Nowruz as it is the traditional Persian new year calendar.

=== Weddings ===
Evazi weddings are festive occasions. Due to the volume of Evazi migration, weddings will vary depending on the conservatism of the host country and wedding attendees. Traditionally, the customs are closer to the weddings performed within the GCC countries due to the cultural heritage and closeness of the Larestani ethnic with the Arabs of GCC. Except for some Evazi weddings in the Persian Gulf Arab States, Evazi weddings follow the Islamic tradition (separation of sexes) with some influences of the Iranian heritage while hosting nation's customs overseas.

== See also ==
- Larestan
- Lar, Iran
- Gerash
- Fars province
- Kookherd
- Fishvar
- Bid Shahr
