= Bord Khun-e Kohneh =

Village in Bushehr province, Iran

Bord Khun-e Kohneh Persian: بردخون كهنه
- Village
- Location within Iran
- Coordinates: 28°01′51″N 51°27′29″E
- Country: Iran
- Province: Bushehr
- County: Deyr
- District: Bord Khun
- Rural District: Bord Khun

Population (2016)
  - Total: 826
- Time zone: UTC+3:30 (IRST)

Bord Khun-e Kohneh (Persian: بردخون كهنه) (Note: Also romanized as Bord Khūn-e Kohneh; also known as Bord Khūng-e Kohneh and Kahneh) is a village in Bord Khun Rural District of Bord Khun District in Deyr County, Bushehr province, Iran.

== Demographics ==
=== Population ===
At the time of the 2006 National Census, the village's population was 579 in 119 households. The following census in 2011 counted 644 people in 155 households. The 2016 census measured the population of the village as 826 people in 213 households. It was the most populous village in its rural district.
