= Dehkuyeh =

City in Fars province, Iran

Dahkuyeh Persian: دَهكويه
- City
- Location within Iran
- Coordinates: 27°51′16″N 54°25′26″E
- Country: Iran
- Province: Fars
- County: Larestan
- District: Central

Population (2016)
  - Total: 4,523
- Time zone: UTC+3:30 (IRST)

Dahkuyeh (Persian: دَهكويه) (Note: Also romanized as Dah Kooyeh, Dah Kūyeh, and Dahkūyeh; also known as Dahkūh) is a city in the Central District of Larestan County, (Note: Formerly Lar County) Fars province, Iran. As a village, it was the capital of Dahkuyeh Rural District until its capital was transferred to the village of Kurdeh.

== Demographics ==
=== Population ===
At the time of the 2006 National Census, Dehkuyeh's population was 3,560 in 803 households, when it was village in Dahkuyeh Rural District. The following census in 2011 counted 5,201 people in 1,154 households. The 2016 census measured the population of the village as 4,523 people in 1,307 households. It was the most populous village in its rural district.

In 2017, the village of Dehkuyeh was elevated to the status of a city.
