= Musaabad, Nahavand =

Musaabad موسي اباد
- Village
- Location within Iran
- Coordinates: 34°17′05″N 48°09′02″E
- Country: Iran
- Province: Hamadan
- County: Nahavand
- Bakhsh: Khezel
- Rural District: Solgi

Population (2006)
  - Total: 204
- Time zone: UTC+3:30 (IRST)
  - Summer (DST): UTC+4:30 (IRDT)

Musaabad (Persian: موسي اباد, also Romanized as Mūsáābād; also known as Bālā Deh) is a village in Solgi Rural District, Khezel District, Nahavand County, Hamadan Province, Iran. At the 2006 census, its population was 204, in 46 families.
