= Dehkuyeh Rural District =

Rural district in Fars province, Iran

Dehkuyeh Rural District Persian: دهستان دهكويه
- Rural District
- Location within Iran
- Coordinates: 27°53′07″N 54°21′06″E
- Country: Iran
- Province: Fars
- County: Larestan
- District: Central
- Capital: Kurdeh

Population (2016)
  - Total: 10,769
- Time zone: UTC+3:30 (IRST)

Dehkuyeh Rural District (Persian: دهستان دهكويه) is in the Central District of Larestan County, (Note: Formerly Lar County) Fars province, Iran. Its capital is the village of Kurdeh. The previous capital of the rural district was the village of Dehkuyeh, now a city.

== Demographics ==
=== Population ===
At the time of the 2006 National Census, the rural district's population was 9,169 in 2,045 households. There were 11,423 inhabitants in 2,670 households at the following census of 2011. The 2016 census measured the population of the rural district as 10,769 in 3,080 households. The most populous of its 11 villages was Dehkuyeh (now a city), with 4,523 people.
