= Bid Shahr District =

District in Fars province, Iran

Bid Shahr District Persian: بخش بیدشهر
- District
- Location within Iran
- Coordinates: 27°56′44″N 53°45′01″E
- Country: Iran
- Province: Fars
- County: Evaz
- Capital: Kureh
- Time zone: UTC+3:30 (IRST)

Bid Shahr District (Persian: بخش بیدشهر) is in Evaz County, Fars province, Iran. Its capital is the city of Kureh, whose population at the time of the 2016 National Census was 2,706 in 748 households.

== History ==
In 2018, Evaz District was separated from Larestan County (Note: Formerly Lar County) in the establishment of Evaz County, which was divided into two districts of two rural districts each, with the city of Evaz as its capital. The villages of Bid Shahr and Kureh were elevated to city status.

== Demographics ==
=== Administrative divisions ===
Bid Shahr District
Administrative Divisions
Bid Shahr RD
Qalat RD
Bid Shahr (city)
Kureh (city)
RD = Rural District
