= Bid Shahr Rural District =

Rural district in Fars province, Iran

Bid Shahr Rural District Persian: دهستان بیدشهر
- Rural District
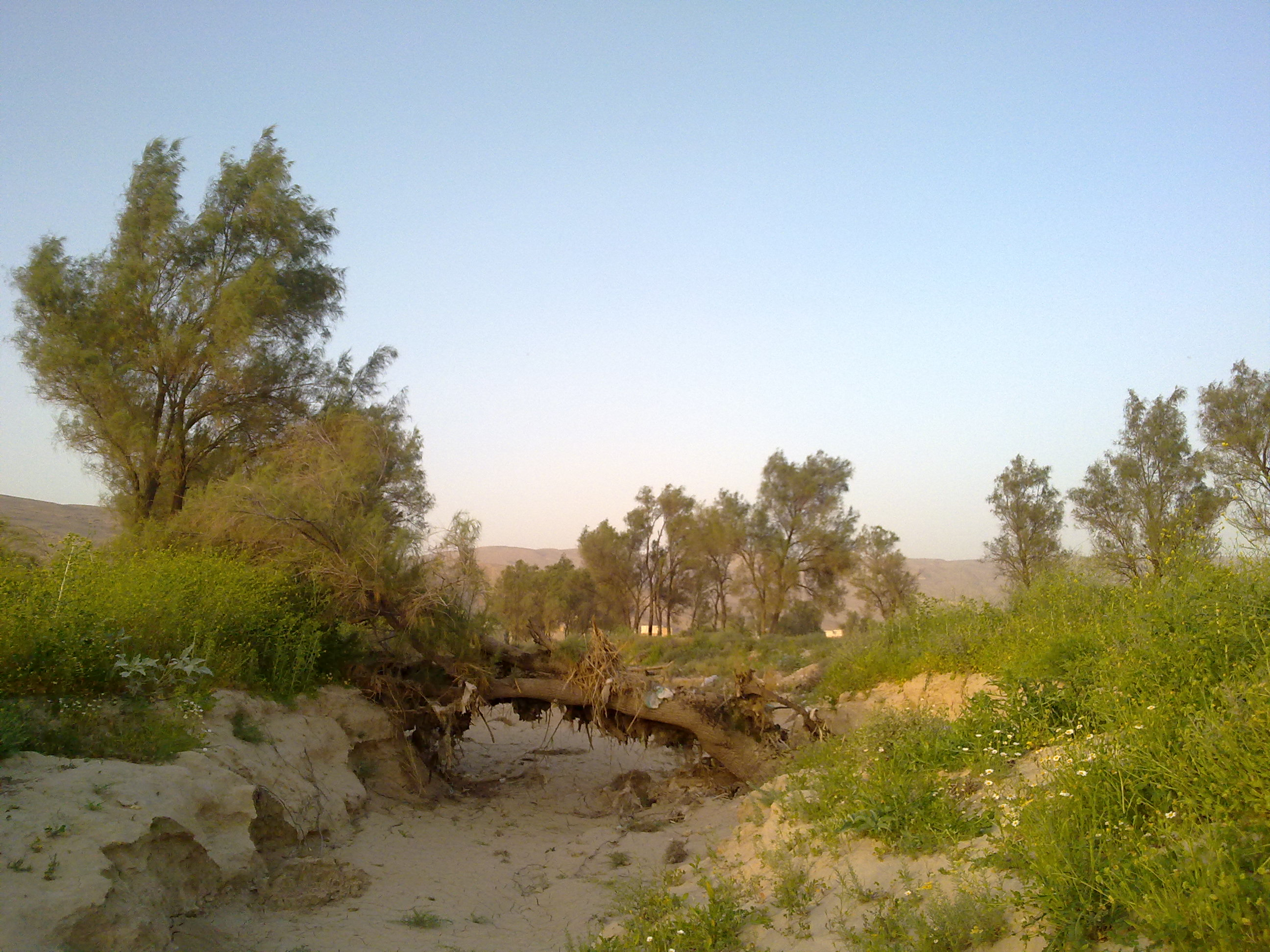

- Location within Iran
- Coordinates: 27°56′49″N 53°38′23″E
- Country: Iran
- Province: Fars
- County: Evaz
- District: Bid Shahr
- Capital: Hud

Population (2016)
  - Total: 14,861
- Time zone: UTC+3:30 (IRST)

Bid Shahr Rural District (Persian: دهستان بیدشهر) is in Bid Shahr District of Evaz County, Fars province, Iran. Its capital is the village of Hud. The previous capital of the rural district was the village of Kureh, now a city.

== Demographics ==
=== Population ===
At the time of the 2006 National Census, the rural district's population (as a part of the former Evaz District of Larestan County) (Note: Formerly Lar County) was 13,111 in 2,579 households. There were 16,387 inhabitants in 3,852 households at the following census of 2011. The 2016 census measured the population of the rural district as 14,861 in 4,083 households. The most populous of its 56 villages was Bid Shahr (now a city), with 4,447 people.

In 2018, the district was separated from the county in the establishment of Evaz County, and the rural district was transferred to the new Bid Shahr District.
