= Howmeh Rural District (Larestan County) =

Rural district in Fars province, Iran

Howmeh Rural District Persian: دهستان حومه
- Rural District
- Location within Iran
- Coordinates: 27°42′24″N 54°46′30″E
- Country: Iran
- Province: Fars
- County: Larestan
- District: Central
- Capital: Hormud-e Mehr Khui

Population (2016)
  - Total: 10,613
- Time zone: UTC+3:30 (IRST)

Howmeh Rural District (Persian: دهستان حومه) is in the Central District of Larestan County, (Note: Formerly Lar County) Fars province, Iran. Its capital is the village of Hormud-e Mehr Khui. The previous capital of the rural district was the village of Latifi, now a city.

== Demographics ==
=== Population ===
At the time of the 2006 National Census, the rural district's population was 14,629 in 3,135 households. There were 9,398 inhabitants in 2,286 households at the following census of 2011. The 2016 census measured the population of the rural district as 10,613 in 2,963 households. The most populous of its 64 villages was Berak, with 2,882 people.
