= Emad Deh Rural District =

Rural district in Fars province, Iran

Emad Deh Rural District Persian: دهستان عمادده
- Rural District
- Location within Iran
- Coordinates: 27°28′29″N 53°48′41″E
- Country: Iran
- Province: Fars
- County: Larestan
- District: Sahray-ye Bagh
- Capital: Didehban

Population (2016)
  - Total: 1,613
- Time zone: UTC+3:30 (IRST)

Emad Deh Rural District (Persian: دهستان عمادده) is in Sahray-ye Bagh District of Larestan County, (Note: Formerly Lar County) Fars province, Iran. Its capital is the village of Didehban. The previous capital of the rural district was the village of Emad Deh, now the city of Emadshahr.

== Demographics ==
=== Population ===
At the time of the 2006 National Census, the rural district's population was 6,813 in 1,415 households. There were 2,239 inhabitants in 531 households at the following census of 2011. The 2016 census measured the population of the rural district as 1,613 in 453 households. The most populous of its 17 villages was Didehban, with 779 people.
