= Evaz County =

County in Fars province, Iran

Evaz County Persian: شهرستان اوز
- County
- Location of Evaz County in Fars province (bottom, yellow)

- Location of Fars province in Iran
- Coordinates: 27°55′N 53°50′E
- Country: Iran
- Province: Fars
- Capital: Evaz
- Districts: Central, Bid Shahr
- Time zone: UTC+3:30 (IRST)

Evaz County (Persian: شهرستان اوز) is in Fars province, Iran. Its capital is the city of Evaz, whose population at the time of the 2016 National Census was 19,987 in 5,273 households.

== History ==
In 2018, Evaz District was separated from Larestan County (Note: Formerly Lar County) in the establishment of Evaz County, which was divided into two districts of two rural districts each, with Evaz as its capital. The villages of Bid Shahr and Kureh were elevated to city status.

== Demographics ==
=== Language ===
The language spoken in Evaz originates from the ancient Persian dialect called Achomi (Avazi). The majority of the people in Evaz follow the religion Islam Sunni despite being the minority in Iran who follow this belief.

=== Administrative divisions ===
Evaz County's administrative structure is shown in the following table.

Evaz County Population
Administrative Divisions
Central District
Evaz RD
Fishvar RD
Evaz (city)
Bid Shahr District
Bid Shahr RD
Qalat RD
Bid Shahr (city)
Kureh (city)
RD = Rural District

== See also ==
Media related to Evaz County at Wikimedia Commons
