= Sahray-ye Bagh District =

District in Fars province, Iran

Sahray-ye Bagh District Persian: بخش صحرای باغ
- District
- Location within Iran
- Coordinates: 27°29′07″N 54°00′47″E
- Country: Iran
- Province: Fars
- County: Larestan
- Capital: Emadshahr

Population (2016)
  - Total: 12,855
- Time zone: UTC+3:30 (IRST)

Sahray-ye Bagh District (Persian: بخش صحرای باغ) is in Larestan County, (Note: Formerly Lar County) Fars province, Iran. Its capital is the city of Emadshahr. (Note: Formerly the village of Emad Deh)

== History ==
After the 2006 National Census, the village of Emad Deh was elevated to the status of the city of Emadshahr.

== Demographics ==
=== Population ===
At the time of the 2006 census, the district's population was 13,389 in 2,833 households. The following census in 2011 counted 13,022 people in 2,928 households. The 2016 census measured the population of the rural district as 12,855 inhabitants in 3,327 households.

=== Administrative divisions ===
Sahray-ye Bagh District Population
Administrative Divisions	2006	2011	2016
Emad Deh RD	6,813	2,239	1,613
Sahray-ye Bagh RD	6,576	6,277	7,007
Emadshahr (city)		4,506	4,235
Total	13,389	13,022	12,855
RD = Rural District
