= Evaz District =

Former district in Fars province, Iran

Evaz District Persian: بخش اوز
- Former District
- Location within Iran
- Coordinates: 27°55′N 53°50′E
- Country: Iran
- Province: Fars
- County: Larestan
- Capital: Evaz

Population (2016)
  - Total: 40,731
- Time zone: UTC+3:30 (IRST)

Evaz District (Persian: بخش اوز) is a former administrative division of Larestan County, (Note: Formerly Lar County) Fars province, Iran. Its capital was the city of Evaz.

== History ==
In 2018, the district was separated from the county in the establishment of Evaz County.

== Demographics ==
=== Population ===
At the time of the 2006 National Census, the district's population was 33,346 in 6,922 households. The following census in 2011 counted 45,752 people in 10,352 households. The 2016 census measured the population of the district as 40,731 inhabitants in 10,940 households.

=== Administrative divisions ===
Evaz District Population
Administrative Divisions	2006	2011	2016
Bid Shahr RD	13,111	16,387	14,861
Fishvar RD	5,920	6,964	5,883
Evaz (city)	14,315	22,401	19,987
Total	33,346	45,752	40,731
RD = Rural District
