= Bala Deh Rural District (Larestan County) =

Rural district in Fars province, Iran

Bala Deh Rural District Persian: دهستان بالاده
- Rural District
- Location within Iran
- Coordinates: 27°22′53″N 53°36′07″E
- Country: Iran
- Province: Fars
- County: Larestan
- District: Beyram
- Capital: Bala Deh

Population (2016)
  - Total: 6,162
- Time zone: UTC+3:30 (IRST)

Bala Deh Rural District (Persian: دهستان بالاده) is in Beyram District of Larestan County, (Note: Formerly Lar County) Fars province, Iran. Its capital is the village of Bala Deh.

== History ==
In November 2008, the district was separated from the county in the establishment of Gerash County; however, six months later, the district was returned to Larestan County.

== Demographics ==
=== Population ===
At the time of the 2006 National Census, the rural district's population was 5,213 in 1,078 households. There were 6,402 inhabitants in 1,711 households at the following census of 2011. The 2016 census measured the population of the rural district as 6,162 in 1,900 households. The most populous of its 16 villages was Bala Deh, with 2,166 people.
