= Beyram District =

District in Fars province, Iran

Beyram District Persian: بخش بیرم
- District
- Location within Iran
- Coordinates: 27°27′01″N 53°34′08″E
- Country: Iran
- Province: Fars
- County: Larestan
- Capital: Beyram

Population (2016)
  - Total: 13,732
- Time zone: UTC+3:30 (IRST)

Beyram District (Persian: بخش بیرم) is in Larestan County, (Note: Formerly Lar County) Fars province, Iran. Its capital is the city of Beyram.

== History ==
In November 2008, the district was separated from the county in the establishment of Gerash County; however, six months later, the district was returned to Larestan County.

== Demographics ==
=== Population ===
At the time of the 2006 National Census, the district's population was 12,389 in 2,671 households. The following census in 2011 counted 14,128 people in 3,646 households. The 2016 census measured the population of the district as 13,732 inhabitants in 4,110 households.

=== Administrative divisions ===
Beyram District Population
Administrative Divisions	2006	2011	2016
Bala Deh RD	5,213	6,402	6,162
Beyram RD	656	347	270
Beyram (city)	6,520	7,379	7,300
Total	12,389	14,128	13,732
RD = Rural District
