= Darz and Sayeban Rural District =

Rural district in Fars province, Iran

Darz and Sayeban Rural District Persian: دهستان درز و سابيان
- Rural District
- Location within Iran
- Coordinates: 27°51′35″N 55°18′07″E
- Country: Iran
- Province: Fars
- County: Larestan
- District: Central
- Capital: Darz

Population (2016)
  - Total: 6,081
- Time zone: UTC+3:30 (IRST)

Darz and Sayeban Rural District (Persian: دهستان درز و سابيان) is in the Central District of Larestan County, (Note: Formerly Lar County) Fars province, Iran. Its capital is the village of Darz.

== Demographics ==
=== Population ===
At the time of the 2006 National Census, the rural district's population was 5,859 in 1,202 households. There were 6,749 inhabitants in 1,642 households at the following census of 2011. The 2016 census measured the population of the rural district as 6,081 in 1,638 households. The most populous of its 40 villages was Chah Nahr, with 1,590 people.
