= Central District (Larestan County) =

District in Fars province, Iran

Central District (Larestan County) Persian: بخش مرکزی شهرستان لارستان
- District
- Location within Iran
- Coordinates: 27°45′34″N 54°56′52″E
- Country: Iran
- Province: Fars
- County: Larestan
- Capital: Lar

Population (2016)
  - Total: 104,146
- Time zone: UTC+3:30 (IRST)

The Central District of Larestan County (Persian: بخش مرکزی شهرستان لارستان) (Note: Formerly Lar County) is in Fars province, Iran. Its capital is the city of Lar.

== History ==
After the 2006 National Census, the village of Latifi was elevated to the status of a city, and in 2017, the village of Dehkuyeh rose to city status.

== Demographics ==
=== Population ===
At the time of the 2006 census, the district's population was 87,988 in 20,633 households. The following census in 2011 counted 106,511 people in 26,167 households. The 2016 census measured the population of the district as 104,146 inhabitants in 30,003 households.

=== Administrative divisions ===
Central District (Larestan County) Population
Administrative Divisions	2006	2011	2016
Darz and Sayeban RD	5,859	6,749	6,081
Dehkuyeh RD	9,169	11,423	10,769
Howmeh RD	14,629	9,398	10,613
Dehkuyeh (city) (Note: Became a city after the 2016 census)			
Khur (city)	6,370	6,821	7,338
Lar (city)	51,961	65,451	62,045
Latifi (city)		6,669	7,300
Total	87,988	106,511	104,146
RD = Rural District
