= Larestan County =

County in Fars province, Iran

Larestan County Persian: شهرستان لارستان
- County
- Location of Larestan County in Fars province (bottom right, green)

- Location of Fars province in Iran
- Coordinates: 27°48′N 54°33′E
- Country: Iran
- Province: Fars
- Capital: Lar
- Districts: Central, Banaruiyeh, Beyram, Sahray-ye Bagh

Population (2016)
  - Total: 213,920
- Time zone: UTC+3:30 (IRST)

Larestan County (Persian: شهرستان لارستان) (Note: Formerly Lar County (شهرستان لار)) is in Fars province, Iran. Its capital is the city of Lar.

== History ==
=== Early history ===
In the medieval ages, Laristan was ruled by the local Miladian dynasty, until it was removed by a Safavid invasion in 1602 led by Allahverdi Khan. In the thirteenth century, Larestan briefly became a center of trade and commerce in southern Persia. Larestan was nearly always an obscure region, never becoming involved in the politics and conflicts of mainstream Persia.

The historical region of Larestan consists of several counties in Fars province (Larestan County, Khonj County, Gerash County and Lamerd County) and Bastak County in Hormozgan province.

=== Administrative changes ===
In November 2008, Beyram, Evaz, and Gerash Districts were separated from the county in the establishment of Gerash County. However, Beyram and Evaz Districts were returned to Larestan County six months later. The village of Latifi was elevated to the status of a city, and the village of Emad Deh became the city of Emadshahr.

In December 2017, the village of Dehkuyeh rose to city status. Evaz District was separated from the county in 2018 to establish Evaz County. Juyom District (Note: Renamed the Central District of Juyom County) was separated from the county in 2021 in the establishment of Juyom County and renamed the Central District.

== Geography ==
Laristan is bounded to the east and northeast by Kerman province, and south by the Persian Gulf. It consists mainly of mountain ranges in the north and east, and of arid plains varied with rocky hills and sandy valleys stretching thence to the coast. In the highlands, where there are some fertile upland tracts, the climate is genial, but elsewhere it is extremely sultry.

== Demographics ==
=== Language ===
Larestani people speak the Larestani language. Larestani people are of Persian descent, the majority of Larestani people are Sunnis. Larestani people call themselves "Khodmooni".

=== Population ===
At the time of the 2006 census, the county's population was 223,235 in 49,571 households. The following census in 2011 counted 226,879 people in 54,686 households. The 2016 census measured the population of the county as 213,920 in 60,410 households.

=== Administrative divisions ===
Larestan County's population history and administrative structure over three consecutive censuses are shown in the following table.

Larestan County Population
Administrative Divisions	2006	2011	2016
Central District	87,988	106,511	104,146
Darz and Sayeban RD	5,859	6,749	6,081
Dehkuyeh RD	9,169	11,423	10,769
Howmeh RD	14,629	9,398	10,613
Dehkuyeh (city) (Note: Became a city after the 2016 census)			
Khur (city)	6,370	6,821	7,338
Lar (city)	51,961	65,451	62,045
Latifi (city)		6,669	7,300
Banaruiyeh District	17,174	19,321	16,723
Banaruiyeh RD	3,890	4,427	3,339
Deh Fish RD	3,966	3,917	4,307
Banaruiyeh (city)	9,318	10,977	9,077
Beyram District	12,389	14,128	13,732
Bala Deh RD	5,213	6,402	6,162
Beyram RD	656	347	270
Beyram (city)	6,520	7,379	7,300
Evaz District (Note: Transferred to Evaz County)	33,346	45,752	40,731
Bid Shahr RD	13,111	16,387	14,861
Fishvar RD	5,920	6,964	5,883
Evaz (city)	14,315	22,401	19,987
Gerash District (Note: Transferred to Gerash County)	39,348		
Arad RD	6,564		
Fedagh RD	5,210		
Gerash (city)	27,574		
Juyom District (Note: Transferred to Juyom County and renamed the Central District of Juyom County)	19,601	28,083	25,081
Harm RD	8,992	12,970	12,202
Juyom RD	4,213	6,303	4,869
Juyom (city)	6,396	8,810	8,010
Sahray-ye Bagh District	13,389	13,022	12,855
Emad Deh RD	6,813	2,239	1,613
Sahray-ye Bagh RD	6,576	6,277	7,007
Emadshahr (city) (Note: Formerly the village of Emad Deh)		4,506	4,235
Total	223,235	226,879	213,920
RD = Rural District

== Climate ==
Lar has a hot desert climate (BWh). Snowfall in Larestan is a very rare event. In February 2017, it snowed in this city after 50 years.

== See also ==
- Bastak and Bastak County
- Evaz and Evaz County
- Gerash County
- Hola (ethnic group)
- Khonj County
- Lamerd County
- Larestani people

Media related to Larestan County at Wikimedia Commons
