= Tang Ab =

Tang Ab or Tangab (Persian: تنگ اب) may refer to:

- Tang Ab, Larestan, Fars Province
- Tangab, Gilan
- Tang Ab, Khuzestan
- Tangab-e Sardar, Kohgiluyeh and Boyer-Ahmad Province
- Tangab-e Shur, Kohgiluyeh and Boyer-Ahmad Province
- Tangab-e Shush, Kohgiluyeh and Boyer-Ahmad Province
