= Sarab Biz =

Village in Kohgiluyeh and Boyer-Ahmad province, Iran

Sarab Biz Persian: سراببيز
- Village
- Location within Iran
- Coordinates: 30°23′22″N 51°04′59″E
- Country: Iran
- Province: Kohgiluyeh and Boyer-Ahmad
- County: Basht
- District: Central
- Rural District: Sarab Biz

Population (2016)
  - Total: 755
- Time zone: UTC+3:30 (IRST)

Sarab Biz (Persian: سراببيز) (Note: Also romanized as Sarāb Bīz; also known as Sar Āb Bīz-e Bālā, Sarāb Bīz ‘Olyā, Sarāb Nabīz, and Sarābīz-e Bālā) is a village in, and the capital of, Sarab Biz Rural District of the Central District of Basht County, Kohgiluyeh and Boyer-Ahmad province, Iran.

== Demographics ==
=== Population ===
At the time of the 2006 National Census, the village's population was 891 in 150 households, when it was in Babuyi Rural District of the former Basht District of Gachsaran County. The following census in 2011 counted 802 people in 168 households, by which time the district had separated from the county in the establishment of Basht County. The rural district was transferred to the new Bustan District, and Sarab Biz was transferred to Sarab Biz Rural District created in the new Central District. The 2016 census measured the population of the village as 755 people in 192 households. It was the most populous village in its rural district.
