= Bahrehana =

Village in Kohgiluyeh and Boyer-Ahmad province, Iran

Bahrehana Persian: بهره عنا
- Village
- Location within Iran
- Coordinates: 30°23′05″N 51°16′49″E
- Country: Iran
- Province: Kohgiluyeh and Boyer-Ahmad
- County: Basht
- District: Bustan
- Rural District: Talkhab

Population (2016)
  - Total: 524
- Time zone: UTC+3:30 (IRST)

Bahrehana (Persian: بهره عنا) (Note: Also romanized as Bahrehʿanā) is a village in Talkhab Rural District of Bustan District, Basht County, Kohgiluyeh and Boyer-Ahmad province, Iran.

== Demographics ==
=== Population ===
At the time of the 2006 National Census, the village's population was 825 in 147 households, when it was in Babuyi Rural District of the former Basht District of Gachsaran County. The following census in 2011 counted 633 people in 143 households, by which time the district had been separated from the county in the establishment of Basht County. The rural district was transferred to the new Bustan District, and Bahrehana was transferred to Talkhab Rural District created in the district. The 2016 census measured the population of the village as 524 people in 134 households. It was the most populous village in its rural district.
