= Karyan, Fars =

Village in Fars province, Iran

Karyan Persian: كاريان
- Village
- Location within Iran
- Coordinates: 28°08′55″N 53°32′34″E
- Country: Iran
- Province: Fars
- County: Juyom
- District: Harm
- Rural District: Karyan

Population (2016)
  - Total: 2,919
- Time zone: UTC+3:30 (IRST)

Karyan (Persian: كاريان) (Note: Also romanized as Kāreyān, Kārīān, Kārīyān, and Kāryān) is a village in, and the capital of, Karyan Rural District of Harm District, Juyom County, Fars province, Iran.

== Demographics ==
=== Population ===
At the time of the 2006 National Census, the village's population was 2,068 in 404 households, when it was in Harm Rural District of Juyom District (Note: Renamed the Central District of Juyom County) in Larestan County. (Note: Formerly Lar County) The following census in 2011 counted 2,843 people in 730 households. The 2016 census measured the population of the village as 2,919 people in 749 households.

After the census, the district was separated from the county in the establishment of Juyom County and renamed the Central District. The rural district was transferred to the new Harm District, and Karyan was transferred to Karyan Rural District created in the district.

== Overview ==
Karyan is the setting of a Zoroastrian legend during the time of the Muslim conquest of Persia, where a Muslim force of 12,000 men besieged Karyan only to be slain single-handedly and unopposed by a Persian defender named Shah Karan while they were engaged in their prayer. However, a new Muslim army, seeking revenge, was able to conquer Karyan after the betrayal of Shah Karan's wife and the residents were then massacred.
