= Chah Talkhab-e Olya =

Village in Kohgiluyeh and Boyer-Ahmad province, Iran

Chah Talkhab-e Olya Persian: چاه تلخاب عليا
- Village
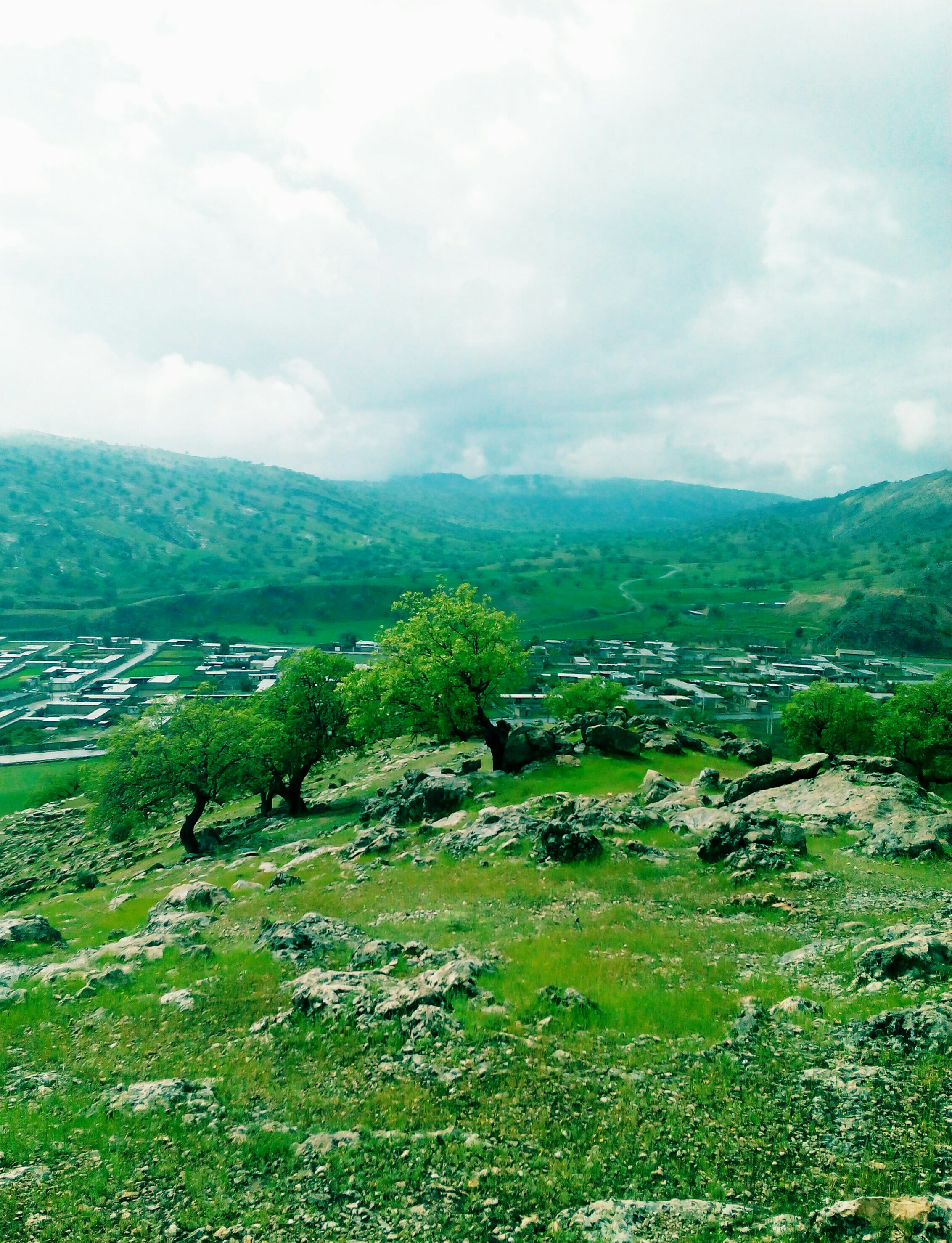
- The village of Chah Talkhab-e Olya

- Location within Iran
- Coordinates: 30°24′22″N 51°11′42″E
- Country: Iran
- Province: Kohgiluyeh and Boyer-Ahmad
- County: Basht
- District: Bustan
- Rural District: Talkhab

Population (2016)
  - Total: 369
- Time zone: UTC+3:30 (IRST)

Chah Talkhab-e Olya (Persian: چاه تلخاب عليا) (Note: Also romanized as Chāh Talkhāb-e ‘Olyā; also known as Chāh Talkhāb-e Bālā, Chāh Talkh-e Bar Āftāb, and Chāh Talkh-e Bār Āftāb) is a village in, and the capital of, Talkhab Rural District of Bustan District, Basht County, Kohgiluyeh and Boyer-Ahmad province, Iran.

== Demographics ==
=== Population ===
At the time of the 2006 National Census, the village's population was 509 in 91 households, when it was in Babuyi Rural District of the former Basht District of Gachsaran County. The following census in 2011 counted 476 people in 110 households, by which time the district had been separated from the county in the establishment of Basht County. The rural district was transferred to the new Bustan District, and Chah Talkhab-e Olya was transferred to Talkhab Rural District created in the district. The 2016 census measured the population of the village as 369 people in 100 households.
