= Chaghan =

Village in Fars province, Iran

Chaghan Persian: چغان
- Village
- Location within Iran
- Coordinates: 28°12′20″N 53°41′53″E
- Country: Iran
- Province: Fars
- County: Juyom
- District: Central
- Rural District: Chaghan

Population (2016)
  - Total: 1,630
- Time zone: UTC+3:30 (IRST)

Chaghan (Persian: چغان) (Note: Also romanized as Chaghān and Choghān) is a village in, and the capital of, Chaghan Rural District of the Central District (Note: Formerly Juyom District of Larestan County) of Juyom County, Fars province, Iran.

== Demographics ==
=== Population ===
At the time of the 2006 National Census, the village's population was 1,108 in 197 households, when it was in Harm Rural District of Juyom District (Note: Renamed the Central District of Juyom County) in Larestan County. (Note: Formerly Lar County) The following census in 2011 counted 1,209 people in 301 households. The 2016 census measured the population of the village as 1,630 people in 394 households.

After the census, the district was separated from the county in the establishment of Juyom County and renamed the Central District. The rural district was transferred to the new Harm District, and Chaghan was transferred to Chaghan Rural District created in the Central District.
