= Cheshmeh Darreh =

Cheshmeh Darreh or Cheshmeh-ye Darreh or Cheshmehdarreh (Persian: چشمه دره) may refer to:

- Cheshmeh Darreh, Fars
- Cheshmeh Darreh, Kohgiluyeh and Boyer-Ahmad
- Cheshmeh Darreh, Boyer-Ahmad, Kohgiluyeh and Boyer-Ahmad Province
- Cheshmeh Darreh, Lorestan
