= Ab Kenaru =

Ab Kenaru or Ab Kanaru or Ab Konaru (Persian: اب كنارو) may refer to:

- Ab Konaru, Fars, in Fars Province
- Ab Kanaru, Basht, in Kohgiluyeh and Boyer-Ahmad Province
- Ab Kenaru, Charam, in Kohgiluyeh and Boyer-Ahmad Province
