= Deh Bozorg =

Deh Bozorg or Deh-e Bozorg (Persian: ده بزرگ, meaning "big village") may refer to:

- Deh-e Bozorg, Isfahan
- Deh Bozorg, Kohgiluyeh and Boyer-Ahmad
- Deh-e Bozorg-e Firuzabad, Kohgiluyeh and Boyer-Ahmad Province
- Deh Bozorg-e Pereshkaft, Kohgiluyeh and Boyer-Ahmad Province
- Deh Bozorg-e Sisakht, Kohgiluyeh and Boyer-Ahmad Province
- Deh Bozorg, alternate name of Darreh Goru Firuzabad, Kohgiluyeh and Boyer-Ahmad Province
- Deh Bozorg, alternate name of Azizabad-e Qeytasvand, Lorestan Province
- Deh-e Bozorg, Pol-e Dokhtar, Lorestan Province
- Deh-e Bozorg, Mamulan, Lorestan Province
