= Dul-e Bozorg Khan Ahmad =

Dul-e Bozorg Khan Ahmad دول بزرگ خان احمد
- Village
- Country: Iran
- Province: Kohgiluyeh and Boyer-Ahmad
- County: Basht
- Bakhsh: Basht
- Rural District: Babuyi

Population (2006)
  - Total: 41
- Time zone: UTC+3:30 (IRST)
  - Summer (DST): UTC+4:30 (IRDT)

Dul-e Bozorg Khan Ahmad (Persian: دول بزرگ خان احمد, also Romanized as Dūl-e Bozorg Khān Aḩmad) is a village in Babuyi Rural District, Basht District, Basht County, Kohgiluyeh and Boyer-Ahmad Province, Iran. At the 2006 census, its population was 41, in 11 families.
