= Goshtasb Khan Ahmad-e Sofla =

Goshtasb Khan Ahmad-e Sofla گشتاسب خان احمدسفلي
- Village
- Country: Iran
- Province: Kohgiluyeh and Boyer-Ahmad
- County: Basht
- Bakhsh: Basht
- Rural District: Babuyi

Population (2006)
  - Total: 130
- Time zone: UTC+3:30 (IRST)
  - Summer (DST): UTC+4:30 (IRDT)

Goshtasb Khan Ahmad-e Sofla (Persian: گشتاسب خان احمدسفلي, also Romanized as Goshtāsb Khān Aḩmad-e Soflá) is a village in Babuyi Rural District, Basht District, Basht County, Kohgiluyeh and Boyer-Ahmad Province, Iran. At the 2006 census, its population was 130, in 27 families.
