= Gowd-e Murd =

Gowd-e Murd گودمورد
- Village
- Country: Iran
- Province: Kohgiluyeh and Boyer-Ahmad
- County: Basht
- Bakhsh: Central
- Rural District: Kuh Mareh Khami

Population (2006)
  - Total: 24
- Time zone: UTC+3:30 (IRST)
  - Summer (DST): UTC+4:30 (IRDT)

Gowd-e Murd (Persian: گودمورد, also Romanized as Gowd-e Mūrd) is a village in Kuh Mareh Khami Rural District, in the Central District of Basht County, Kohgiluyeh and Boyer-Ahmad Province, Iran. At the 2006 census, its population was 24, in 6 families.
