= Narg-e Musa =

Narg-e Musa نارگ موسي
- Village
- Location within Iran
- Coordinates: 30°29′13″N 51°02′16″E
- Country: Iran
- Province: Kohgiluyeh and Boyer-Ahmad
- County: Basht
- Bakhsh: Central
- Rural District: Kuh Mareh Khami

Population (2006)
  - Total: 179
- Time zone: UTC+3:30 (IRST)
  - Summer (DST): UTC+4:30 (IRDT)

Narg-e Musa (Persian: نارگ موسي, also Romanized as Nārg-e Mūsá; also known as Nārak Mūsá, Nārj-e Mūsá, and Nārj Mūsā) is a village in Kuh Mareh Khami Rural District, in the Central District of Basht County, Kohgiluyeh and Boyer-Ahmad Province, Iran. At the 2006 census, its population was 179, in 30 families.
