= Kateh-ye Basht =

Kateh-ye Basht كته باشت
- Village
- Location within Iran
- Coordinates: 30°20′20″N 51°11′09″E
- Country: Iran
- Province: Kohgiluyeh and Boyer-Ahmad
- County: Basht
- Bakhsh: Basht
- Rural District: Babuyi

Population (2006)
  - Total: 370
- Time zone: UTC+3:30 (IRST)
  - Summer (DST): UTC+4:30 (IRDT)

Kateh-ye Basht (Persian: كته باشت, also Romanized as Kateh-ye Bāsht and Kateh Bāsht; also known as Kateh, Katteh, and Sādāt-e Anā) is a village in Babuyi Rural District, Basht District, Basht County, Kohgiluyeh and Boyer-Ahmad Province, Iran. At the 2006 census, its population was 370, in 71 families.
