= Liru Nasrollah =

Liru Nasrollah ليرونصراله
- Village
- Location within Iran
- Coordinates: 30°37′32″N 51°00′00″E
- Country: Iran
- Province: Kohgiluyeh and Boyer-Ahmad
- County: Basht
- Bakhsh: Central
- Rural District: Kuh Mareh Khami

Population (2006)
  - Total: 14
- Time zone: UTC+3:30 (IRST)
  - Summer (DST): UTC+4:30 (IRDT)

Liru Nasrollah (Persian: ليرونصراله, also Romanized as Līrū Naṣrollah; also known as Līrū) is a village in Kuh Mareh Khami Rural District, in the Central District of Basht County, Kohgiluyeh and Boyer-Ahmad Province, Iran. At the 2006 census, its population was 14, in 5 families.
