= Chahar Rah-e Gashin =

Chahar Rah-e Gashin چهارراه گشين
- Village
- Location within Iran
- Coordinates: 30°25′26″N 51°09′05″E
- Country: Iran
- Province: Kohgiluyeh and Boyer-Ahmad
- County: Basht
- Bakhsh: Central
- Rural District: Kuh Mareh Khami

Population (2006)
  - Total: 73
- Time zone: UTC+3:30 (IRST)
  - Summer (DST): UTC+4:30 (IRDT)

Chahar Rah-e Gashin (Persian: چهارراه گشين, also Romanized as Chahār Rāh-e Gashīn) is a village in Kuh Mareh Khami Rural District, in the Central District of Basht County, Kohgiluyeh and Boyer-Ahmad Province, Iran. At the 2006 census, its population was 73, in 10 families.
