= Bormamian =

Bormamian برماميان
- Village
- Location within Iran
- Coordinates: 30°20′32″N 51°03′42″E
- Country: Iran
- Province: Kohgiluyeh and Boyer-Ahmad
- County: Basht
- Bakhsh: Basht
- Rural District: Babuyi

Population (2006)
  - Total: 139
- Time zone: UTC+3:30 (IRST)
  - Summer (DST): UTC+4:30 (IRDT)

Bormamian (Persian: برماميان, also Romanized as Bormāmīān, Bormāmeyān, and Barmāmīān; also known as Barmayūn) is a village in Babuyi Rural District, Basht District, Basht County, Kohgiluyeh and Boyer-Ahmad Province, Iran. At the 2006 census, its population was 139, in 31 families.
