= Mollah Barfi =

Mollah Barfi مله برفي
- Village
- Location within Iran
- Coordinates: 30°17′54″N 51°15′23″E
- Country: Iran
- Province: Kohgiluyeh and Boyer-Ahmad
- County: Basht
- Bakhsh: Basht
- Rural District: Babuyi

Population (2006)
  - Total: 164
- Time zone: UTC+3:30 (IRST)
  - Summer (DST): UTC+4:30 (IRDT)

Mollah Barfi (Persian: مله برفي, also Romanized as Mollah Barfī; also known as Mollā Barfī) is a village in Babuyi Rural District, Basht District, Basht County, Kohgiluyeh and Boyer-Ahmad Province, Iran. At the 2006 census, its population was 164, in 34 families.
