= Tang-e Hamgun =

Tang-e Hamgun تنگ همگون
- Village
- Location within Iran
- Coordinates: 30°27′50″N 51°00′16″E
- Country: Iran
- Province: Kohgiluyeh and Boyer-Ahmad
- County: Basht
- Bakhsh: Central
- Rural District: Kuh Mareh Khami

Population (2006)
  - Total: 71
- Time zone: UTC+3:30 (IRST)
  - Summer (DST): UTC+4:30 (IRDT)

Tang-e Hamgun (Persian: تنگ همگون, also Romanized as Tang-e Hamgūn; also known as Hongūn, Tang-e Hangūn, and Tang-e Hongūl) is a village in Kuh Mareh Khami Rural District, in the Central District of Basht County, Kohgiluyeh and Boyer-Ahmad Province, Iran. At the 2006 census, its population was 71, in 13 families.
