= Ghazanfar =

- Gender: Male

Origin
- Origin: Arabic
- Meaning: Lion

Other names
- Related names: Gazanfer, Gazanfar, Ghazanfer, Ghaznafar

Ghazanfar (غضنفر) is a masculine given name and surname of Arabic origin. Notable people with the name include:

== Given name ==
- Gazanfer Agha (died 1603), Ottoman politician
- Gazanfar Akbarov (1917–1944), Azerbaijani Red Army officer
- Gazanfar Khaligov (1898–1981), Azerbaijani painter
- Gazanfar Musabekov (1888–1938), Azerbaijani Bolshevik revolutionary and Soviet statesman
- Gazanfer Bilge (1924–2008), Turkish sports wrestler
- Gazanfer Özcan (1931–2009), Turkish actor
- Ghazanfar Abbas Cheena (born 1962), Pakistani politician
- Ghazanfar Abbas Shah, Pakistani colonel
- Ghazanfar Ali (born 1978), Pakistani hockey player
- Ghazanfar Ali Khan (1895–1963), Pakistani diplomat
- Ghazanfar Roknabadi (1966–2015), Iranian diplomat
- Mir Ghazanfar Ali Khan (born 1945), Gilgit-Baltistani politician
- Nawabzada Gazanfar Ali Gul, Pakistani politician
- Sardar Ghaznafar Ali Khan, Punjabi politician
- Ghazanfar-Jang Bangash Khan (1665–1743), Pashtun Nawab and Governor in the Mughal Empire

== Surname ==
- Allah Mohammad Ghazanfar (born 2007), Afghan cricketer
- Husn Banu Ghazanfar (born 1957), Afghan politician
- Mohammad Ghazanfar (born 1994), Hong Kongese cricketer

== See also ==
- Ghaznafar, former name of Aragats, Aparan, a village in Armenia
- Ghazanfarabad, village in West Azerbaijan
- Ghazanfari, village in Khaf County, Iran
- Ghazanfari Khan Ahmad-e Sofla, village in Basht District, Iran
- Ghazanfarkhani, village in Boyer-Ahmad County, Iran
