= Harm, Iran =

Village in Fars province, Iran

Harm Persian: هرم
- Village
- Location within Iran
- Coordinates: 28°10′46″N 53°29′11″E
- Country: Iran
- Province: Fars
- County: Juyom
- District: Harm
- Rural District: Harm

Population (2016)
  - Total: 1,837
- Time zone: UTC+3:30 (IRST)

Harm (Persian: هرم) is a village in, and the capital of, Harm Rural District of Harm District, Juyom County, Fars province, Iran. The previous capital of the rural district was the village of Bolghan.

== Demographics ==
=== Population ===
At the time of the 2006 National Census, the village's population was 1,759 in 342 households, when it was in the former Juyom District of Larestan County. (Note: Formerly Lar County) The following census in 2011 counted 2,278 people in 529 households. The 2016 census measured the population of the village as 1,837 people in 461 households.

After the census, the district was separated from the county in the establishment of Juyom County, and the rural district was transferred to the new Harm District.
