= Orf, Iran =

Orf عرف
- Village
- Location within Iran
- Coordinates: 30°31′09″N 51°00′05″E
- Country: Iran
- Province: Kohgiluyeh and Boyer-Ahmad
- County: Basht
- Bakhsh: Central
- Rural District: Kuh Mareh Khami

Population (2006)
  - Total: 11
- Time zone: UTC+3:30 (IRST)
  - Summer (DST): UTC+4:30 (IRDT)

Orf (Persian: عرف, also Romanized as ‘Orf; also known as Ārū) is a village in Kuh Mareh Khami Rural District, in the Central District of Basht County, Kohgiluyeh and Boyer-Ahmad Province, Iran. At the 2006 census, its population was 11, in four families.
