= Cham Bolbol =

Cham Bolbol چم بلبل
- Village
- Location within Iran
- Coordinates: 30°19′14″N 51°14′16″E
- Country: Iran
- Province: Kohgiluyeh and Boyer-Ahmad
- County: Basht
- Bakhsh: Basht
- Rural District: Babuyi

Population (2006)
  - Total: 203
- Time zone: UTC+3:30 (IRST)
  - Summer (DST): UTC+4:30 (IRDT)

Cham Bolbol (Persian: چم بلبل, also Romanized as Chambolbol) is a village in Babuyi Rural District, Basht District, Basht County, Kohgiluyeh and Boyer-Ahmad Province, Iran. At the 2006 census, its population was 203, in 41 families.
