= Shah Zeynali =

Shah Zeynali شاه زينعلي
- Village
- Location within Iran
- Coordinates: 30°26′48″N 51°00′18″E
- Country: Iran
- Province: Kohgiluyeh and Boyer-Ahmad
- County: Basht
- Bakhsh: Central
- Rural District: Kuh Mareh Khami

Population (2006)
  - Total: 222
- Time zone: UTC+3:30 (IRST)
  - Summer (DST): UTC+4:30 (IRDT)

Shah Zeynali (Persian: شاه زينعلي, also Romanized as Shāh Zeyn‘alī; also known as Emāmzādeh Shāh Zeyn‘alī, Shāhzādeh Zeyn‘alī, and Tang-e Sādāt) is a village in Kuh Mareh Khami Rural District, in the Central District of Basht County, Kohgiluyeh and Boyer-Ahmad Province, Iran. At the 2006 census, its population was 222, in 46 families.
