= Nazgun-e Olya =

Nazgun-e Olya نازگون عليا
- Village
- Location within Iran
- Coordinates: 30°29′51″N 51°00′17″E
- Country: Iran
- Province: Kohgiluyeh and Boyer-Ahmad
- County: Basht
- Bakhsh: Central
- Rural District: Kuh Mareh Khami

Population (2006)
  - Total: 48
- Time zone: UTC+3:30 (IRST)
  - Summer (DST): UTC+4:30 (IRDT)

Nazgun-e Olya (Persian: نازگون عليا, also Romanized as Nāzgūn-e ‘Olyā; also known as Nāz Gūn) is a village in Kuh Mareh Khami Rural District, in the Central District of Basht County, Kohgiluyeh and Boyer-Ahmad Province, Iran. At the 2006 census, its population was 48, in 11 families.
