= Busangan =

Busangan بوسنگان
- Village
- Location within Iran
- Coordinates: 30°28′16″N 51°03′27″E
- Country: Iran
- Province: Kohgiluyeh and Boyer-Ahmad
- County: Basht
- Bakhsh: Central
- Rural District: Kuh Mareh Khami

Population (2006)
  - Total: 105
- Time zone: UTC+3:30 (IRST)
  - Summer (DST): UTC+4:30 (IRDT)

Busangan (Persian: بوسنگان, also Romanized as Būsangān and Būsengān; also known as Būsanjān and Būstegān) is a village in Kuh Mareh Khami Rural District, in the Central District of Basht County, Kohgiluyeh and Boyer-Ahmad Province, Iran. At the 2006 census, its population was 105, in 18 families.
