= Chalmureh =

Chalmureh چال موره
- Village
- Location within Iran
- Coordinates: 30°21′09″N 51°14′13″E
- Country: Iran
- Province: Kohgiluyeh and Boyer-Ahmad
- County: Basht
- Bakhsh: Basht
- Rural District: Babuyi

Population (2006)
  - Total: 418
- Time zone: UTC+3:30 (IRST)
  - Summer (DST): UTC+4:30 (IRDT)

Chalmureh (Persian: چال موره, also Romanized as Chālmūreh) is a village in Babuyi Rural District, Basht District, Basht County, Kohgiluyeh and Boyer-Ahmad Province, Iran. At the 2006 census, its population was 418, in 71 families.
