= Abdehgah =

Village in Kohgiluyeh and Boyer-Ahmad province, Iran

Abdehgah Persian: ابدهگاه
- Village
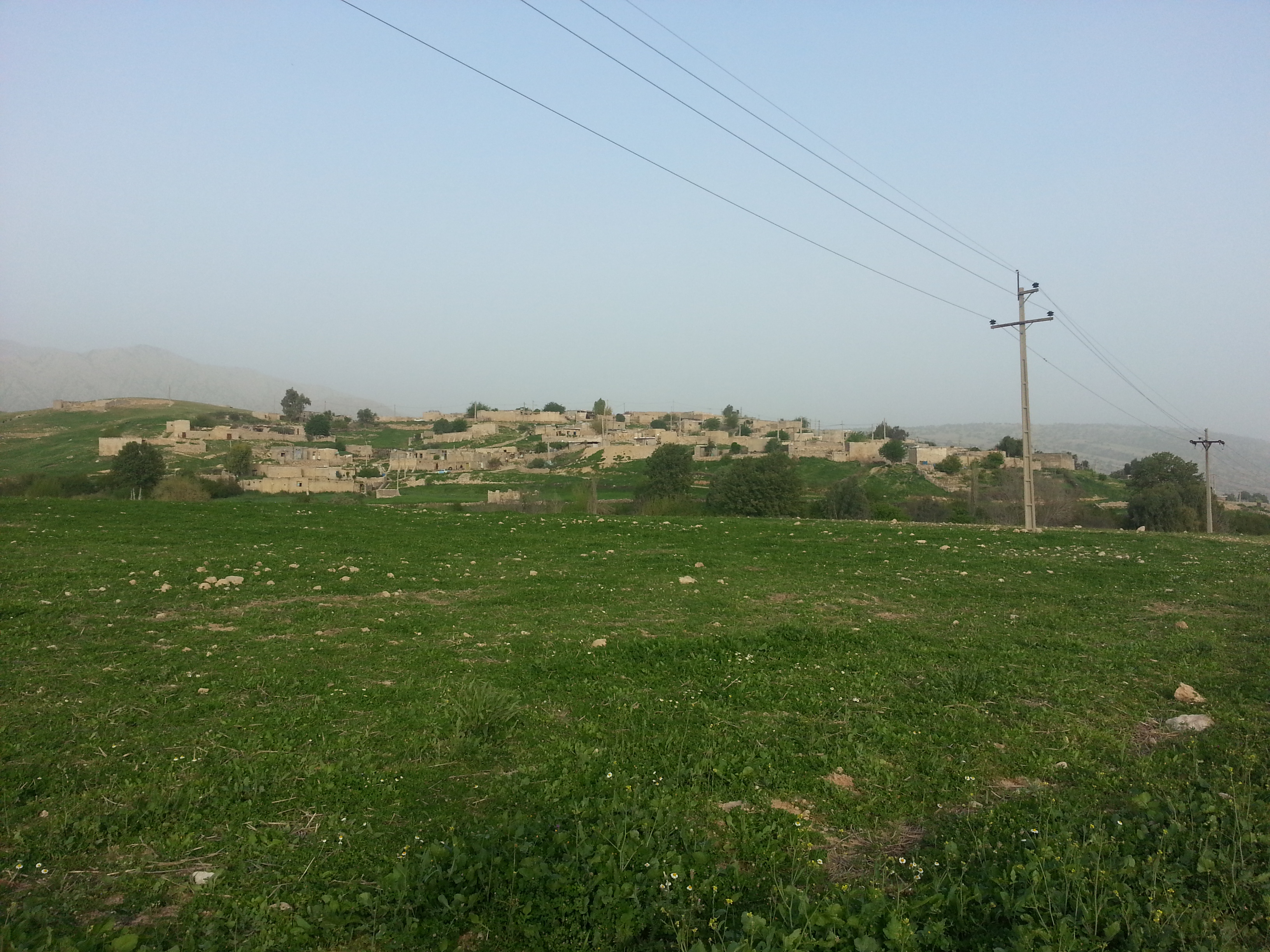
- The village of Abdehgah

- Location within Iran
- Coordinates: 30°27′03″N 51°02′40″E
- Country: Iran
- Province: Kohgiluyeh and Boyer-Ahmad
- County: Basht
- District: Central
- Rural District: Kuh Mareh Khami

Population (2016)
  - Total: 342
- Time zone: UTC+3:30 (IRST)

Abdehgah (Persian: ابدهگاه) (Note: Also romanized as Ābdehgāh) is a village in, and the capital of, Kuh Mareh Khami Rural District of the Central District of Basht County, Kohgiluyeh and Boyer-Ahmad province, Iran.

== Demographics ==
=== Population ===
At the time of the 2006 National Census, the village's population was 562 in 105 households, when it was in the former Basht District of Gachsaran County. The following census in 2011 counted 455 people in 114 households, by which time the district had been separated from the county in the establishment of Basht County. The rural district was transferred to the new Central District. The 2016 census measured the population of the village as 342 people in 93 households. It was the most populous village in its rural district.
