= Shadegan, Kohgiluyeh and Boyer-Ahmad =

Shadegan شادگان Goru Gowrū گورو
- Village
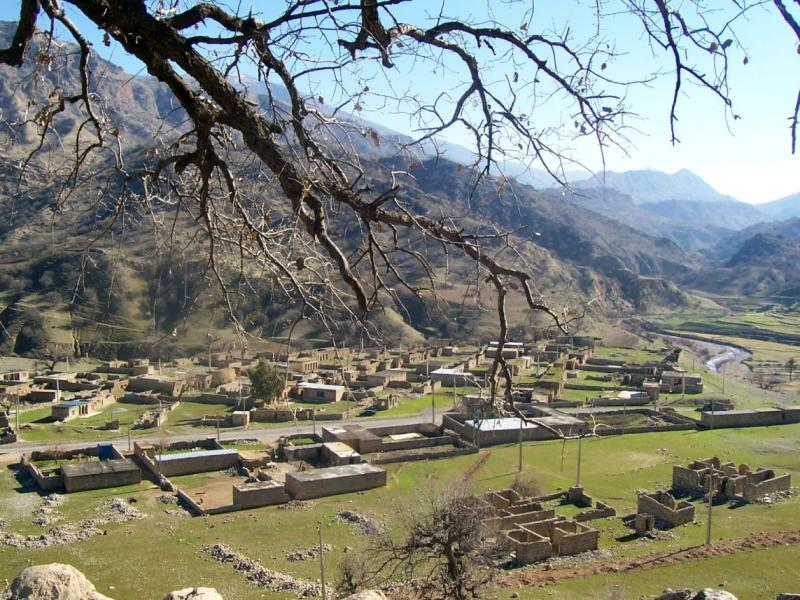
- A View of the Village

- Location within Iran
- Coordinates: 30°33′45″N 50°55′11″E
- Country: Iran
- Province: Kohgiluyeh and Boyer-Ahmad
- County: Basht
- District: Central
- Rural District: Kuh Mareh Khami

Population (2006)
  - Total: 26
- Time zone: UTC+3:30 (IRST)
  - Summer (DST): UTC+4:30 (IRDT)

Shadegan (Persian: شادگان, also Romanized as Shādegān ([ʃɒːdeɡɒːn]), locally known as Guru (گورو) ([ɡuɾuː])) is a village in Kuh Mareh Khami Rural District, in the Central District of Basht County, Kohgiluyeh and Boyer-Ahmad Province, Iran. At the 2006 census, its population was 26, in 8 families.

== Gallery ==
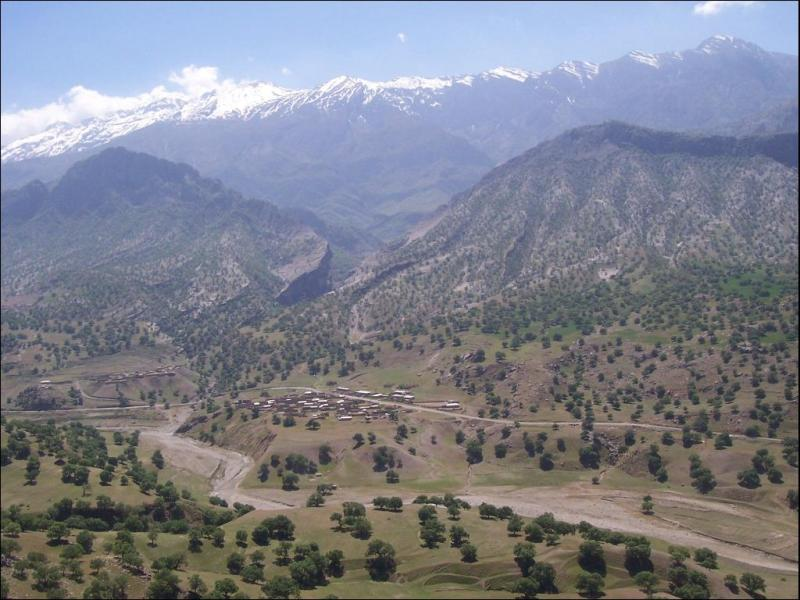
The village of Shadegan and the surrounding landscape

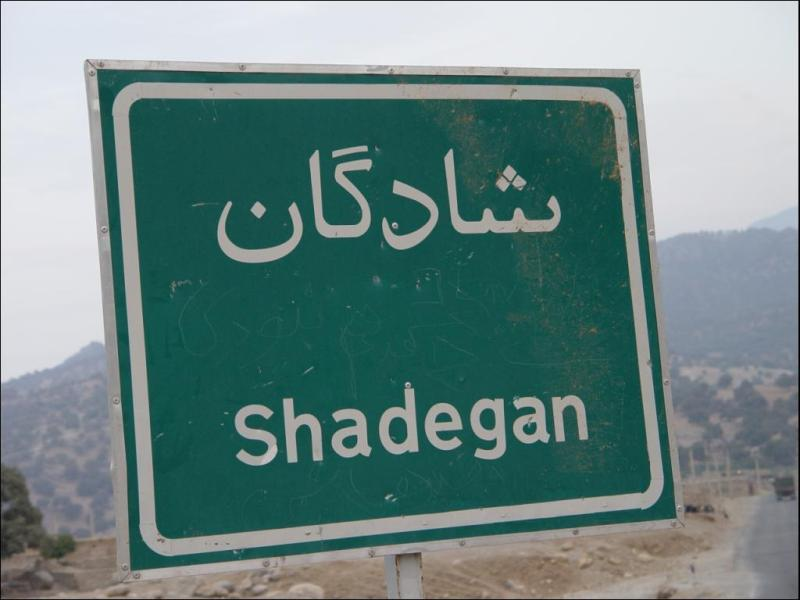
Shadegan road sign

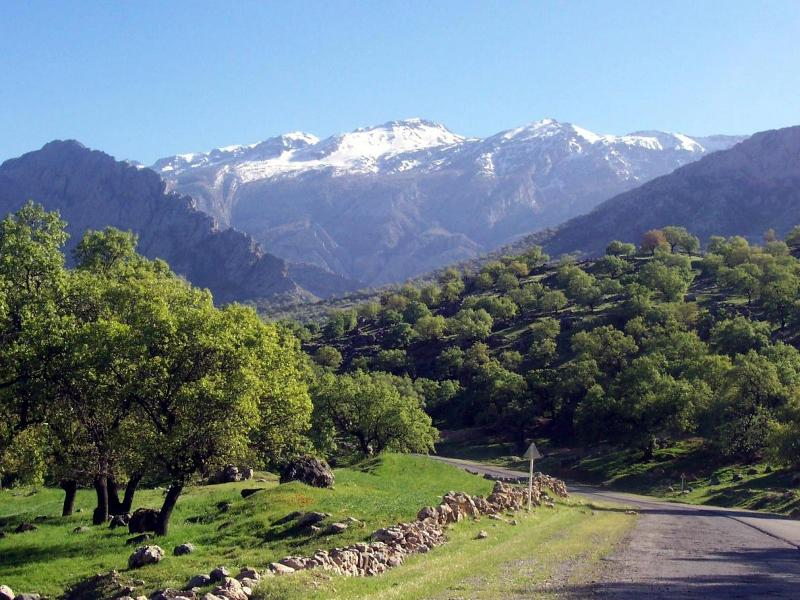
Shadegan road

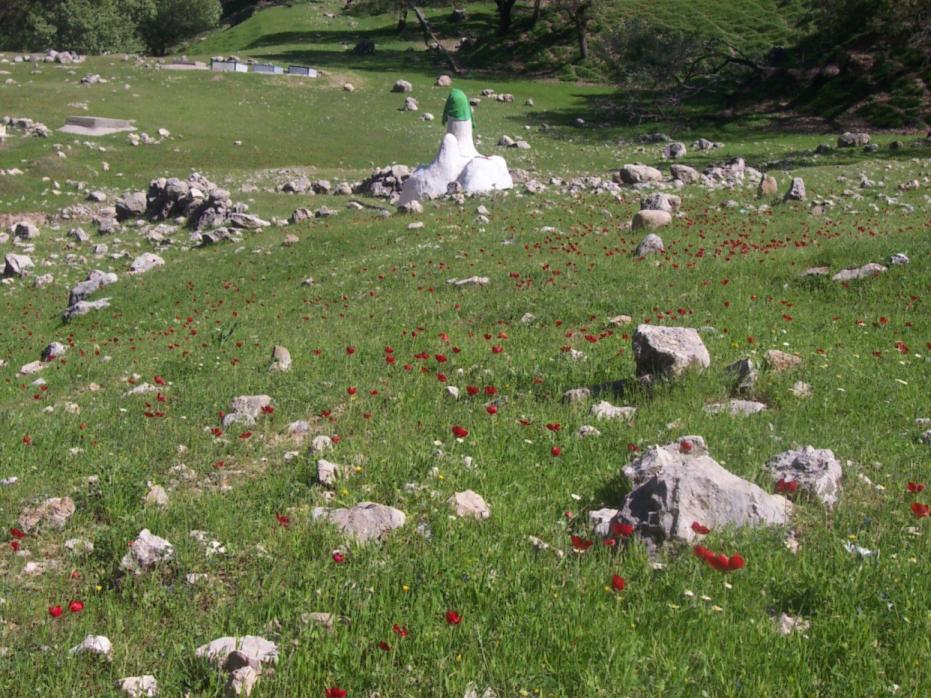
The Tombs of the Do Pir-e-Jofteh

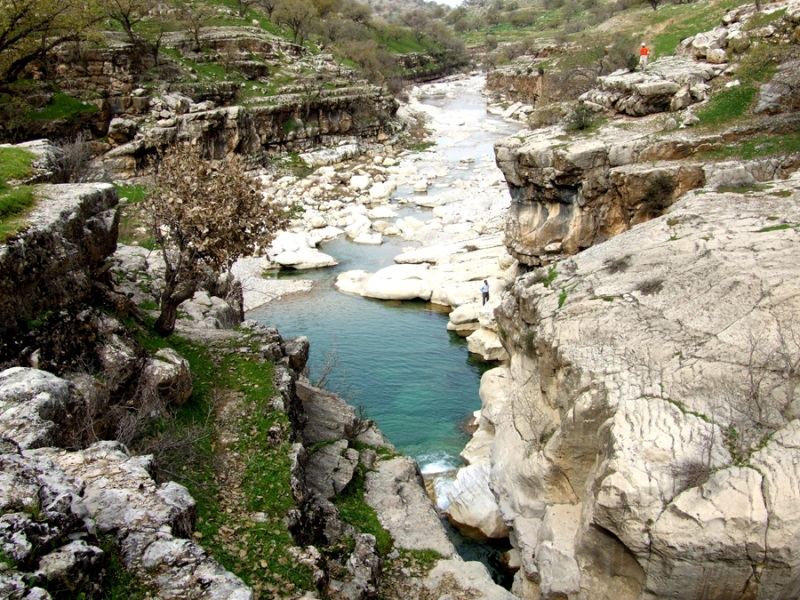
The local river, Roo Bashti
