= Mollah-ye Tam =

Mollah-ye Tam مله تم
- Village
- Location within Iran
- Coordinates: 30°28′00″N 51°05′00″E
- Country: Iran
- Province: Kohgiluyeh and Boyer-Ahmad
- County: Basht
- Bakhsh: Central
- Rural District: Kuh Mareh Khami

Population (2006)
  - Total: 31
- Time zone: UTC+3:30 (IRST)
  - Summer (DST): UTC+4:30 (IRDT)

Mollah-ye Tam (Persian: مله تم; also known as Mollā-ye Tam and Mollay Jom) is a village in Kuh Mareh Khami Rural District, in the Central District of Basht County, Kohgiluyeh and Boyer-Ahmad Province, Iran. At the 2006 census, its population was 31, in 7 families.
