= Mian Tangan =

Mian Tangan ميان تنگان
- Village
- Location within Iran
- Coordinates: 30°52′57″N 51°02′10″E
- Country: Iran
- Province: Kohgiluyeh and Boyer-Ahmad
- County: Basht
- Bakhsh: Central
- Rural District: Kuh Mareh Khami

Population (2006)
  - Total: 39
- Time zone: UTC+3:30 (IRST)
  - Summer (DST): UTC+4:30 (IRDT)

Mian Tangan (Persian: ميان تنگان, also Romanized as Mīān Tangān and Mīyān Tangān) is a village in Kuh Mareh Khami Rural District, in the Central District of Basht County, Kohgiluyeh and Boyer-Ahmad Province, Iran. At the 2006 census, its population was 39, in 6 families.
