= Kalah Gun =

Kalah Gun كله گون
- Village
- Location within Iran
- Coordinates: 30°25′48″N 51°01′16″E
- Country: Iran
- Province: Kohgiluyeh and Boyer-Ahmad
- County: Basht
- Bakhsh: Central
- Rural District: Kuh Mareh Khami

Population (2006)
  - Total: 158
- Time zone: UTC+3:30 (IRST)
  - Summer (DST): UTC+4:30 (IRDT)

Kalah Gun (Persian: كله گون, also Romanized as Kalāh Gūn; also known as Kalā Gūn and Kaleh Gān) the village in Kuh Mareh Khami Rural District, in the Central District of Basht County, Kohgiluyeh and Boyer-Ahmad Province, Iran. At the 2006 census, its population was 158, in 29 families.
