= Kohleh Bardkuh Shah Bahram =

Kohleh Bardkuh Shah Bahram كهله بردكوه شاه بهرام
- Village
- Country: Iran
- Province: Kohgiluyeh and Boyer-Ahmad
- County: Basht
- Bakhsh: Central
- Rural District: Kuh Mareh Khami

Population (2006)
  - Total: 28
- Time zone: UTC+3:30 (IRST)
  - Summer (DST): UTC+4:30 (IRDT)

Kohleh Bardkuh Shah Bahram (Persian: كهله بردكوه شاه بهرام, also Romanized as Kohleh Bardkūh Shāh Bahrām) is a village in Kuh Mareh Khami Rural District, in the Central District of Basht County, Kohgiluyeh and Boyer-Ahmad Province, Iran. At the 2006 census, its population was 28, in 8 families.
