= Emamzamen, Kohgiluyeh and Boyer-Ahmad =

Emamzamen امام ضامن
- village
- Location within Iran
- Coordinates: 30°17′06″N 51°14′59″E
- Country: Iran
- Province: Kohgiluyeh and Boyer-Ahmad
- County: Basht
- Bakhsh: Basht
- Rural District: Babuyi

Population (2016)
  - Total: 67
- Time zone: UTC+3:30 (IRST)
  - Summer (DST): UTC+4:30 (IRDT)

Emamzamen (Persian: امام ضامن, also Romanized as Emāmz̤āmen) is a village in Babuyi Rural District, Basht District, Basht County, Kohgiluyeh and Boyer-Ahmad Province, Iran. At the 2016 census, its population was 67.
