= Ataabad, Fars =

Ataabad عطااباد
- Village
- Location within Iran
- Coordinates: 28°11′45″N 53°49′58″E
- Country: Iran
- Province: Fars
- County: Larestan
- Bakhsh: Juyom
- Rural District: Harm

Population (2006)
  - Total: 32
- Time zone: UTC+3:30 (IRST)
  - Summer (DST): UTC+4:30 (IRDT)

Ataabad (Persian: عطااباد, also Romanized as Aţāābād) is a village in Harm Rural District, Juyom District, Larestan County, Fars province, Iran. At the 2006 census, its population was 32, in 6 families.
