= Talkhab-e Olya, Kohgiluyeh and Boyer-Ahmad =

Talkhab-e Olya تلخاب عليا
- Village
- Location within Iran
- Coordinates: 30°47′25″N 50°53′16″E
- Country: Iran
- Province: Kohgiluyeh and Boyer-Ahmad
- County: Basht
- Bakhsh: Central
- Rural District: Kuh Mareh Khami

Population (2006)
  - Total: 56
- Time zone: UTC+3:30 (IRST)
  - Summer (DST): UTC+4:30 (IRDT)

Talkhab-e Olya (Persian: تلخاب عليا, also Romanized as Talkhāb-e ‘Olyā; also known as Talkhāb-e Bālā) is a village in Kuh Mareh Khami Rural District, in the Central District of Basht County, Kohgiluyeh and Boyer-Ahmad Province, Iran. At the 2006 census, its population was 56, in 10 families.
