= Shah Bahram, Kohgiluyeh and Boyer-Ahmad =

Shah Bahram شاه بهرام
- Village
- Location within Iran
- Coordinates: 30°35′23″N 50°53′03″E
- Country: Iran
- Province: Kohgiluyeh and Boyer-Ahmad
- County: Basht
- Bakhsh: Central
- Rural District: Kuh Mareh Khami

Population (2006)
  - Total: 211
- Time zone: UTC+3:30 (IRST)
  - Summer (DST): UTC+4:30 (IRDT)

Shah Bahram (Persian: شاه بهرام, also Romanized as Shāh Bahrām) is a village in Kuh Mareh Khami Rural District, in the Central District of Basht County, Kohgiluyeh and Boyer-Ahmad Province, Iran. At the 2006 census, its population was 211, in 49 families.
