= Ab Kanaru, Basht =

Ab Kanaru اب كنارو
- Village
- Location within Iran
- Coordinates: 30°20′42″N 51°05′42″E
- Country: Iran
- Province: Kohgiluyeh and Boyer-Ahmad
- County: Basht
- Bakhsh: Basht
- Rural District: Babuyi

Population (2006)
  - Total: 151
- Time zone: UTC+3:30 (IRST)
  - Summer (DST): UTC+4:30 (IRDT)

Ab Kanaru (Persian: اب كنارو, also Romanized as Āb Kanārū; also known as Āb Kanārūn, Āb Kenāreh, and Khān Aḩmad-e Bālā) is a village in Babuyi Rural District, Basht District, Basht County, Kohgiluyeh and Boyer-Ahmad Province, Iran. At the 2006 census, its population was 151, in 32 families.
