= Kuhsarak-e Olya =

Kuhsarak-e Olya كوه سرك عليا
- Village
- Location within Iran
- Coordinates: 30°32′47″N 50°55′25″E
- Country: Iran
- Province: Kohgiluyeh and Boyer-Ahmad
- County: Basht
- Bakhsh: Central
- Rural District: Kuh Mareh Khami

Population (2006)
  - Total: 75
- Time zone: UTC+3:30 (IRST)
  - Summer (DST): UTC+4:30 (IRDT)

Kuhsarak-e Olya (Persian: كوه سرك عليا, also Romanized as Kūhsarak-e ‘Olyā) is a village in Kuh Mareh Khami Rural District, in the Central District of Basht County, Kohgiluyeh and Boyer-Ahmad Province, Iran. At the 2006 census, its population was 75, in 19 families.
