= Hajj Qalandar =

Hajj Qalandar or Hajqalandar (Persian: حاج قلندر) may refer to:

- Hajj Qalandar, Kerman
- Hajj Qalandar, Kohgiluyeh and Boyer-Ahmad
