= Kazangan =

Kazangan (Persian: كزنگان) may refer to:

- Kazangan-e Olya
- Kazangan-e Sofla
