= Ghazanfari Khan Ahmad-e Sofla =

Ghazanfari Khan Ahmad-e Sofla غضنفري خان احمدسفلي
- Village
- Location within Iran
- Coordinates: 30°19′00″N 51°06′00″E
- Country: Iran
- Province: Kohgiluyeh and Boyer-Ahmad
- County: Basht
- Bakhsh: Basht
- Rural District: Babuyi

Population (2006)
  - Total: 114
- Time zone: UTC+3:30 (IRST)
  - Summer (DST): UTC+4:30 (IRDT)

Ghazanfari Khan Ahmad-e Sofla (Persian: غضنفري خان احمدسفلي, also Romanized as Ghaẕanfarī Khān Aḩmad-e Soflá; also known as Ghaẕanfarī) is a village in Babuyi Rural District, Basht District, Basht County, Kohgiluyeh and Boyer-Ahmad Province, Iran. At the 2006 census, its population was 114, in 26 families.
