= Pir Eshkaft =

Pir Eshkaft (Persian: پير اشكفت) may refer to:

- Pir Eshkaft, Boyer-Ahmad
- Pir Eshkaft, Dana
