= Tarqideh =

Tarqideh ترقيده
- Village
- Location within Iran
- Coordinates: 28°18′58″N 53°49′47″E
- Country: Iran
- Province: Fars
- County: Larestan
- Bakhsh: Juyom
- Rural District: Juyom

Population (2006)
  - Total: 32
- Time zone: UTC+3:30 (IRST)
  - Summer (DST): UTC+4:30 (IRDT)

Tarqideh (Persian: ترقيده, also Romanized as Tarqīdeh; also known as Tarkīdeh) is a village in Juyom Rural District, Juyom District, Larestan County, Fars province, Iran. At the 2006 census, its population was 32, in 6 families.
