= Talkhab-e Olya =

Talkhab-e Olya (Persian: تلخاب عليا) may refer to:

- Talkhab-e Olya, Fars
- Talkhab-e Olya, Kohgiluyeh and Boyer-Ahmad
