= Hajj Qalandar, Kohgiluyeh and Boyer-Ahmad =

Hajj Qalandar حاج قلندر
- Village
- Location within Iran
- Coordinates: 30°14′47″N 51°11′57″E
- Country: Iran
- Province: Kohgiluyeh and Boyer-Ahmad
- County: Basht
- Bakhsh: Basht
- Rural District: Babuyi

Population (2006)
  - Total: 80
- Time zone: UTC+3:30 (IRST)
  - Summer (DST): UTC+4:30 (IRDT)

Hajj Qalandar (Persian: حاج قلندر, also Romanized as Ḩājj Qalandar; also known as Ḩājjī Qalandar and Posht Kūh) is a village in Babuyi Rural District, Basht District, Basht County, Kohgiluyeh and Boyer-Ahmad Province, Iran. At the 2006 census, its population was 80, in 21 families.
