= Pazin (disambiguation) =

Pazin is a town in Istria County, Croatia.

Pazin may also refer to:

- Pazin, Iran, a village in Iran
- Pazin (surname), a surname
