= Mowzar =

Mowzar موزار
- Village
- Location within Iran
- Coordinates: 28°15′36″N 53°49′25″E
- Country: Iran
- Province: Fars
- County: Larestan
- Bakhsh: Juyom
- Rural District: Juyom

Population (2006)
  - Total: 42
- Time zone: UTC+3:30 (IRST)
  - Summer (DST): UTC+4:30 (IRDT)

Mowzar (Persian: موزار, also Romanized as Mowzār) is a village in Juyom Rural District, Juyom District, Larestan County, Fars province, Iran. At the 2006 census, its population was 42, in 9 families.
