= Shahrak ol Mohammad =

Shahrak ol Mohammad شهرك ال محمد
- Village
- Country: Iran
- Province: Fars
- County: Larestan
- Bakhsh: Juyom
- Rural District: Harm

Population (2006)
  - Total: 355
- Time zone: UTC+3:30 (IRST)
  - Summer (DST): UTC+4:30 (IRDT)

Shahrak ol Mohammad (Persian: شهرك ال محمد, also Romanized as Shahrak ol Moḩammad) is a village in Harm Rural District, Juyom District, Larestan County, Fars province, Iran. In the 2006 census, the population of the village was 355 people in 70 different families.
