= Darreh Darreh-ye Olya =

Darreh Darreh-ye Olya دره دره عليا
- Village
- Location within Iran
- Coordinates: 30°15′14″N 51°11′19″E
- Country: Iran
- Province: Kohgiluyeh and Boyer-Ahmad
- County: Basht
- Bakhsh: Basht
- Rural District: Babuyi

Population (2006)
  - Total: 81
- Time zone: UTC+3:30 (IRST)
  - Summer (DST): UTC+4:30 (IRDT)

Darreh Darreh-ye Olya (Persian: دره دره عليا, also romanized as Darreh Darreh-ye 'Olyā; also known as Darreh Darreh) is a village in Babuyi Rural District, Basht District, Basht County, Kohgiluyeh and Boyer-Ahmad province, Iran. At the 2006 census, its population was 81, in 15 families.
