= Molk-e Ali =

Molk-e Ali ملك علي
- Village
- Location within Iran
- Coordinates: 28°19′05″N 53°48′59″E
- Country: Iran
- Province: Fars
- County: Larestan
- Bakhsh: Juyom
- Rural District: Juyom

Population (2006)
  - Total: 20
- Time zone: UTC+3:30 (IRST)
  - Summer (DST): UTC+4:30 (IRDT)

Molk-e Ali (Persian: ملك علي, also Romanized as Molk-e 'Alī) is a village in Juyom Rural District, Juyom District, Larestan County, Fars province, Iran. At the 2006 census, its population was 20, in 5 families.
