= Lirab =

Lirab (Persian: ليراب) may refer to:

- Lirab, Khuzestan
- Lirab, Basht, Kohgiluyeh and Boyer-Ahmad Province
- Lirab, Kohgiluyeh, Kohgiluyeh and Boyer-Ahmad Province
