= Qaleh Karimi =

Qaleh Karimi قلعه كريمي
- Village
- Location within Iran
- Coordinates: 28°18′38″N 53°58′31″E
- Country: Iran
- Province: Fars
- County: Larestan
- Bakhsh: Juyom
- Rural District: Juyom

Population (2006)
  - Total: 16
- Time zone: UTC+3:30 (IRST)
  - Summer (DST): UTC+4:30 (IRDT)

Qaleh Karimi (Persian: قلعه كريمي, also Romanized as Qal‘eh Karīmī) is a village in Juyom Rural District, Juyom District, Larestan County, Fars province, Iran. At the 2006 census, its population was 16, in 5 families.
