= Ahmad Mahmudi =

Ahmad Mahmudi احمدمحمودي
- Village
- Location within Iran
- Coordinates: 28°15′00″N 53°36′42″E
- Country: Iran
- Province: Fars
- County: Larestan
- Bakhsh: Juyom
- Rural District: Harm

Population (2006)
  - Total: 1,078
- Time zone: UTC+3:30 (IRST)
  - Summer (DST): UTC+4:30 (IRDT)

Ahmad Mahmudi (Persian: احمدمحمودي, also Romanized as Aḩmad Maḩmūdī) is a village in Harm Rural District, Juyom District, Larestan County, Fars province, Iran. At the 2006 census, its population was 1,078, in 221 families.
