= Tangab-e Shush =

Tangab-e Shush تنگ اب شوش
- Village
- Location within Iran
- Coordinates: 30°33′31″N 51°25′28″E
- Country: Iran
- Province: Kohgiluyeh and Boyer-Ahmad
- County: Basht
- Bakhsh: Basht
- Rural District: Babuyi

Population (2006)
  - Total: 57
- Time zone: UTC+3:30 (IRST)
  - Summer (DST): UTC+4:30 (IRDT)

Tangab-e Shush (Persian: تنگ اب شوش, also Romanized as Tangāb-e Shūsh; also known as Tangāb and Tangolāb) is a village in Babuyi Rural District, Basht District, Basht County, Kohgiluyeh and Boyer-Ahmad Province, Iran. At the 2006 census, its population was 57, in 12 families.
