= Khvordeh Darreh =

Khvordeh Darreh خورده دره
- Village
- Location within Iran
- Coordinates: 28°16′04″N 53°22′23″E
- Country: Iran
- Province: Fars
- County: Larestan
- Bakhsh: Juyom
- Rural District: Harm

Population (2006)
  - Total: 224
- Time zone: UTC+3:30 (IRST)
  - Summer (DST): UTC+4:30 (IRDT)

Khvordeh Darreh (Persian: خورده دره, also Romanized as Khowr Deh Darreh and Khowrdeh Darreh) is a village in Harm Rural District, Juyom District, Larestan County, Fars province, Iran. At the 2006 census, its population was 224, in 40 families.
