= Darreh Darreh =

Darreh Darreh (Persian: دره دره) may refer to:

- Darreh Darreh-ye Olya
- Darreh Darreh Rezaabad
