= Dasht-e Hasani-ye Yek =

Dasht-e Hasani-ye Yek دشت حسني1
- Village
- Country: Iran
- Province: Fars
- County: Larestan
- Bakhsh: Juyom
- Rural District: Juyom

Population (2006)
  - Total: 42
- Time zone: UTC+3:30 (IRST)
  - Summer (DST): UTC+4:30 (IRDT)

Dasht-e Hasani-ye Yek (Persian: دشت حسني1, also Romanized as Dasht-e Ḩasanī-ye Yek) is a village in Juyom Rural District, Juyom District, Larestan County, Fars province, Iran. At the 2006 census, its population was 42, in 9 families.
