= Emamzadeh Shah Gharib =

Emamzadeh Shah Gharib امامزاده شاه غريب
- Village
- Location within Iran
- Coordinates: 28°09′09″N 53°36′03″E
- Country: Iran
- Province: Fars
- County: Larestan
- Bakhsh: Juyom
- Rural District: Juyom

Population (2006)
  - Total: 25
- Time zone: UTC+3:30 (IRST)
  - Summer (DST): UTC+4:30 (IRDT)

Emamzadeh Shah Gharib (Persian: امامزاده شاه غريب, also Romanized as Emāmzādeh Shāh Gharīb; also known as Emāmzādeh Shāh-e Gheyb) is a village in Juyom Rural District, Juyom District, Larestan County, Fars province, Iran. At the 2006 census, its population was 25, in 5 families.
