= Kuhsarak =

Kuhsarak (Persian: كوه سرك) may refer to:

- Kuhsarak-e Olya
- Kuhsarak-e Sofla
