= Band Bast-e Bala =

Band Bast-e Bala بندبست بالا
- Village
- Location within Iran
- Coordinates: 28°17′55″N 53°13′47″E
- Country: Iran
- Province: Fars
- County: Larestan
- Bakhsh: Juyom
- Rural District: Harm

Population (2006)
  - Total: 28
- Time zone: UTC+3:30 (IRST)
  - Summer (DST): UTC+4:30 (IRDT)

Band Bast-e Bala (Persian: بندبست بالا, also Romanized as Band Bast-e Bālā; also known as Band Bast) is a village in Harm Rural District, Juyom District, Larestan County, Fars province, Iran. At the 2006 census, its population was 28, in 6 families.
