= Bolghan =

Village in Fars province, Iran

Bolghan Persian: بلغان
- Village
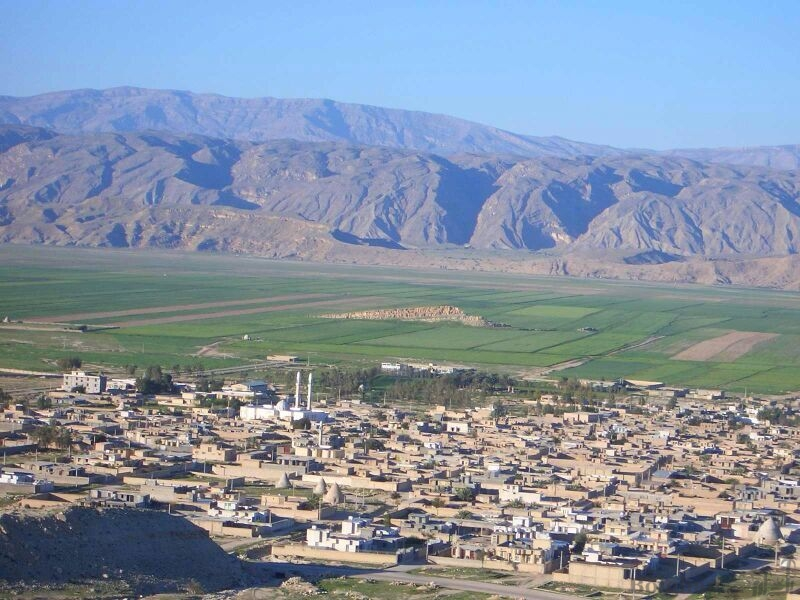
- View of the village of Bolghan in August 2014

- Location within Iran
- Coordinates: 28°09′04″N 53°36′09″E
- Country: Iran
- Province: Fars
- County: Juyom
- District: Harm
- Rural District: Harm

Population (2016)
  - Total: 3,640
- Time zone: UTC+3:30 (IRST)

Bolghan (Persian: بلغان) (Note: Also romanized as Bolghān) is a village in, and the former capital of, Harm Rural District of Harm District, Juyom County, Fars province, Iran, serving as capital of the district. The capital of the rural district has been transferred to the village of Harm.

== Geography ==
Bolgan is located in the northern part of Iran, north of the capital Tehran, in the foothills of the Zagros Mountains.

== Demographics ==
=== Population ===
At the time of the 2006 National Census, the village's population was 2,284 in 484 households, when it was in Juyom District (Note: Renamed the Central District of Juyom County) of Larestan County. (Note: Formerly Lar County) The following census in 2011 counted 4,216 people in 1,018 households. The 2016 census measured the population of the village as 3,640 people in 947 households. It was the most populous village in its rural district.

After the census, the district was separated from the county in the establishment of Juyom County and renamed the Central District. The rural district was transferred to the new Harm District.
