= Lirab, Basht =

Village in Kohgiluyeh and Boyer-Ahmad Province, Iran

Lirab ليراب
- Village
- Location within Iran
- Coordinates: 30°20′31″N 51°13′09″E
- Country: Iran
- Province: Kohgiluyeh and Boyer-Ahmad
- County: Basht
- Bakhsh: Basht
- Rural District: Babuyi

Population (2006)
  - Total: 260
- Time zone: UTC+3:30 (IRST)
  - Summer (DST): UTC+4:30 (IRDT)

Lirab (Persian: ليراب, also Romanized as Līrāb) is a village in Babuyi Rural District, Basht District, Basht County, Kohgiluyeh and Boyer-Ahmad Province, Iran. At the 2006 census, its population was 260, in 45 families.
