= Zirkuh (disambiguation) =

Zirkuh is a village in Kohgiluyeh and Boyer-Ahmad Province, Iran.

Zirkuh or Zir Kuh or Zir Kooh (Persian: زيركوه) may also refer to various places in Iran:

- Zir Kuh, Tabas, South Khorasan Province
- Zirkuh County, in South Khorasan Province
- Zirkuh Rural District (disambiguation)
