= Mansurabad, Juyom =

Village in Fars province, Iran

Mansurabad Persian: منصوراباد
- Village
- Location within Iran
- Coordinates: 28°15′20″N 54°02′11″E
- Country: Iran
- Province: Fars
- County: Juyom
- District: Central
- Rural District: Juyom

Population (2016)
  - Total: 2,412
- Time zone: UTC+3:30 (IRST)

Mansurabad (Persian: منصوراباد) (Note: Also romanized as Mansoor Abad and Manşūrābād) is a village in, and the capital of, Juyom Rural District of the Central District (Note: Formerly Juyom District of Larestan County) of Juyom County, Fars province, Iran. The previous capital of the rural district was the village of Juyom, now a city.

== Demographics ==
=== Population ===
At the time of the 2006 National Census, the village's population was 1,905 in 415 households, when it was in Juyom District (Note: Renamed the Central District of Juyom County) of Larestan County. (Note: Formerly Lar County) The following census in 2011 counted 2,266 people in 545 households. The 2016 census measured the population of the village as 2,412 people in 729 households. It was the most populous village in its rural district.

After the census, the district was separated from the county in the establishment of Juyom County and renamed the Central District.
