= Safi Qoli Caravansarai =

- کاروانسرای صفی قلی
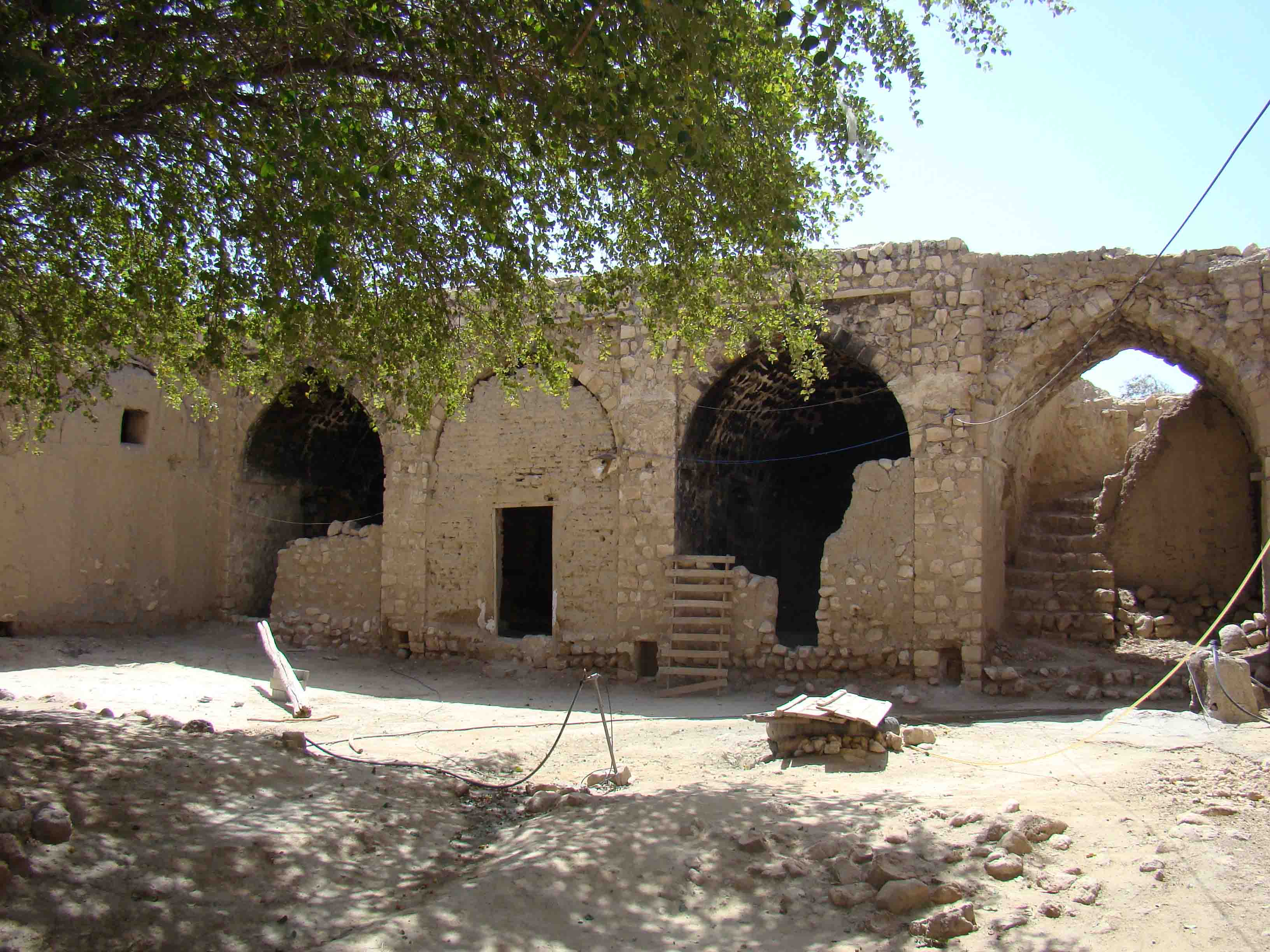

General information
- Type: Caravanserai
- Location: Juyom, Fars province, Iran

The Safi Qoli Caravansarai (Persian: کاروانسرای صفی قلی) is a historical caravanserai related to the Safavid dynasty and is located in Juyom.
