= Ab Konaru, Fars =

Ab Konaru اب كنارو
- Village
- Country: Iran
- Province: Fars
- County: Larestan
- Bakhsh: Juyom
- Rural District: Juyom

Population (2006)
  - Total: 54
- Time zone: UTC+3:30 (IRST)
  - Summer (DST): UTC+4:30 (IRDT)

Ab Konaru (Persian: اب كنارو, also Romanized as Āb Konārū) is a village in Juyom Rural District, Juyom District, Larestan County, Fars province, Iran. At the 2006 census, its population was 54, in 12 families.
