= Karyan Rural District =

Rural district in Fars province, Iran

Karyan Rural District Persian: دهستان کاریان
- Rural District
- Location within Iran
- Coordinates: 28°09′N 53°36′E
- Country: Iran
- Province: Fars
- County: Juyom
- District: Harm
- Capital: Karyan
- Time zone: UTC+3:30 (IRST)

Karyan Rural District (Persian: دهستان کاریان) is in Harm District of Juyom County, Fars province, Iran. Its capital is the village of Karyan, whose population at the time of the 2016 National Census was 2,919 in 749 households.

== History ==
After the census, Juyom District (Note: Renamed the Central District of Juyom County) was separated from Larestan County (Note: Formerly Lar County) in the establishment of Juyom County and renamed the Central District. Karyan Rural District was created in the new Harm District.
