= Shah Bahram =

Shah Bahram (Persian: شاه بهرام) may refer to:

- Shah Bahram, Fars
- Shah Bahram, Kavar, Fars Province
- Shah Bahram, Kohgiluyeh and Boyer-Ahmad
