= Sarab Biz Rural District =

Rural district in Kohgiluyeh and Boyer-Ahmad province, Iran

Sarab Biz Rural District Persian: دهستان سرابيز
- Rural District
- Location within Iran
- Coordinates: 30°24′55″N 51°07′39″E
- Country: Iran
- Province: Kohgiluyeh and Boyer-Ahmad
- County: Basht
- District: Central
- Capital: Sarab Biz

Population (2016)
  - Total: 2,475
- Time zone: UTC+3:30 (IRST)

Sarab Biz Rural District (Persian: دهستان سرابيز) is in the Central District of Basht County, Kohgiluyeh and Boyer-Ahmad province, Iran. Its capital is the village of Sarab Biz.

== History ==
After the 2006 National Census, Basht District was separated from Gachsaran County in the establishment of Basht County, and Sarab Biz Rural District was created in the new Central District.

== Demographics ==
=== Population ===
At the time of the 2011 census, the rural district's population was 2,924 in 635 households. The 2016 census measured the population of the rural district as 2,475 in 635 households. The most populous of its 25 villages was Sarab Biz, with 755 people.
