= Vehicle registration plates of Kohgiluyeh and Boyer-Ahmad =

Kohgiluyeh and Boyer-Ahmad vehicle license plates

Kohgiluyeh and Boyer-Ahmad's code is 49. In public cars, Taxis and Governal cars the letter is always the same. But in simple cars this letter (ب) depends on the city.

۱۲ ۳۴۵	۴۹

City	Letter
Boyer-Ahmad (Yasuj)	ب-ج-د-س
Gachsaran; Basht	ص
Kohgiluyeh (Dehdasht); Charam; Bahmai (Likak)	ط
Dena	ق
