= Bustan, Kohgiluyeh and Boyer-Ahmad =

City in Kohgiluyeh and Boyer-Ahmad province, Iran

Bustan Persian: بوستان
- City
- Location within Iran
- Coordinates: 30°19′25″N 51°12′00″E
- Country: Iran
- Province: Kohgiluyeh and Boyer-Ahmad
- County: Basht
- District: Bustan

Population (2016)
  - Total: 1,248
- Time zone: UTC+3:30 (IRST)

Bustan (Persian: بوستان) (Note: Also romanized as Būstān; also known as Bostān Bozorg, Bushan, and Būstān-e Bozorg) is a city in, and the capital of, Bustan District of Basht County, Kohgiluyeh and Boyer-Ahmad province, Iran. It also serves as the administrative center for Babuyi Rural District, previously administered from the city of Basht.

== Demographics ==
=== Population ===
At the time of the 2006 National Census, Bustan's population was 1,019 in 188 households, when it was a village in Babuyi Rural District of the former Basht District of Gachsaran County. The following census in 2011 counted 1,092 people in 265 households, by which time the district had been separated from the county in the establishment of Basht County. The rural district was transferred to the new Bustan District. The 2016 census measured the population of the village as 1,248 people in 337 households. It was the most populous village in its rural district.

After the census, Bustan was elevated to the status of a city.
