= Bala Kuh, Fars =

Bala Kuh بالا كوه
- Village
- Location within Iran
- Coordinates: 28°16′28″N 53°46′04″E
- Country: Iran
- Province: Fars
- County: Larestan
- Bakhsh: Juyom
- Rural District: Juyom

Population (2006)
  - Total: 90
- Time zone: UTC+3:30 (IRST)
  - Summer (DST): UTC+4:30 (IRDT)

Bala Kuh (Persian: بالا كوه, also Romanized as Bālā Kūh) is a village in Juyom Rural District, Juyom District, Larestan County, Fars province, Iran. At the 2006 census, its population was 90, in 16 families.
