= Tang Ab, Larestan =

Tang Ab تنگ اب
- Village
- Location within Iran
- Coordinates: 28°24′41″N 53°45′48″E
- Country: Iran
- Province: Fars
- County: Larestan
- Bakhsh: Juyom
- Rural District: Juyom

Population (2006)
  - Total: 303
- Time zone: UTC+3:30 (IRST)
  - Summer (DST): UTC+4:30 (IRDT)

Tang Ab (Persian: تنگ اب, also Romanized as Tang Āb) is a village in Juyom Rural District, Juyom District, Larestan County, Fars province, Iran. At the 2006 census, its population was 303, in 60 families.
