= Sheykhha =

Sheykhha (Persian: شيخ ها) may refer to:

- Sheykhha, Kohgiluyeh and Boyer-Ahmad, in southwestern Iran
- Sheykhha, Razavi Khorasan, in northeastern Iran on the Turkmenistan border
