= Talkhab Rural District =

Rural district in Kohgiluyeh and Boyer-Ahmad province, Iran

Talkhab Rural District Persian: دهستان تلخاب
- Rural District
- Location within Iran
- Coordinates: 30°26′46″N 51°11′32″E
- Country: Iran
- Province: Kohgiluyeh and Boyer-Ahmad
- County: Basht
- District: Bustan
- Capital: Chah Talkhab-e Olya

Population (2016)
  - Total: 1,600
- Time zone: UTC+3:30 (IRST)

Talkhab Rural District (Persian: دهستان تلخاب) is in Bustan District of Basht County, Kohgiluyeh and Boyer-Ahmad province, Iran. Its capital is the village of Chah Talkhab-e Olya.

== History ==
After the 2006 National Census, Basht District was separated from Gachsaran County in the establishment of Basht County, and Talkhab Rural District was created in the new Bustan District.

== Demographics ==
=== Population ===
At the time of the 2011 census, the rural district's population was 1,826 in 424 households. The 2016 census measured the population of the rural district as 1,600 in 430 households. The most populous of its 20 villages was Bahrehana, with 524 people.
