= Bala Kuh, Iran =

Bala Kuh or Balakuh (Persian: بالا كوه) in Iran may refer to:

- Bala Kuh, Fars
- Bala Kuh, Zanjan
