= Chaghan Rural District =

Rural district in Fars province, Iran

Chaghan Rural District Persian: دهستان چغان
- Rural District
- Location within Iran
- Coordinates: 28°14′09″N 53°42′31″E
- Country: Iran
- Province: Fars
- County: Juyom
- District: Central
- Capital: Chaghan
- Time zone: UTC+3:30 (IRST)

Chaghan Rural District (Persian: دهستان چغان) is in the Central District (Note: Formerly Juyom District of Larestan County) of Juyom County, Fars province, Iran. Its capital is the village of Chaghan, whose population at the time of the 2016 National Census was 1,630 in 394 households.

== History ==
After the 2016 census, Juyom District (Note: Renamed the Central District of Juyom County) was separated from Larestan County (Note: Formerly Lar County) in the establishment of Juyom County and renamed the Central District. Chaghan Rural District was created in the district.
