= Gazanfar Khaligov =

Soviet painter (1898-1981)

- Azerbaijani: Qəzənfər Xalıqov
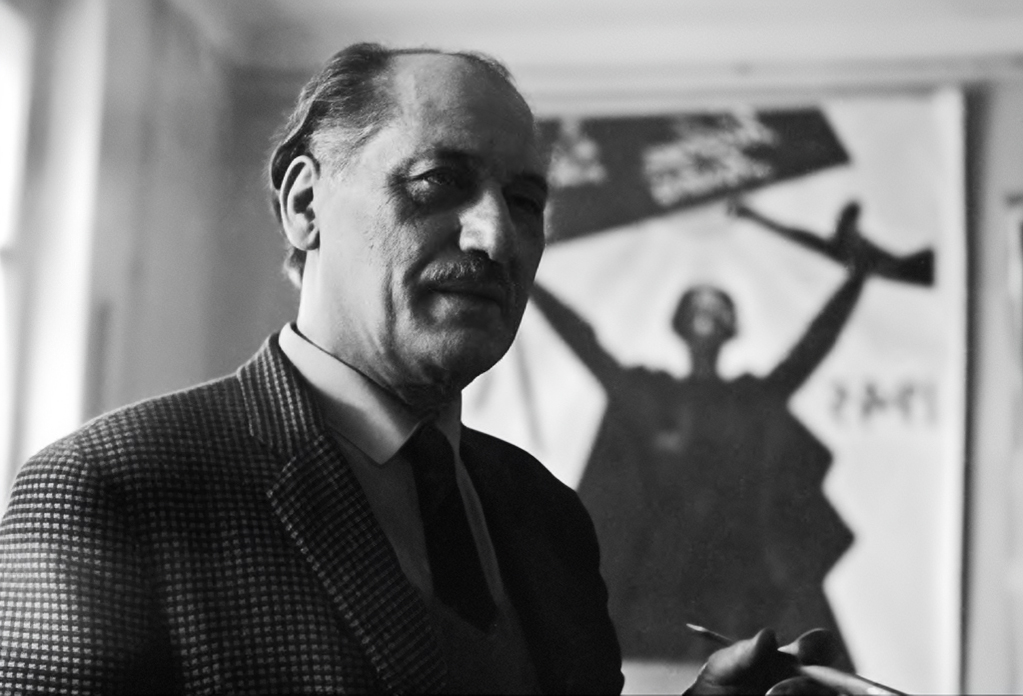
- Born: December 16, 1898; Baku, Russian Empire
- Died: March 1, 1981 (aged 82); Baku, Azerbaijan SSR, Soviet Union
- Education: Azerbaijan State Art College
- Known for: Painter
- Awards: People's Artist of the Azerbaijan SSR Honored Art Worker of the Azerbaijan SSR Order of the Red Banner of Labour Order of the Badge of Honour

Gazanfar Alakbar oghlu Khaligov (Azerbaijani: Qəzənfər Ələkbər oğlu Xalıqov, December 16, 1898–March 1, 1981) was a Soviet and Azerbaijani painter, People's Painter of the Azerbaijan SSR.

== Biography ==
Gazanfar Khaligov was born in Baku. He graduated from Azerbaijan State Art College in 1928.

He worked as a cartoonist in "Molla Nasraddin" in 1929–1930, in "Kirpi" magazine in 1953-1958 and "Ganj Ishchi" newspaper. In 1934, he created "Ferdowsi's Funeral" for the exhibition dedicated to the 1000th anniversary of Ferdowsi. In 1940, he became the first artist to create a portrait of Nizami Ganjavi by creating "Portrait of Nizami" in connection with the 800th anniversary of the poet. He gave the stage and costume design of the performances as "Leyli and Majnun", "Asli and Karam". He is the author of a number of posters, theatrical sketches, graphic series ("Oil").

G. Khaligov died on March 1, 1981, in Baku. A secondary school and a street were named in honor of Gazanfar Khaligov in Gobu village of Absheron District. "Khosrov and Shirin" (1940), "Iskendername" (1953) watercolors are kept in the National Art Museum of Azerbaijan, "Portrait of Nizami" in the Nizami Museum of Azerbaijani Literature, and 17 works in the fund of the Azerbaijan State Art Gallery.

== Awards ==
- Honored Art Worker of the Azerbaijan SSR — April 23, 1940
- People's Painter of the Azerbaijan SSR — October 12, 1973
- Order of the Badge of Honour — June 9, 1959
- Order of the Red Banner of Labour – 1978

== Sources ==
- Azərbaycan Rəssamları haqqında qısa məlumat kitabçası. Baku: Azerbaijan State Art Gallery. 2017.
