= Hajj Qalandar, Kerman =

Hajj Qalandar حاج قلندر
- Village
- Location within Iran
- Coordinates: 29°26′03″N 56°22′23″E
- Country: Iran
- Province: Kerman
- County: Baft
- Bakhsh: Central
- Rural District: Gughar

Population (2006)
  - Total: 25
- Time zone: UTC+3:30 (IRST)
  - Summer (DST): UTC+4:30 (IRDT)

Hajj Qalandar (Persian: حاج قلندر, also Romanized as Ḩājj Qalandar and Ḩājqalandar) is a village in Gughar Rural District, in the Central District of Baft County, Kerman Province, Iran. At the 2006 census, its population was 25, in 8 families.
