= Basht =

City in Kohgiluyeh and Boyer-Ahmad province, Iran

Basht Persian: باشت
- City
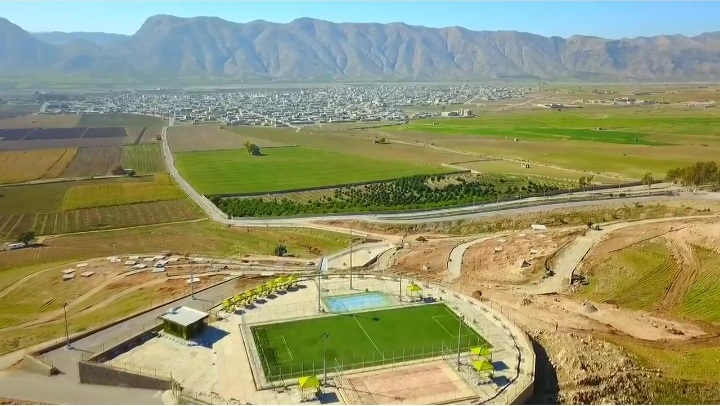

- Location within Iran
- Coordinates: 30°21′40″N 51°09′21″E
- Country: Iran
- Province: Kohgiluyeh and Boyer-Ahmad
- County: Basht
- District: Central

Population (2016)
  - Total: 10,764
- Time zone: UTC+3:30 (IRST)
- Area code: 0744

Basht (Persian: باشت) (Note: Also romanized as Bāsht) is a city in the Central District of Basht County, Kohgiluyeh and Boyer-Ahmad province, Iran, serving as capital of both the county and the district. It was the administrative center for Babuyi Rural District until its capital was transferred to the village of Bustan, now a city.

== Demographics ==
=== Population ===
At the time of the 2006 National Census, the city's population was 8,269 in 1,561 households, when it was capital of the former Basht District of Gachsaran County. The following census in 2011 counted 9,266 people in 2,261 households, by which time the district had separated from the county in the establishment of Basht County. Basht was transferred to the new Central District as the county's capital. The 2016 census measured the population of the city as 10,764 people in 2,831 households.
