= Ab Kenaru, Charam =

Ab Kenaru اب كنارو
- Village
- Location within Iran
- Coordinates: 30°44′37″N 50°49′11″E
- Country: Iran
- Province: Kohgiluyeh and Boyer-Ahmad
- County: Charam
- Bakhsh: Central
- Rural District: Charam

Population (2006)
  - Total: 56
- Time zone: UTC+3:30 (IRST)
  - Summer (DST): UTC+4:30 (IRDT)

Ab Kenaru (Persian: اب كنارو, also Romanized as Āb Kenārū; also known as Āb Kenārūn) is a village in Charam Rural District, in the Central District of Charam County, Kohgiluyeh and Boyer-Ahmad Province, Iran. At the 2006 census, its population was 56, in 11 families.
