= Tangab-e Sardar =

Tangab-e Sardar تنگ اب سردار
- Village
- Location within Iran
- Coordinates: 30°33′39″N 51°25′07″E
- Country: Iran
- Province: Kohgiluyeh and Boyer-Ahmad
- County: Boyer-Ahmad
- Bakhsh: Central
- Rural District: Sepidar

Population (2006)
  - Total: 27
- Time zone: UTC+3:30 (IRST)
  - Summer (DST): UTC+4:30 (IRDT)

Tangab-e Sardar (Persian: تنگ اب سردار, also Romanized as Tangāb-e Sardār; also known as Tangāb) is a village in Sepidar Rural District, in the Central District of Boyer-Ahmad County, Kohgiluyeh and Boyer-Ahmad Province, Iran. At the 2006 census, its population was 27, in 8 families.
