= Darreh Goru Firuzabad =

Darreh Goru Firuzabad دره گروفيروزاباد
- Village
- Location within Iran
- Coordinates: 30°43′38″N 51°26′11″E
- Country: Iran
- Province: Kohgiluyeh and Boyer-Ahmad
- County: Boyer-Ahmad
- Bakhsh: Central
- Rural District: Sarrud-e Jonubi

Population (2006)
  - Total: 221
- Time zone: UTC+3:30 (IRST)
  - Summer (DST): UTC+4:30 (IRDT)

Darreh Goru Firuzabad (Persian: دره گروفيروزاباد, also Romanized as Darreh Gorū Fīrūzābād; also known as Darreh Gorū, Deh Bozorg, and Dergepū) is a village in Sarrud-e Jonubi Rural District, in the Central District of Boyer-Ahmad County, Kohgiluyeh and Boyer-Ahmad Province, Iran. At the 2006 census, its population was 221, in 55 families.
