= Gazanfar Akbarov =

Soviet Azerbaijani Red Army senior sergeant (1917–1944)

Gazanfar Gulam oglu Akbarov
- Qəzənfər Qulam oğlu Əkbərov
- Born: 4 April 1917; Cəhri, Nakhichevansky Uyezd, Erivan Governorate
- Died: 3 August 1944 (aged 27); Derevni Nadma, Masovian Voivodeship, Poland
- Military career
- Allegiance: Soviet Union
- Branch: Red Army
- Service years: 1941–1944
- Rank: Senior sergeant
- Units: 41st Anti-Tank Artillery Brigade, 2nd Tank Army
- Conflicts: World War II; Battle of the Caucasus; Lublin-Brest Offensive
- Awards: Hero of the Soviet Union

Gazanfar Gulam oglu Akbarov (Azerbaijani: Qəzənfər Qulam oğlu Əkbərov; 4 April 1917 – 3 August 1944) was an Azerbaijani Red Army senior sergeant and a posthumous Hero of the Soviet Union. Akbarov was awarded the title on 26 October 1944 for his actions in the Lublin–Brest Offensive. Akbarov was reported to have destroyed two tanks with his anti-tank gun and continued to fight while wounded. He was killed in action.

== Early life ==
Akbarov was born on 4 April 1917 in Cəhri to a peasant family. In the spring of 1941, he graduated from the Nakhchivan Teacher Institute. He then worked as director of the Qoşadizə Junior High School.

== World War II ==
Akbarov was drafted into the Red Army in June 1941. He graduated from the regimental school and fought in combat from August. Akbarov fought in the Battle of the Caucasus. For his actions, he was awarded the Order of the Red Star on 11 July 1944 and the Medal "For Courage" on 13 January 1944. In 1944, he became a Communist Party of the Soviet Union member. Akbarov became a senior sergeant and anti-tank gun commander of the 1959th Anti-Tank Artillery Regiment, part of the 2nd Tank Army's 41st Anti-Tank Artillery Brigade.

Akbarov fought in the Lublin–Brest Offensive. On 3 August near the village of Derevni Nadma, he was involved in an engagement with German tanks. With guns and anti-tank grenades, the crew reportedly destroyed four tanks and about 100 German soldiers. Akbarov reportedly destroyed two tanks and was wounded. He continued to fight and was killed in the engagement. Akbarov was buried in the village. On 26 October, he was awarded the title Hero of the Soviet Union and the Order of Lenin for his actions.

== Awards ==
- Order of Lenin
- Order of the Red Star
- Medal "For Bravery"

== Legacy ==
A boarding school and tobacco farm in Nakhchivan were named for Akbarov. There is a monument in Cəhri and a plaque at the house where he lived.
