= Azerbaijan State Art Gallery =

Art museum

- Azərbaycan Dövlət Rəsm Qalereyası
- Established: 1972
- Location: Baku, Azerbaijan
- Coordinates: 40.36314°N 49.83180°E
- Director: Galib Gasimov
- Website: http://azgallery.az

Azerbaijan State Art Gallery is an organization for preservation and restoration of Azerbaijan's cultural heritage.

== About ==
Azerbaijan State Art Gallery was established in 1974 by the Ministry of Culture of the Azerbaijan SSR on the basis of Azerbaijan State Exhibition Hall operating since 1960. The majority of exhibitions in Azerbaijan and abroad are mainly composed of the works stored in the gallery. The gallery has more than 14,000 paintings, graphics, sculptures, decorative and applied arts and contemporary art examples.

Examination of exhibitions, contests, research works of art and collecting information about artists is carried out by the gallery's research staff. Artists' workshops, master classes and mobile exhibitions of young artists are organized in the regions to increase interest in fine arts and discover new talents.

The main activities of the gallery:

- Participation in the formation and implementation of a unified state policy in the relevant field
- Prepare analytical materials on the current situation and prospects of the fine arts and decorative-applied arts, recommendations for their development and introduce them to the Ministry
- Preservation and restoration of cultural heritage of Azerbaijan

On October 27, 2017, at the Museum Center, the Unified Information Database of Azerbaijani artists and the gallery's website (www.azgallery.az) was presented with the organization of the Ministry of Culture of the Republic of Azerbaijan and the State Art Gallery of Azerbaijan. Also in 2017, young designer Aysel Alizade prepared the logo of the State Art Gallery and presented the logo on May 2 at the Museum Center.
