= Zirkuh Rural District =

Zirkuh Rural District (Persian: دهستان زيركوه) may refer to:

- Zirkuh Rural District (Isfahan Province)
- Zirkuh Rural District (Zirkuh County), South Khorasan province
