= Cheshmeh Darreh, Lorestan =

Cheshmeh Darreh چشمه دره
- Village
- Location within Iran
- Coordinates: 33°17′06″N 48°53′58″E
- Country: Iran
- Province: Lorestan
- County: Khorramabad
- Bakhsh: Papi
- Rural District: Sepiddasht

Population (2006)
  - Total: 160
- Time zone: UTC+3:30 (IRST)
  - Summer (DST): UTC+4:30 (IRDT)

Cheshmeh Darreh (Persian: چشمه دره, also Romanized as Cheshmeh Darreh and Cheshmeh-ye Darreh) is a village in Sepiddasht Rural District, Papi District, Khorramabad County, Lorestan Province, Iran. At the 2006 census, its population was 160, in 24 families.
