= Darreh Darreh Rezaabad =

Darreh Darreh Rezaabad دره دره رضااباد
- Village
- Location within Iran
- Coordinates: 30°33′39″N 51°42′01″E
- Country: Iran
- Province: Kohgiluyeh and Boyer-Ahmad
- County: Boyer-Ahmad
- Bakhsh: Central
- Rural District: Sarrud-e Jonubi

Population (2006)
  - Total: 13
- Time zone: UTC+3:30 (IRST)
  - Summer (DST): UTC+4:30 (IRDT)

Darreh Darreh Rezaabad (Persian: دره دره رضااباد, also Romanized as Darreh Darreh Rez̤āābād; also known as Darreh Darreh) is a village in Sarrud-e Jonubi Rural District, in the Central District of Boyer-Ahmad County, Kohgiluyeh and Boyer-Ahmad Province, Iran. At the 2006 census, its population was 13, in 5 families.
