= Tangab, Gilan =

Tangab تنگاب
- Village
- Location within Iran
- Coordinates: 37°49′24″N 48°47′25″E
- Country: Iran
- Province: Gilan
- County: Talesh
- Bakhsh: Central
- Rural District: Kuhestani-ye Talesh

Population (2006)
  - Total: 163
- Time zone: UTC+3:30 (IRST)
  - Summer (DST): UTC+4:30 (IRDT)

Tangab (Persian: تنگاب, also Romanized as Tangāb; also known as Tangāb-e Avval) is a village in Kuhestani-ye Talesh Rural District, in the Central District of Talesh County, Gilan Province, Iran. At the 2006 census, its population was 163, in 42 families.
