= Pazin (surname) =

Pazin is a surname. Notable people with the surname include:

- Đorđe Pažin (born 2001), Serbian basketball player
- Predrag Pažin (born 1973), Bulgarian footballer
- Zoran Pažin (born 1966), Montenegrin politician
- Andrei Pazin (born 1986), Russian football player
