= Pareshkaft-e Darb Kalat =

Pareshkaft-e Darb Kalat پراشكفت درب كلات
- Village
- Location within Iran
- Coordinates: 31°07′28″N 51°06′24″E
- Country: Iran
- Province: Kohgiluyeh and Boyer-Ahmad
- County: Dana
- Bakhsh: Pataveh
- Rural District: Sadat Mahmudi

Population (2006)
  - Total: 101
- Time zone: UTC+3:30 (IRST)
  - Summer (DST): UTC+4:30 (IRDT)

Pareshkaft-e Darb Kalat (Persian: پراشكفت درب كلات, also Romanized as Pareshkaft-e Darb Kalāt; also known as Bar Eshgaft, Pareshkaft, and Pīr Eshkaft) is a village in Sadat Mahmudi Rural District, Pataveh District, Dana County, Kohgiluyeh and Boyer-Ahmad Province, Iran. At the 2006 census, its population was 101, in 25 families.
