= Bustan District =

District in Kohgiluyeh and Boyer-Ahmad province, Iran

Bustan District Persian: بخش بوستان
- District
- Location within Iran
- Coordinates: 30°22′53″N 51°11′47″E
- Country: Iran
- Province: Kohgiluyeh and Boyer-Ahmad
- County: Basht
- Capital: Bustan

Population (2016)
  - Total: 5,941
- Time zone: UTC+3:30 (IRST)

Bustan District (Persian: بخش بوستان) is in Basht County, Kohgiluyeh and Boyer-Ahmad province, Iran. Its capital is the city of Bustan.

== History ==
After the 2006 National Census, Basht District was separated from Gachsaran County in the establishment of Basht County, which was divided into two districts of two rural districts each, with Basht as its capital and only city at the time. After the 2016 census, the village of Bustan was elevated to the status of a city.

== Demographics ==
=== Population ===
At the time of the 2011 census, the district's population was 6,059 in 1,497 households. The 2016 census measured the population of the district as 5,941 inhabitants in 1,665 households.

=== Administrative divisions ===
Bustan District Population
Administrative Divisions	2011	2016
Babuyi RD	4,233	4,341
Talkhab RD	1,826	1,600
Bustan (city) (Note: Became a city after the 2016 census)		
Total	6,059	5,941
RD = Rural District
