= Cheshmeh Darreh-ye Amirabad =

Village in Kohgiluyeh and Boyer-Ahmad, Iran

Cheshmeh Darreh-ye Amirabad چشمه دره اميراباد
- Village
- Location within Iran
- Coordinates: 31°03′54″N 50°56′52″E
- Country: Iran
- Province: Kohgiluyeh and Boyer-Ahmad
- County: Boyer-Ahmad
- Bakhsh: Margown
- Rural District: Margown

Population (2006)
  - Total: 155
- Time zone: UTC+3:30 (IRST)
  - Summer (DST): UTC+4:30 (IRDT)

Cheshmeh Darreh-ye Amirabad (Persian: چشمه دره اميراباد, also Romanized as Cheshmeh Darreh-ye Amīrābād; also known as Cheshmeh Darreh) is a village in Margown Rural District, Margown District, Boyer-Ahmad County, Kohgiluyeh and Boyer-Ahmad Province, Iran. At the 2006 census, its population was 155, in 26 families.
