= Talkhab-e Olya, Fars =

Talkhab-e Olya تلخاب عليا
- Village
- Location within Iran
- Coordinates: 30°26′13″N 51°18′22″E
- Country: Iran
- Province: Fars
- County: Rostam
- Bakhsh: Sorna
- Rural District: Poshtkuh-e Rostam

Population (2006)
  - Total: 97
- Time zone: UTC+3:30 (IRST)
  - Summer (DST): UTC+4:30 (IRDT)

Talkhab-e Olya (Persian: تلخاب عليا, also Romanized as Talkhāb-e 'Olyā) is a village in Poshtkuh-e Rostam Rural District, Sorna District, Rostam County, Fars province, Iran. At the 2006 census, its population was 97, in 21 families.
