= Lirab, Khuzestan =

Lirab ليراب
- Village
- Location within Iran
- Coordinates: 31°51′58″N 50°03′02″E
- Country: Iran
- Province: Khuzestan
- County: Izeh
- Bakhsh: Central
- Rural District: Howmeh-ye Sharqi

Population (2006)
  - Total: 53
- Time zone: UTC+3:30 (IRST)
  - Summer (DST): UTC+4:30 (IRDT)

Lirab (Persian: ليراب, also Romanized as Līrāb) is a village in Howmeh-ye Sharqi Rural District, in the Central District of Izeh County, Khuzestan Province, Iran. At the 2006 census, its population was 53, in 9 families.
