= Juyom =

City in Fars province, Iran

Juyom Persian: جویم
- City
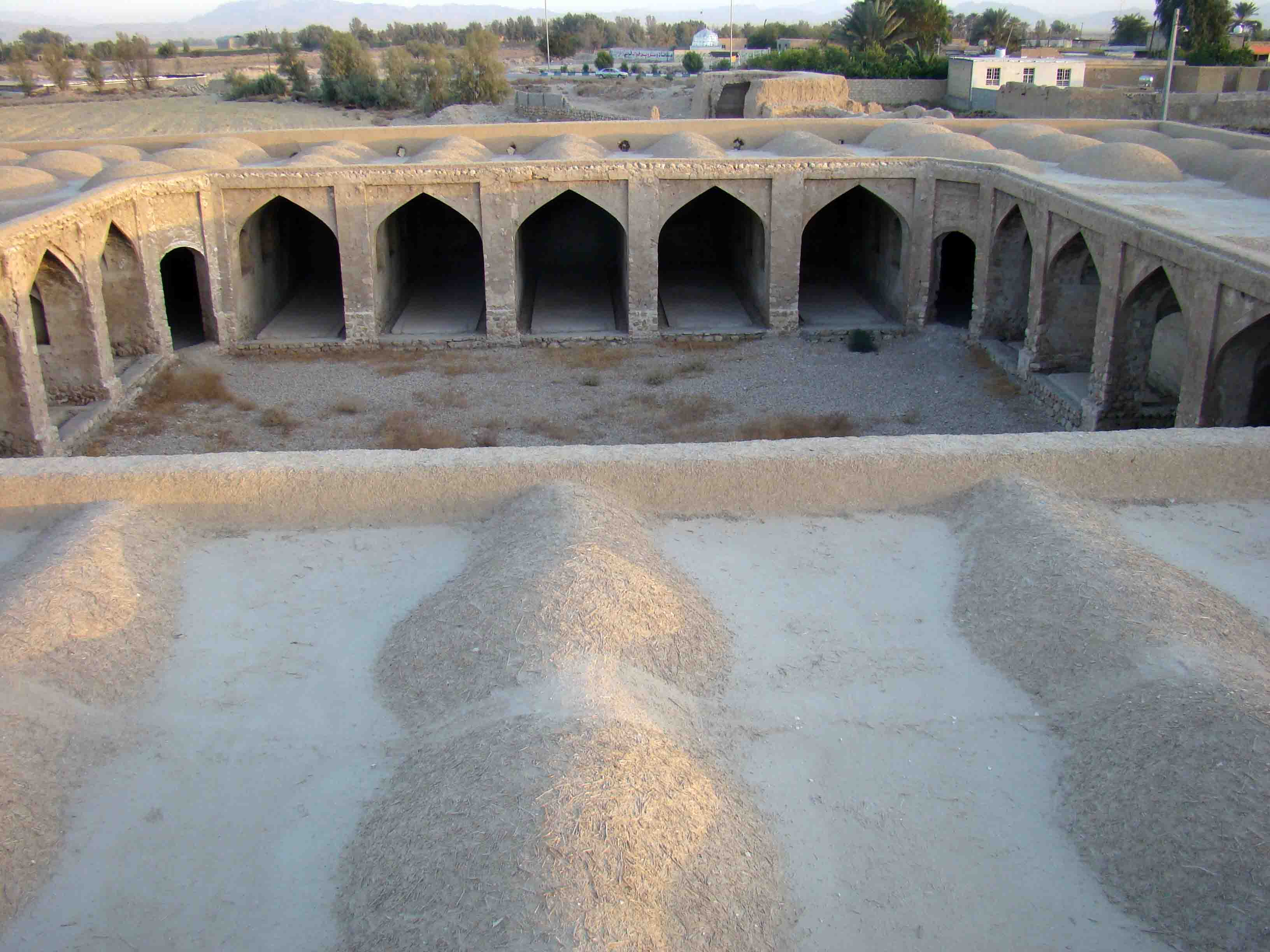
- Khaje Aboulhasan Caravanserai of Juyom

- Location within Iran
- Coordinates: 28°15′36″N 53°58′50″E
- Country: Iran
- Province: Fars
- County: Juyom
- District: Central

Population (2016)
  - Total: 8,010
- Time zone: UTC+3:30 (IRST)

Juyom (Persian: جویم) (Note: Also romanized as Jūyom; also known as Juwūn, Jūyum, and Zhoyūm) is a city in the Central District (Note: Formerly Juyom District of Larestan County) of Juyom County, Fars province, Iran, serving as capital of both the county and the district. As a village, Juyom was the capital of Juyom Rural District until its capital was transferred to the village of Mansurabad.

== Demographics ==
=== Population ===
At the time of the 2006 National Census, the city's population was 6,396 in 1,397 households, when it was in Juyom District (Note: Renamed the Central District of Juyom County) of Larestan County. (Note: Formerly Lar County) The following census in 2011 counted 8,810 people in 2,107 households. The 2016 census measured the population of the city as 8,010 people in 2,434 households.

After the census, the district was separated from the county in the establishment of Juyom County and renamed the Central District, with Juyom as the new county's capital.
