= Harm District =

District in Fars province, Iran

Harm District Persian: بخش هرم
- District
- Location within Iran
- Coordinates: 28°09′15″N 53°26′15″E
- Country: Iran
- Province: Fars
- County: Juyom
- Capital: Bolghan
- Time zone: UTC+3:30 (IRST)

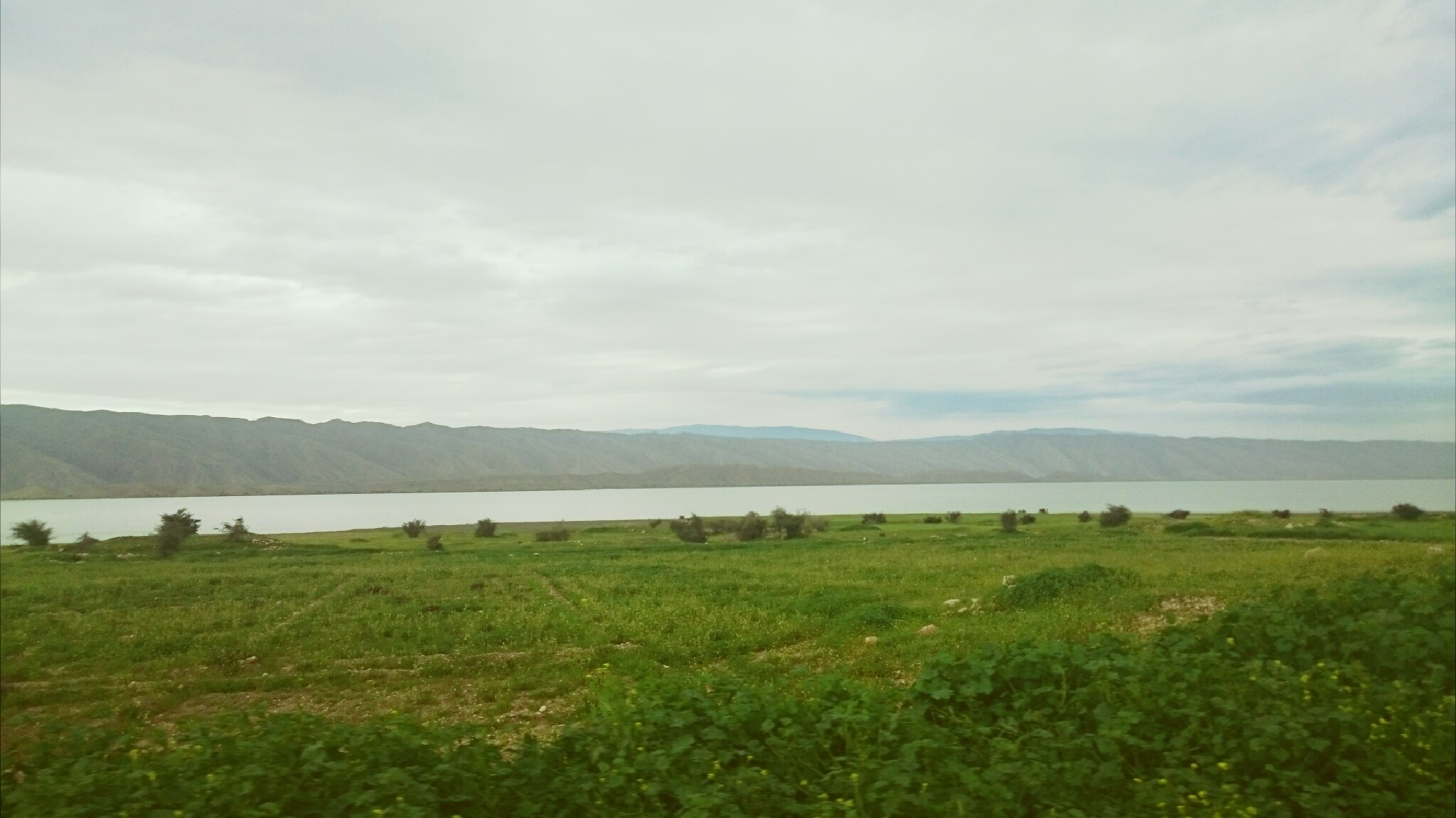
Basseri nomads' district in Harm, Larestan and a view of Harm lake

Harm District (Persian: بخش هرم) is in Juyom County, Fars province, Iran. Its capital is the village of Bolghan, whose population at the time of the 2016 National Census was 3,640 people in 947 households.

== History ==
After the census, Juyom District (Note: Renamed the Central District of Juyom County) was separated from Larestan County (Note: Formerly Lar County) in the establishment of Juyom County and renamed the Central District. The new county was divided into two districts of two rural districts each, with Juyom as its capital and only city at the time.

== Demographics ==
=== Administrative divisions ===
Harm District
Administrative Divisions
Harm RD
Karyan RD
RD = Rural District
