= Deh Bozorg-e Pereshkaft =

Pereshkaft پراشكفت
- Village
- Location within Iran
- Coordinates: 30°42′37″N 51°16′37″E
- Country: Iran
- Province: Kohgiluyeh and Boyer-Ahmad
- County: Boyer-Ahmad
- Bakhsh: Central
- Rural District: Dasht-e Rum

Population (2006)
  - Total: 229
- Time zone: UTC+3:30 (IRST)
  - Summer (DST): UTC+4:30 (IRDT)

Pereshkaft (Persian: پراشكفت; also known as Pereshgaft, Pīr Ashkān, and Pīr Eshkaft) is a village in Dasht-e Rum Rural District, in the Central District of Boyer-Ahmad County, Kohgiluyeh and Boyer-Ahmad Province, Iran. At the 2006 census, its population was 229, in 50 families.
