= Juyom County =

County in Fars province, Iran

Juyom County Persian: شهرستان جویم
- County
- Location of Juyom County in Fars province (bottom center, purple)

- Location of Fars province in Iran
- Coordinates: 28°12′N 53°42′E
- Country: Iran
- Province: Fars
- Capital: Juyom
- Districts: Central, Harm
- Time zone: UTC+3:30 (IRST)

Juyom County (Persian: شهرستان جویم) is in Fars province, Iran. Its capital is the city of Juyom, whose population at the time of the 2016 National Census was 8,010 in 2,434 households.

== History ==
After the 2016 census, Juyom District (Note: Renamed the Central District of Juyom County) was separated from Larestan County (Note: Formerly Lar County) in the establishment of Juyom County and renamed the Central District. The new county was divided into two districts of two rural districts each, with Juyom as its capital and only city at the time.

== Demographics ==
=== Administrative divisions ===
Juyom County's administrative structure is shown in the following table.

Juyom County
Administrative Divisions
Central District (Note: Formerly Juyom District of Larestan County)
Chaghan RD
Juyom RD
Juyom (city)
Harm District
Harm RD
Karyan RD
RD = Rural District

== Geography ==
Juyom Rural District is the richest part of the county in terms of water abundance. The largest seasonal lake of the province (with an area of 130 square kilometers) known as Pyramid Lake is located here.

There are a total of 37 large and small springs in this section, the largest of which is called Sarcheshmeh, with a flow rate of 250 liters per second. Thirty-six aqueducts with a total length of 80 km irrigate agricultural fields and orchards. Over 200 agricultural wells and dozens of dolab wells have been identified in this sector.

The 200-meter waterfalls of Rahmatabad, 20 kilometers north of Joyom, are the only waterfalls in this county.

== See also ==
Media related to Juyom County at Wikimedia Commons
