= Harm Rural District =

Rural district in Fars province, Iran

Harm Rural District Persian: دهستان هرم
- Rural District
- Location within Iran
- Coordinates: 28°09′N 53°26′E
- Country: Iran
- Province: Fars
- County: Juyom
- District: Harm
- Capital: Harm

Population (2016)
  - Total: 12,202
- Time zone: UTC+3:30 (IRST)

Harm Rural District (Persian: دهستان هرم) is in Harm District of Juyom County, Fars province, Iran. Its capital is the village of Harm. The previous capital of the rural district was the village of Bolghan.

== Demographics ==
=== Population ===
At the time of the 2006 National Census, the rural district's population (as a part of Juyom District (Note: Renamed the Central District of Juyom County) in Larestan County (Note: Formerly Lar County)) was 8,992 in 1,781 households. There were 12,970 inhabitants in 3,169 households at the following census of 2011. The 2016 census measured the population of the rural district as 12,202 in 3,149 households. The most populous of its 24 villages was Bolghan, with 3,640 people.

After the census, the district was separated from the county in the establishment of Juyom County and renamed the Central District. The rural district was transferred to the new Harm District.
