= Juyom Rural District =

Rural district in Fars province, Iran

Juyom Rural District Persian: دهستان جويم
- Rural District
- Location within Iran
- Coordinates: 28°13′46″N 53°54′38″E
- Country: Iran
- Province: Fars
- County: Juyom
- District: Central
- Capital: Mansurabad

Population (2016)
  - Total: 4,869
- Time zone: UTC+3:30 (IRST)

Juyom Rural District (Persian: دهستان جويم) is in the Central District (Note: Formerly Juyom District of Larestan County) of Juyom County, Fars province, Iran. Its capital is the village of Mansurabad. The previous capital of the rural district was the village of Juyom, now a city.

== Demographics ==
=== Population ===
At the time of the 2006 National Census, the rural district's population (as a part of Juyom District (Note: Renamed the Central District of Juyom County) in Larestan County (Note: Formerly Lar County)) was 4,213 in 890 households. There were 6,303 inhabitants in 1,386 households at the following census of 2011. The 2016 census measured the population of the rural district as 4,869 in 1,394 households. The most populous of its 66 villages was Mansurabad, with 2,412 people.

After the census, the district was separated from the county in the establishment of Juyom County and renamed the Central District.
