= Central District (Juyom County) =

District in Fars province, Iran

Central District (Juyom County) Persian: بخش مرکزی شهرستان جویم
- District
- Location within Iran
- Coordinates: 28°13′50″N 53°52′04″E
- Country: Iran
- Province: Fars
- County: Juyom
- Capital: Juyom

Population (2016)
  - Total: 25,081 (Note: As Juyom District of Larestan County)
- Time zone: UTC+3:30 (IRST)

The Central District of Juyom County (Persian: بخش مرکزی شهرستان جویم) (Note: Formerly Juyom District (بخش جویم) of Larestan County) is in Fars province, Iran. Its capital is the city of Juyom.

== History ==
After the 2016 census, Juyom District (Note: Renamed the Central District of Juyom County) was separated from Larestan County (Note: Formerly Lar County) in the establishment of Juyom County and renamed the Central District. The new county was divided into two districts of two rural districts each, with Juyom as its capital and only city at the time.

== Demographics ==
=== Population ===
At the time of the 2006 census, the district's population (as Juyom District of Larestan County) was 19,601 in 4,068 households. The following census in 2011 counted 28,083 people in 6,662 households. The 2016 census measured the population of the district as 25,081 inhabitants in 6,977 households.

=== Administrative divisions ===
Central District (Juyom County) (Note: As Juyom District of Larestan County at the 2006, 2011, and 2016 censuses)
Administrative Divisions	2006	2011	2016
Chaghan RD			
Harm RD (Note: Transferred to Harm District after the 2016 census)	8,992	12,970	12,202
Juyom RD	4,213	6,303	4,869
Juyom (city)	6,396	8,810	8,010
Total	19,601	28,083	25,081
RD = Rural District
