= Babuyi Rural District =

Rural district in Kohgiluyeh and Boyer-Ahmad province, Iran

Babuyi Rural District Persian: دهستان بابوئي
- Rural District
- Location within Iran
- Coordinates: 30°17′51″N 51°08′50″E
- Country: Iran
- Province: Kohgiluyeh and Boyer-Ahmad
- County: Basht
- District: Bustan
- Capital: Bustan

Population (2016)
  - Total: 4,341
- Time zone: UTC+3:30 (IRST)

Babuyi Rural District (Persian: دهستان بابوئي) is in Bustan District of Basht County, Kohgiluyeh and Boyer-Ahmad province, Iran. It is administered from the city of Bustan. The rural district was previously administered from the city of Basht.

== Demographics ==
=== Population ===
At the time of the 2006 National Census, the rural district's population (as a part of the former Basht District of Gachsaran County) was 9,606 in 1,824 households. There were 4,233 inhabitants in 1,073 households at the following census of 2011, by which time the district had separated from the county in the establishment of Basht County. The rural district was transferred to the new Bustan District. The 2016 census measured the population of the rural district as 4,341 in 1,235 households. The most populous of its 39 villages was Bustan (now a city), with 1,248 people.
