= Kuh Mareh Khami Rural District =

Rural district in Kohgiluyeh and Boyer-Ahmad province, Iran

Kuh Mareh Khami Rural District Persian: دهستان كوه مره خامي
- Rural District
- Location within Iran
- Coordinates: 30°31′45″N 50°59′16″E
- Country: Iran
- Province: Kohgiluyeh and Boyer-Ahmad
- County: Basht
- District: Central
- Capital: Abdehgah

Population (2016)
  - Total: 2,428
- Time zone: UTC+3:30 (IRST)

Kuh Mareh Khami Rural District (Persian: دهستان كوه مره خامي) is in the Central District of Basht County, Kohgiluyeh and Boyer-Ahmad province, Iran. Its capital is the village of Abdehgah.

== Demographics ==
=== Population ===
At the time of the 2006 National Census, the rural district's population (as a part of the former Basht District of Gachsaran County) was 4,295 in 924 households. There were 2,326 inhabitants in 603 households at the following census of 2011, by which time the district had been separated from the county in the establishment of Basht County. The rural district was transferred to the new Central District. The 2016 census measured the population of the rural district as 2,428 in 626 households. The most populous of its 61 villages was Abdehgah, with 342 people.
