= Central District (Basht County) =

District in Kohgiluyeh and Boyer-Ahmad province, Iran

Central District (Basht County) Persian: بخش مرکزی شهرستان باشت
- District
- Location within Iran
- Coordinates: 30°30′18″N 51°00′28″E
- Country: Iran
- Province: Kohgiluyeh and Boyer-Ahmad
- County: Basht
- Capital: Basht

Population (2016)
  - Total: 15,667
- Time zone: UTC+3:30 (IRST)

The Central District of Basht County (Persian: بخش مرکزی شهرستان باشت) is in Kohgiluyeh and Boyer-Ahmad province, Iran. Its capital is the city of Basht.

== History ==
After the 2006 National Census, Basht District was separated from Gachsaran County in the establishment of Basht County, which was divided into two districts of two rural districts each, with Basht as its capital and only city at the time.

== Demographics ==
=== Population ===
At the time of the 2011 census, the district's population was 14,516 people in 3,499 households. The 2016 census measured the population of the district as 15,667 inhabitants in 4,092 households.

=== Administrative divisions ===
Central District (Basht County) Population
Administrative Divisions	2011	2016
Kuh Mareh Khami RD	2,326	2,428
Sarab Biz RD	2,924	2,475
Basht (city)	9,266	10,764
Total	14,516	15,667
RD = Rural District
