= Basht District =

Former district in Kohgiluyeh and Boyer-Ahmad province, Iran

Basht District Persian: بخش باشت
- Former District
- Location within Iran
- Coordinates: 30°27′N 51°03′E
- Country: Iran
- Province: Kohgiluyeh and Boyer-Ahmad
- County: Gachsaran
- Capital: Basht

Population (2006)
  - Total: 22,170
- Time zone: UTC+3:30 (IRST)

Basht District (Persian: بخش باشت) is a former administrative division of Gachsaran County, Kohgiluyeh and Boyer-Ahmad province, Iran. Its capital was the city of Basht.

== History ==
After the 2006 National Census, the district was separated from the county in the establishment of Basht County.

== Demographics ==
=== Population ===
At the time of the 2006 census, the district's population was 22,170 in 4,309 households.

=== Administrative divisions ===
Basht District Population
Administrative Divisions	2006
Babuyi RD	9,606
Kuh Mareh Khami RD	4,295
Basht (city)	8,269
Total	22,170
RD = Rural District
