= Basht County =

County in Kohgiluyeh and Boyer-Ahmad province, Iran

Basht County Persian: شهرستان باشت
- County
- Location of Basht County in Kohgiluyeh and Boyer-Ahmad province (right, green)

- Location of Kohgiluyeh and Boyer-Ahmad province in Iran
- Coordinates: 30°27′N 51°03′E
- Country: Iran
- Province: Kohgiluyeh and Boyer-Ahmad
- Capital: Basht
- Districts: Central, Bustan

Population (2016)
  - Total: 21,690
- Time zone: UTC+3:30 (IRST)

Basht County (Persian: شهرستان باشت) is in Kohgiluyeh and Boyer-Ahmad province, Iran. Its capital is the city of Basht.

== History ==
After the 2006 National Census, Basht District was separated from Gachsaran County in the establishment of Basht County, which was divided into two districts of two rural districts each, with Basht as its capital and only city at the time. After the 2016 census, the village of Bustan was elevated to the status of a city.

== Demographics ==
=== Population ===
At the time of the 2011 census, the county's population was 20,699 people in 5,022 households. The 2016 census measured the population of the county as 21,690 in 5,781 households.

=== Administrative divisions ===
Basht County's population history and administrative structure over two consecutive censuses are shown in the following table.

Basht County Population
Administrative Divisions	2011	2016
Central District	14,516	15,667
Kuh Mareh Khami RD	2,326	2,428
Sarab Biz RD	2,924	2,475
Basht (city)	9,266	10,764
Bustan District	6,059	5,941
Babuyi RD	4,233	4,341
Talkhab RD	1,826	1,600
Bustan (city) (Note: Became a city after the 2016 census)		
Total	20,699	21,690
RD = Rural District

== See also ==
Media related to Basht County at Wikimedia Commons
