= Gazdan =

Gazdan or Gezdan (Persian: گزدان) may refer to:

- Gazdan, Fars
- Gazdan-e Abbas Abdollah, Fars Province
- Gazdan, Bandar Lengeh, Hormozgan Province
- Gazdan, Jask, Hormozgan Province
- Gazdan, Bam, Kerman Province
- Gazdan, Shahr-e Babak, Kerman Province
- Gazdan, Kohgiluyeh and Boyer-Ahmad
- Gazdan, Sistan and Baluchestan
