= Aghoseh =

Village in Fars province, Iran

Aghoseh Persian: اغصه
- Village
- Location within Iran
- Coordinates: 27°40′12″N 53°42′12″E
- Country: Iran
- Province: Fars
- County: Gerash
- District: Arad
- Rural District: Sabz Push

Population (2016)
  - Total: 648
- Time zone: UTC+3:30 (IRST)

Aghoseh (Persian: اغصه) (Note: Also romanized as Agheşeh and Āghoşeh; also known as Aghoşbeh and A‘ẕeh) is a village in Sabz Push Rural District of Arad District, Gerash County, Fars province, Iran.

== Demographics ==
=== Population ===
At the time of the 2006 National Census, the village's population was 271 in 54 households, when it was in Arad Rural District of the former Gerash District of Larestan County. (Note: Formerly Lar County) The following census in 2011 counted 593 people in 149 households, by which time the district had been separated from the county in the establishment of Gerash County. The rural district was transferred to the new Central District, and six months later was transferred to the new Arad District. Aghoseh was transferred to Sabz Push Rural District created in the district. The 2016 census measured the population of the village as 648 people in 179 households. It was the most populous village in its rural district.
