= Arad =

Arad or ARAD may refer to:

== People ==
- Arad (given name)
- Arad (surname)

== Places and jurisdictions ==
=== Bahrain ===
- Arad, Bahrain, a village in Al Muharraq Governorate
- Arad Fort, located on Arad shore
- Arad Island, a former member of the Bahrain Islands, now joined Muharraq

=== Iran ===
- Arad, Iran, a city in Fars Province, Iran
  - Arad District, an administrative subdivision of Fars Province
  - Arad Rural District, an administrative subdivision of Fars Province
- Arad General Hospital in Tehran, Iran
- Arad, Tehran, a village in Tehran Province, Iran

=== Israel ===
- Arad, Israel, a city in Israel
- Tel Arad, the remains of the ancient city of Arad
  - Arad (see), an ancient bishopric in the ancient city of Arad, now a Latin Catholic titular see
- Tel Arad, Israel, unrecognised Bedouin village near the ancient site

=== Romania ===
- Arad, Romania, the main city of Arad County
- Arad County, at the western edge of Transylvania (Crişana-Banat), Romania
- Arad County (former), a historical county, first Kingdom of Hungary, Austro-Hungarian Empire, later in Romania
- Arad Region, an administrative division of the People's Republic of Romania 1950–1956
- Archdiocese of Arad, an episcopal see of the Romanian Orthodox Church

== Other uses ==
- ARAD (Sumerogram), a letter in Sumerian cuneiform
- CFR Arad, a Romanian football club 1921–1985
- F.C. Arad, an Israeli football club
- IWI ARAD, an Israeli assault rifle
- abbreviation of attoradian (arad), a unit of angle
