= Khalili, Fars =

Village in Fars province, Iran

Khalili Persian: خلیلی
- Village
- Location within Iran
- Coordinates: 27°38′15″N 53°18′03″E
- Country: Iran
- Province: Fars
- County: Gerash
- District: Central
- Rural District: Khalili

Population (2016)
  - Total: 1,582
- Time zone: UTC+3:30 (IRST)

Khalili (Persian: خلیلی) (Note: Also romanized as Khalīlī) is a village in, and the capital of, Khalili Rural District of the Central District of Gerash County, Fars province, Iran.

== Demographics ==
=== Population ===
At the time of the 2006 National Census, the village's population was 1,438 in 264 households, when it was in Fedagh Rural District of the former Gerash District of Larestan County. (Note: Formerly Lar County) The following census in 2011 counted 1,932 people in 541 households, by which time the district had been separated from the county in the establishment of Gerash County. The rural district was transferred to the new Central District, and Khalili was transferred to Khalili Rural District created in the district. The 2016 census measured the population of the village as 1,582 people in 461 households. It was the most populous village in its rural district.
