= Zeynalabad, Fars =

Village in Fars province, Iran

Zeynalabad Persian: زينل اباد
- Village
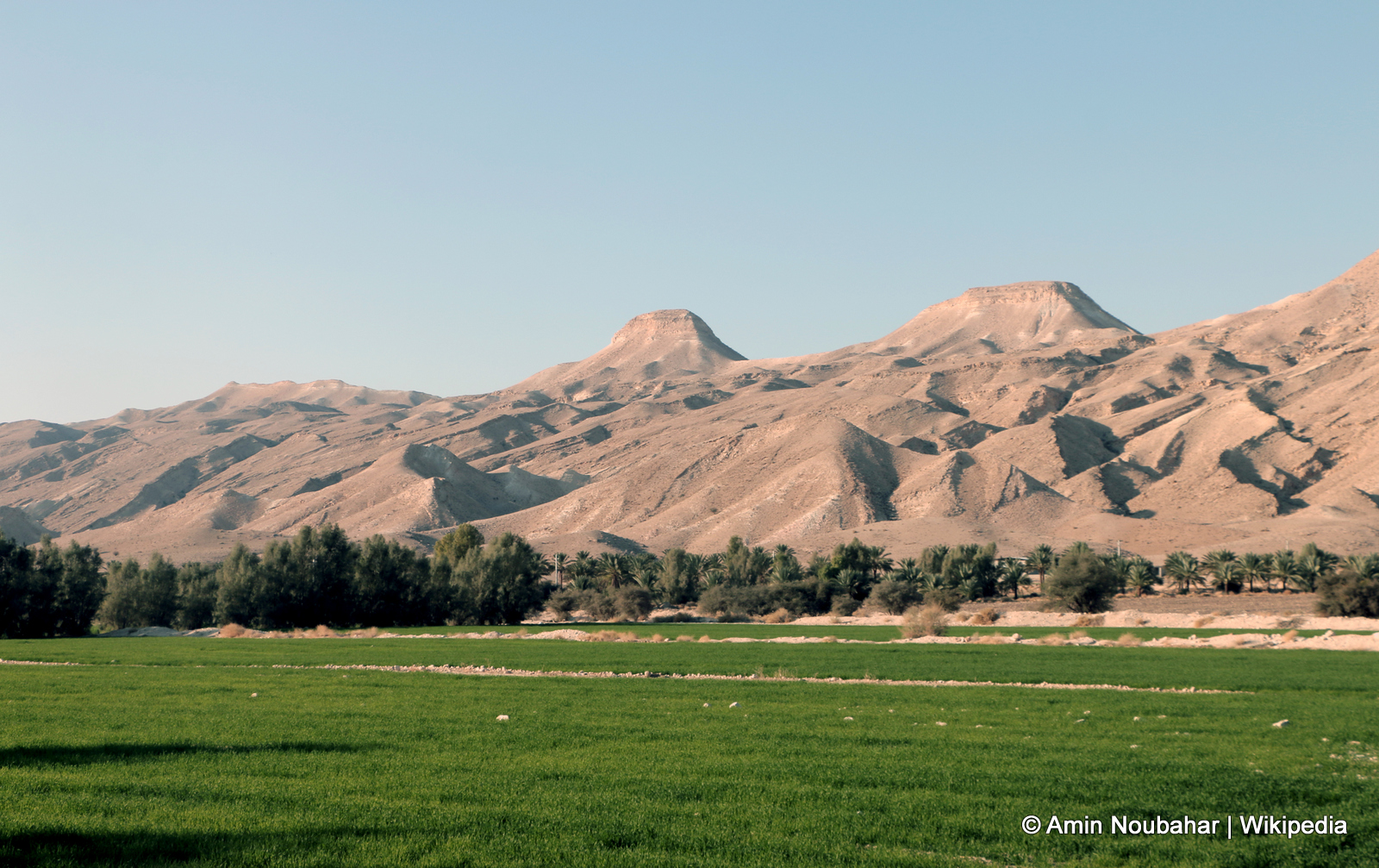
- Zeynalabad

- Location within Iran
- Coordinates: 27°41′35″N 53°48′02″E
- Country: Iran
- Province: Fars
- County: Gerash
- District: Arad
- Rural District: Sabz Push

Population (2016)
  - Total: 632
- Time zone: UTC+3:30 (IRST)

Zeynalabad (Persian: زينل اباد) (Note: Also romanized as Zeynalābād) is a village in, and the capital of, Sabz Push Rural District of Arad District, Gerash County, Fars province, Iran.

== Demographics ==
=== Population ===
At the time of the 2006 National Census, the village's population was 529 in 95 households, when it was in Arad Rural District of the former Gerash District of Larestan County. (Note: Formerly Lar County) The following census in 2011 counted 650 people in 142 households, by which time the district had been separated from the county in the establishment of Gerash County. The rural district was transferred to the new Central District, and six months later was transferred to the new Arad District. Zeynalabad was transferred to Sabz Push Rural District created in the district. The 2016 census measured the population of the village as 632 people in 160 households.
