= Bashirabad, Fars =

Bashirabad بشیرآباد
- Village
- Location within Iran
- Coordinates: 27°36′26″N 53°25′28″E
- Country: Iran
- Province: Fars
- County: Gerash
- Bakhsh: Central
- Rural District: Khalili

Population (2016)
  - Total: 159
- Time zone: UTC+3:30 (IRST)
  - Summer (DST): UTC+4:30 (IRDT)

Bashirabad (Persian: بشیرآباد, also Romanized as Bashīrābād) is a village in Khalili Rural District, in the Central District of Gerash County, Fars province, Iran. At the 2016 census, its population was 159, in 41 families.
