= Nakhlestan Tang-e Khour =

Nakhlestan Tang-e Khour نخلستان تنگ خور
- Village
- Location within Iran
- Coordinates: 27°39′56″N 53°21′20″E
- Country: Iran
- Province: Fars
- County: Gerash
- Bakhsh: Central
- Rural District: Khalili

Population (2016)
  - Total: 116
- Time zone: UTC+3:30 (IRST)
  - Summer (DST): UTC+4:30 (IRDT)

Nakhlestan Tang-e Khour (Persian: نخلستان تنگ خور) is a village in Khalili Rural District, in the Central District of Gerash County, Fars province, Iran. As of the 2016 census, its population was 116, with 32 families.
