= Jashahr =

Jashahr جاشهر
- Village
- Country: Iran
- Province: Fars
- County: Gerash
- Bakhsh: Arad
- Rural District: Arad

Population (2006)
  - Total: 19
- Time zone: UTC+3:30 (IRST)
  - Summer (DST): UTC+4:30 (IRDT)

Jashahr (Persian: جاشهر, also Romanized as Jāshahr) is a village in Arad Rural District, Arad District, Gerash County, Fars province, Iran. At the 2006 census, its population was 19, in 6 families.
