= Hosseinabad, Gerash =

Hosseinabad حسین‌آباد
- Village
- Location within Iran
- Coordinates: 27°37′12″N 53°22′15″E
- Country: Iran
- Province: Fars
- County: Gerash
- Bakhsh: Central
- Rural District: Khalili

Population (2016)
  - Total: 501
- Time zone: UTC+3:30 (IRST)
  - Summer (DST): UTC+4:30 (IRDT)

Hosseinabad (Persian: حسین‌آباد, also Romanized as Ḩosseinābād) is a village in Khalili Rural District, in the Central District of Gerash County, Fars province, Iran. At the 2016 census, its population was 501, in 131 families.
