= Nakhlestan-e Balangestan =

Nakhlestan-e Balangestan نخلستان بالنگستان
- Village
- Country: Iran
- Province: Fars
- County: Gerash
- Bakhsh: Central
- Rural District: Fedagh

Population (2016)
  - Total: 68
- Time zone: UTC+3:30 (IRST)
  - Summer (DST): UTC+4:30 (IRDT)

Nakhlestan-e Balangestan (Persian: نخلستان بالنگستان, also Romanized as Nakhlestan Balangestan) is a village in Fedagh Rural District, Central District, Gerash County, Fars province, Iran. At the 2016 census, its population was 68, in 11 families.
