= Heydarabad, Gerash =

Heydarabad حیدرآباد
- Village
- Location within Iran
- Coordinates: 27°37′46″N 53°22′23″E
- Country: Iran
- Province: Fars
- County: Gerash
- Bakhsh: Central
- Rural District: Khalili

Population (2016)
  - Total: 19
- Time zone: UTC+3:30 (IRST)
  - Summer (DST): UTC+4:30 (IRDT)

Heydarabad (Persian: حیدرآباد, also Romanized as Ḩeydarābād) is a village in Khalili Rural District, in the Central District of Gerash County, Fars province, Iran. At the 2016 census, its population was 19, in 4 families.
