= Miluyeh =

Miluyeh میلویه
- Village
- Location within Iran
- Coordinates: 27°41′59″N 53°40′18″E
- Country: Iran
- Province: Fars
- County: Gerash
- Bakhsh: Arad
- Rural District: Arad

Population (2016)
  - Total: 97
- Time zone: UTC+3:30 (IRST)
  - Summer (DST): UTC+4:30 (IRDT)

Miluyeh (Persian: میلویه, also Romanized as Mīlūyeh) is a village in Arad Rural District, Arad District, Gerash County, Fars province, Iran. At the 2016 census, its population was 97, in 31 families.
