= Lab Eshkan =

Lab Eshkan لب‌اشکن
- Village
- Location within Iran
- Coordinates: 27°35′33″N 53°29′24″E
- Country: Iran
- Province: Fars
- County: Gerash
- Bakhsh: Central
- Rural District: Khalili

Population (2016)
  - Total: 1,208
- Time zone: UTC+3:30 (IRST)
  - Summer (DST): UTC+4:30 (IRDT)

Lab Eshkan (Persian: لب‌اشکن, also Romanized as Labeshkan) is a village in Khalili Rural District, in the Central District of Gerash County, Fars province, Iran. At the 2016 census, its population was 1208, in 229 families.
