= Kasroddasht =

Kasroddasht کسرالدشت
- Village
- Country: Iran
- Province: Fars
- County: Gerash
- Bakhsh: Central
- Rural District: Fedagh

Population (2016)
  - Total: 71
- Time zone: UTC+3:30 (IRST)
  - Summer (DST): UTC+4:30 (IRDT)

Kasroddasht (Persian: کسرالدشت) is a village in Fedagh Rural District, Central District, Gerash County, Fars province, Iran. At the 2016 census, its population was 71, in 21 families.
