= Fedagh =

Village in Fars province, Iran

Fedagh Persian: فداغ
- Village
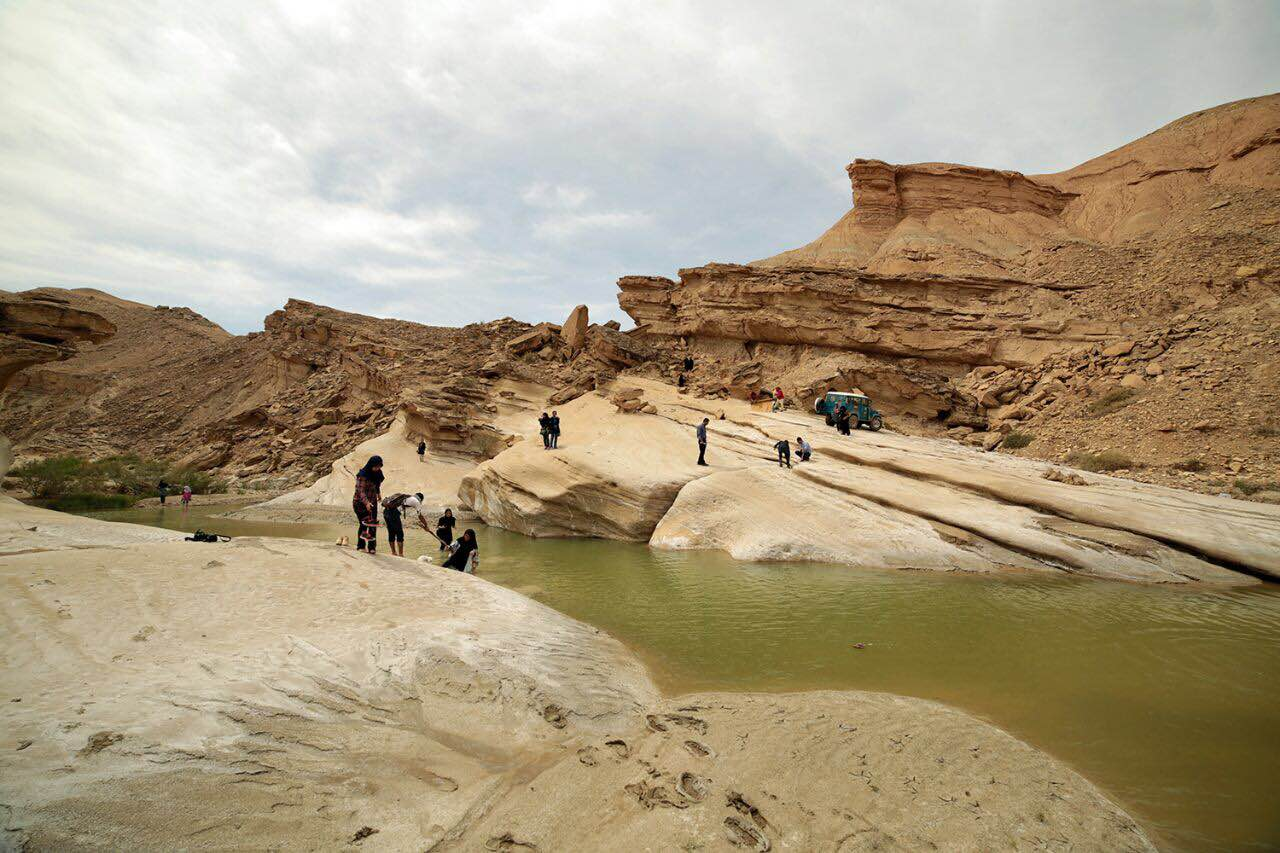

- Location within Iran
- Coordinates: 27°35′14″N 53°34′01″E
- Country: Iran
- Province: Fars
- County: Gerash
- District: Central
- Rural District: Fedagh

Population (2016)
  - Total: 6,533
- Time zone: UTC+3:30 (IRST)

Fedagh (Persian: فداغ) (Note: Also romanized as Fadagh and Fadāgh; also known as Fidāgh and Fīdaq) is a village in, and the capital of, Fedagh Rural District of the Central District of Gerash County, Fars province, Iran.

== Demographics ==
=== Ethnicity ===
The people of Fedagh are Ashomi, of Aryan Persian ethnic origins and of Zoroastrian religious background, who converted to Islam (Shia) around the 11th century A.D. and after invasion of Iran by the Arabs.Fedaghi people speak Ashomi of lari language with Fedaghi dialect. Fedagh is the most advanced village in southwest Iran for education and tech. Its students have achieved the highest grades in mathematics and physics in Iran, with more than 50 students who are first 1,000 in Iran universities.

=== Population ===
At the time of the 2006 National Census, the village's population was 2,346 in 510 households, when it was in the former Gerash District of Larestan County. (Note: Formerly Lar County) The following census in 2011 counted 4,550 people in 1,205 households. The 2016 census measured the population of the village as 6,533 people in 1,518 households, by which time the district had been separated from the county in the establishment of Gerash County. The rural district was transferred to the new Central District. Fedagh was the most populous village in its rural district.

== Geography ==
=== Location ===
Fedagh is in the south of Fars province and west of Gerash county. It is located between Arad, Beyram, Evaz and Emad Deh. Fedagh is situated 785 meters above the sea level. Fedagh has two Dams, one old from over 1500 years ago and a new one in east of Fedagh with fishing and amusement facilities.

=== Balangestan ===
Balangestan is an agricultural area with dates and lime trees and moderate weather 5 km north of Fedagh in the South Zagros mountains.

=== Climate ===
The climate is hot and dry in summer and cold in winter. Spring and autumn are moderate and pleasant.
