= Posht Pari =

Posht Pari پشت پری
- Village
- Location within Iran
- Coordinates: 27°38′31″N 53°12′59″E
- Country: Iran
- Province: Fars
- County: Gerash
- Bakhsh: Central
- Rural District: Khalili

Population (2016)
  - Total: 120
- Time zone: UTC+3:30 (IRST)
  - Summer (DST): UTC+4:30 (IRDT)

Posht Pari (Persian: پشت پری, also Romanized as Posht Parī; also known as Posht Barī) is a village in Khalili Rural District, in the Central District of Gerash County, Fars province, Iran. At the 2016 census, its population was 120, in 35 families.
