= Sabz Push Rural District =

Rural district in Fars province, Iran

Sabz Push Rural District Persian: دهستان سبزپوش
- Rural District
- Location within Iran
- Coordinates: 27°41′33″N 53°51′09″E
- Country: Iran
- Province: Fars
- County: Gerash
- District: Arad
- Capital: Zeynalabad

Population (2016)
  - Total: 1,586
- Time zone: UTC+3:30 (IRST)

Sabz Push Rural District (Persian: دهستان سبزپوش) is in Arad District of Gerash County, Fars province, Iran. Its capital is the village of Zeynalabad.

== History ==
In November 2008, Beyram, Evaz, and Gerash Districts were separated from Larestan County (Note: Formerly Lar County) in the establishment of Gerash County. However, Beyram and Evaz Districts were returned to Larestan County six months later. At the same time, Arad Rural District was separated from the Central District in the formation of Arad District, and Sabz Push Rural District was created in the new district.

== Demographics ==
=== Population ===
At the time of the 2011 National Census, the rural district's population was 1,369 in 322 households. The 2016 census measured the population of the rural district as 1,586 in 409 households. The most populous of its eight villages was Aghoseh, with 648 people.
