= Kang o Risheh =

Kang o Risheh کنگ و ریشه
- Village
- Location within Iran
- Coordinates: 27°34′16″N 53°39′39″E
- Country: Iran
- Province: Fars
- County: Gerash
- Bakhsh: Central
- Rural District: Fedagh

Population (2016)
  - Total: 438
- Time zone: UTC+3:30 (IRST)
  - Summer (DST): UTC+4:30 (IRDT)

Kang o Risheh (Persian: کنگ و ریشه, also Romanized as Kang o Rīsheh) is a village in Fedagh Rural District, in the Central District of Gerash County, Fars province, Iran. At the 2016 census, its population was 438, in 91 families.
