= Faryabi =

Faryabi فاریابی
- Village
- Country: Iran
- Province: Fars
- County: Gerash
- Bakhsh: Central
- Rural District: Fedagh

Population (2016)
  - Total: 183
- Time zone: UTC+3:30 (IRST)
  - Summer (DST): UTC+4:30 (IRDT)

Faryabi (Persian: فاریابی) is a village in Fedagh Rural District, Central District, Gerash County, Fars province, Iran. At the 2016 census, its population was 183, in 28 families.
