= Konar-e Ziarat =

Konar-e Ziarat كُنار زيارت
- Village
- Location within Iran
- Coordinates: 27°40′23″N 54°02′54″E
- Country: Iran
- Province: Fars
- County: Gerash
- Bakhsh: Central
- Rural District: Fedagh

Population (2016)
  - Total: 224
- Time zone: UTC+3:30 (IRST)
  - Summer (DST): UTC+4:30 (IRDT)

Konar-e Ziarat (Persian: كُنار زيارت, also Romanized as Konār-e Zīārat) is a village in Fedagh Rural District, Central District, Gerash County, Fars province, Iran. At the 2016 census, its population was 224, in 62 families.
