= Mohammad Zeyna =

Mohammad Zeyna محمدزينا
- Village
- Location within Iran
- Coordinates: 27°33′16″N 53°30′59″E
- Country: Iran
- Province: Fars
- County: Gerash
- Bakhsh: Central
- Rural District: Fedagh

Population (2016)
  - Total: 1,066
- Time zone: UTC+3:30 (IRST)

Mohammad Zeyna (Persian: محمدزينا, also Romanized as Moḩammad Zeynā) is a village in Fedagh Rural District, Central District, Gerash County, Fars province, Iran. At the 2016 census, its population was 1066, in 232 families.
