= Chak Chak, Fars =

Chak Chak چك چك
- Village
- Country: Iran
- Province: Fars
- County: Gerash
- Bakhsh: Arad
- Rural District: Arad

Population (2006)
  - Total: 156
- Time zone: UTC+3:30 (IRST)
  - Summer (DST): UTC+4:30 (IRDT)

Chak Chak (Persian: چك چك) is a village in Arad Rural District, Arad District, Gerash County, Fars province, Iran. At the 2006 census, its population was 156, in 29 families.
