= Zeynalabad =

Zeynalabad or Zainulabad or Zeyn ol Abad (Persian: زينل اباد) may refer to:

- Zeynalabad, Fars
- Zeynalabad, Kerman
- Zeynalabad-e Damdari Salman, Kerman Province
- Zeynalabad, Sistan and Baluchestan
- Zeynalabad, Sarbisheh, South Khorasan Province
