= Gazdan, Fars =

Gazdan گزدان
- Village
- Location within Iran
- Coordinates: 27°42′31″N 53°45′46″E
- Country: Iran
- Province: Fars
- County: Gerash
- Bakhsh: Arad
- Rural District: Arad

Population (2006)
  - Total: 30
- Time zone: UTC+3:30 (IRST)
  - Summer (DST): UTC+4:30 (IRDT)

Gazdan (Persian: گزدان, also Romanized as Gazdān; also known as Gezdu) is a village in Arad Rural District, Arad District, Gerash County, Fars province, Iran. At the 2006 census, its population was 30, in 6 families.
