= Gerashi yogurt kebab =

Iranian kebab dish

Gerashi Kebab
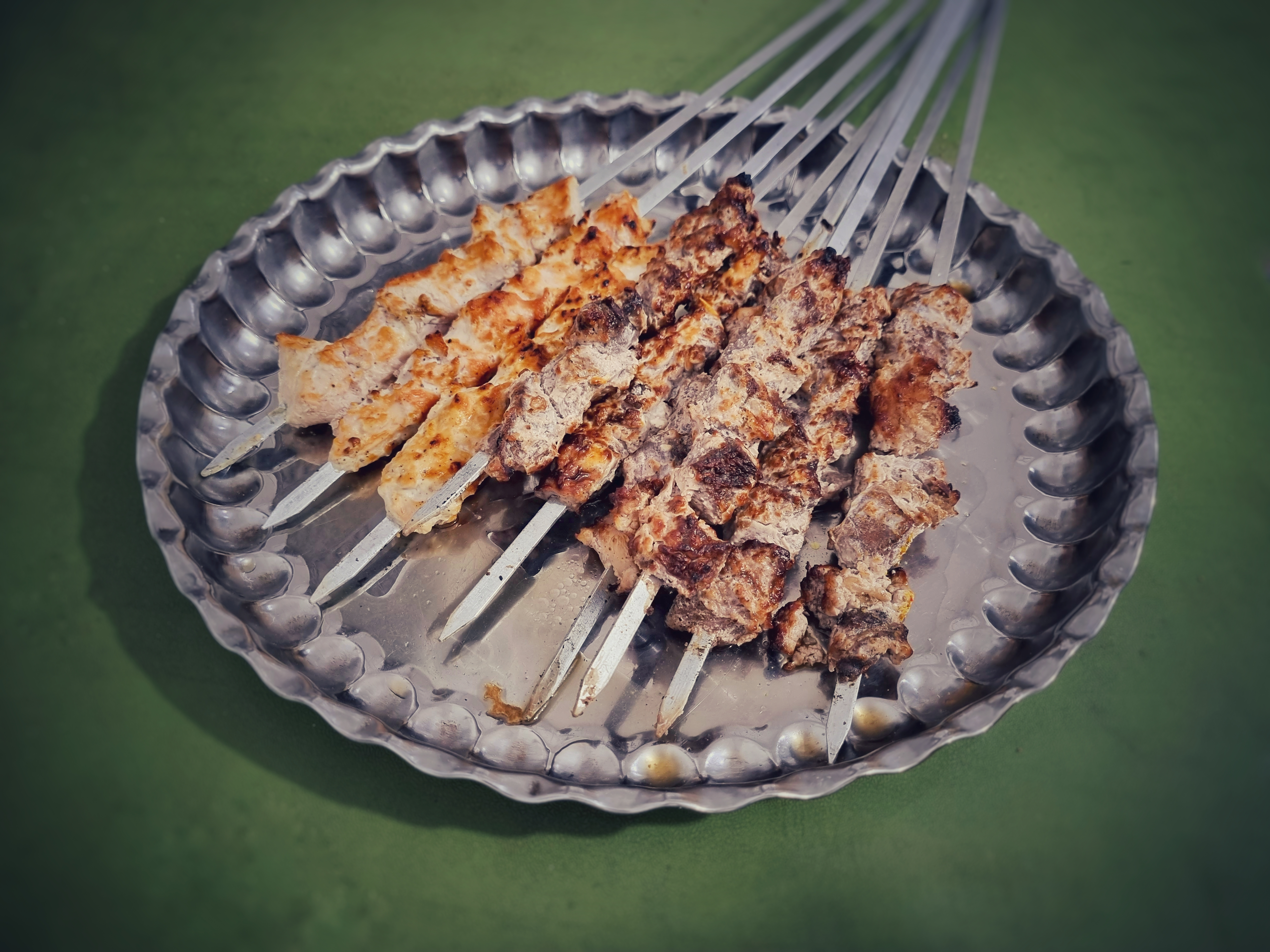
- Alternative names: Gerashi Kebab, Kenjeh Kebab
- Type: Kebab
- Course: Main dish
- Region or state: Fars province, Hormozgan province
- Associated cuisine: Iranian
- Created by: Achomi people
- Main ingredients: Cubed meat; Strained yogurt
- Ingredients generally used: Chopped onion; Salt; Black pepper

Gerashi yogurt kebab (Persian: کباب گراشی), also known as Lari kebab, yogurt kenjeh kebab or Gerashi special kebab, is an Achomi kebab associated with the cities of Gerash and Lar in southern Fars province, and parts of Hormozgan province in southern Iran. It is typically made from cubed loin meat, including goat, lamb, camel, or veal, which is marinated with strained yogurt, chopped onion, salt, and black pepper.

== Preparation ==
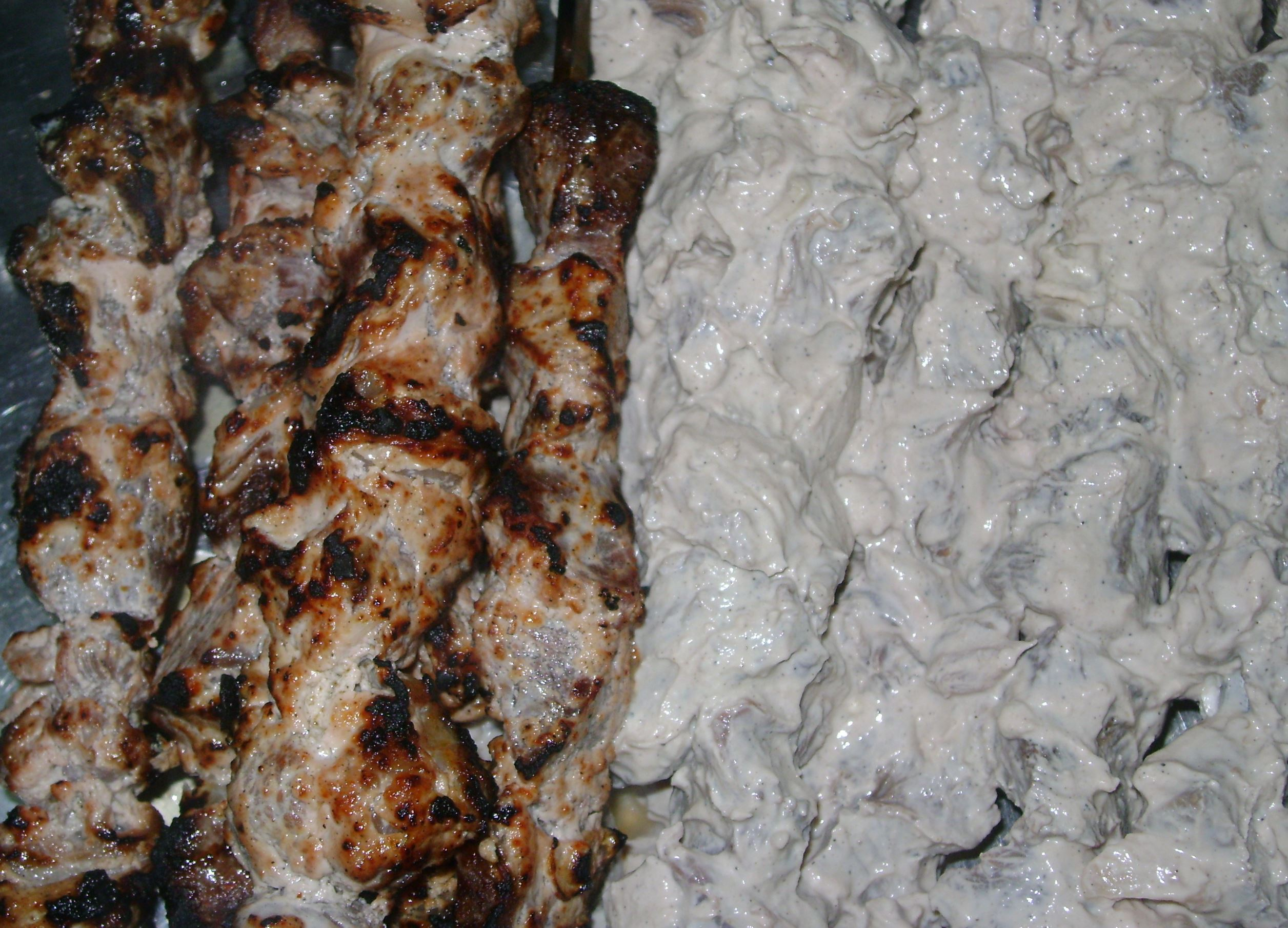
Yogurt kebab, cooked on the left and uncooked on the right.

To prepare the kebab, the meat is first cut into small cubes. Traditionally, each piece is approximately four times the size of a sugar cube.

The pieces of meat are then spread on a cotton cloth for a period of time so that excess surface moisture can drain away. This step is traditionally regarded as helping the meat absorb the yogurt marinade more effectively.

Strained yogurt is mixed with chopped onion, salt, and black pepper. The meat is then added to the mixture and thoroughly combined by hand until the pieces are evenly coated.

The marinated meat is left to rest under refrigeration. The required marinating time may vary according to local practice and the season, although a period of at least 24 hours is commonly used.

After marinating, the pieces are placed on skewers and are traditionally grilled over charcoal.

== Role in Gerashi culture ==
=== Folklore and oral tradition ===
The precise period in which this method of preparing meat became established in the culinary culture of Gerash is not known. However, a number of local stories and traditional customs refer to the dish, suggesting that it has been part of the region's food culture for a considerable period of time.

One example is the local tale known as "Tofeyli and Mofeyli" (Persian: طُفیلی و مُفیلی), which concerns a feast held by a local khan. Gerashi kebab is prepared for the guests, and the events of the story develop around the feast.

=== Wedding traditions ===
Gerashi yogurt kebab has historically been associated with traditional wedding celebrations in Gerash and has been served as the principal meal on at least one night of the wedding festivities.

The preparation of the kebab was itself connected with a number of local wedding customs. In one such tradition, Eshkali (Persian: اِشکالی; eškāli), hunters went into the countryside to hunt gazelles to obtain meat for the wedding kebab.

The older hunting custom is no longer generally practised in its original form. A related ceremony, known locally as "Gesht para kerda" (Persian: گِشت پَرَ کِردَه; gešt para kerda), involves members of the groom's family obtaining and preparing the meat required for the wedding celebration according to local customs.

== Customs and beliefs ==
Gerashi kebab is traditionally associated with celebrations and festive gatherings, as the dish is generally not prepared for mourning ceremonies.

== Restaurants and commercial preparation ==
Gerashi yogurt kebab is served in restaurants and kebab houses in parts of southern Iran. Some establishments specialize in varieties of southern Iranian kebab and are locally described using names such as special kebab, Gerashi kebab, or kebab-e khas ("special kebab").

Restaurants serving this style of kebab have also been established by communities from southern Iran in cities elsewhere in the Persian Gulf region, including Dubai, Doha, and Muscat. Some such establishments have reportedly operated for more than 40 years.

== See also ==
- Kebab
- List of kebabs
- Iranian cuisine
- Achomi people
