= Chak-chak (disambiguation) =

Chak-chak is a sweet dessert made of honey and pastry.

Chak-chak may also refer to:

- Chak Chak, Fars, a village in Iran
- Chak Chak, Yazd, a village in Iran
- Shak-shak, or chak-chak, an Antillean musical instrument
