= Ahmad Ansari =

Iranian merchant (c. 1938–2016)

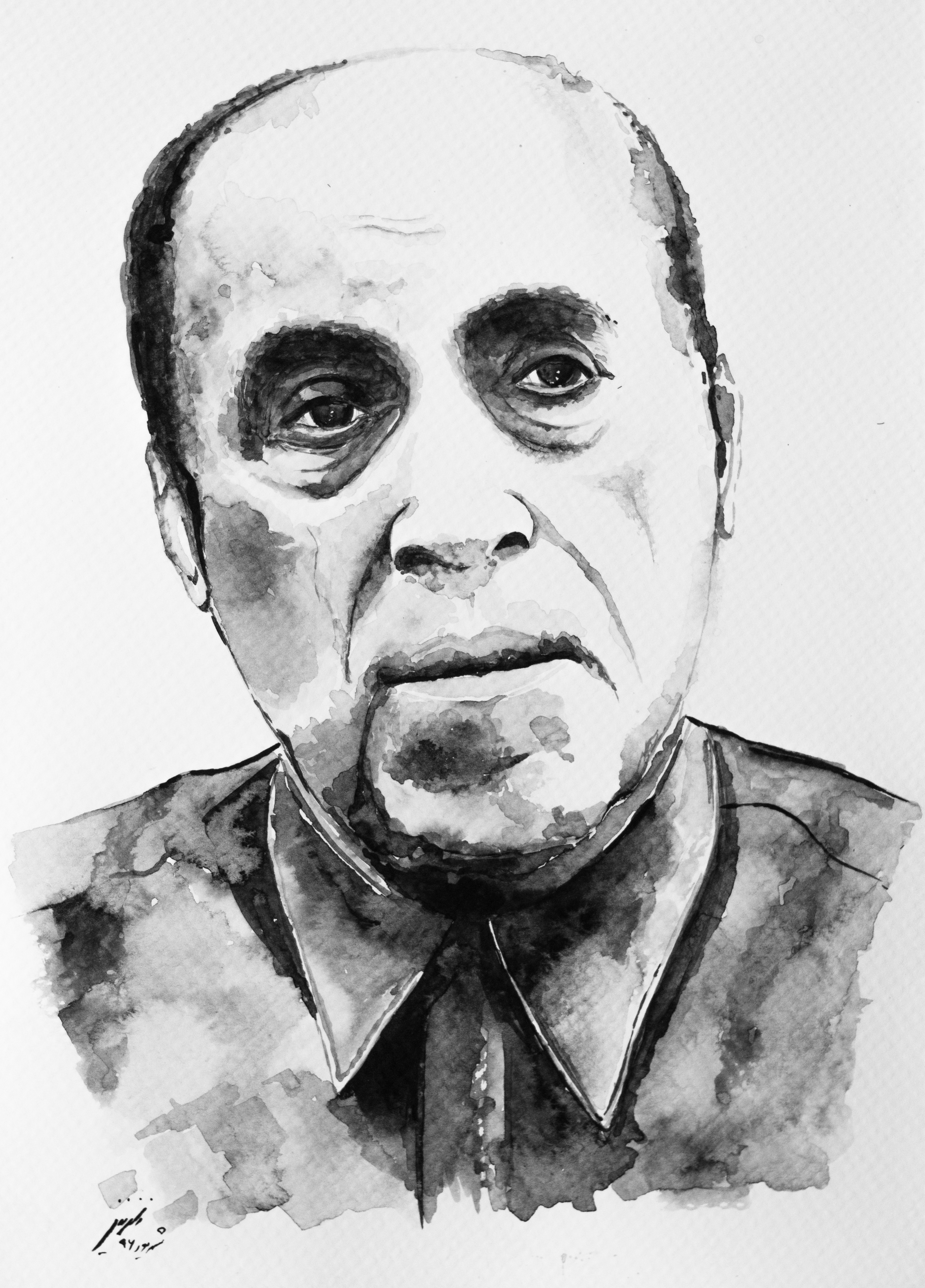
- Watercolor portrait of Ahmad Ansari by Nazanin Ghezeli
- Born: c. 1938; Gerash, Fars, Iran
- Died: 11 September 2016 (aged 77–78); Shiraz, Fars, Iran
- Burial place: Doha, Qatar
- Other names: Sheikh Ahmad

Ahmad Ansari Gerashi (Persian: احمد انصاری گراشی) known as Sheikh Ahmad (Persian: شیخ‌احمد), was an Iranian merchant, benefactor and international investor. He was born in Gerash, Fars, Iran in 1938 or 1939 and died on 11 September 2016 in Namazi Hospital, Shiraz. He is buried in Doha, Qatar.
