= Lordan =

Lordan may refer to:

== Geography ==
- Lordan, Iran, a village in Hormozgan Province, Iran

== People ==
Given name

- Lordan Zafranović (b. 1944), Yugoslav film director

Surname

- Bill Lordan (b. 1947), American musician
- Elaine Lordan (b. 1966), British actress
- Cillian Lordan (b. 1982), Irish footballer
- Jerry Lordan (1934-1995), English composer and singer
- John Lordan, American long-distance runner
