= Arad, Iran =

City in Fars province, Iran

Arad Persian: ارد
- City
- Location within Iran
- Coordinates: 27°43′44″N 53°37′28″E
- Country: Iran
- Province: Fars
- County: Gerash
- District: Arad

Population (2016)
  - Total: 5,094
- Time zone: UTC+3:30 (IRST)

Arad (Persian: ارد) (Note: Also romanized as Ard, Erad, Īrad, and Ird) is a city in, and the capital of, Arad District of Gerash County, Fars province, Iran. It also serves as the administrative center for Arad Rural District.

The outskirts of the city include many farming areas and dry open land. Arad is enclosed by two large mountains running parallel to the city. This makes travel to the city difficult. There is one two sided paved road running from a two-way split further down the road. This highway runs both east and west to large cities such as Jahrom, Qom, Firouzabad, Shiraz, Lar, Evaz, Gerash, and continues all the way South to the port city of Bandar Abbas.

== Demographics ==
=== Ethnicity and religion ===
- Islamic Shia : 97%
- Islamic Sunni : 1%
- Turks: 1%
- Afghan and other: 1%

=== Population ===
At the time of the 2006 National Census, Arad's population was 5,264 in 1,181 households, when it was a village in Arad Rural District of the former Gerash District of Larestan County. (Note: Formerly Lar County) The following census in 2011 counted 5,574 people in 1,623 households, by which time the district had been separated from the county in the establishment of Gerash County. The rural district was transferred to the new Central District, and six months later was transferred to the new Arad District. The 2016 census measured the population of the village as 5,094 people in 1,502 households.

After the census, Arad was elevated to the status of a city.

== Economy and infrastructure ==
Arad has a few markets where citizens may purchase fruits, vegetables, food, meats, bread, and other household items. The city also sports a lone gas station just outside the city. Many of the working population either work in a larger city/province, work in the farms, shops, or transport goods for a living. Most of the housing in the city is pre-modern clay and sand hardened structures. Newer buildings are made from bright white marble tile. The town is governed by a single Police/Military station/office.

Arad has three major mosques located around the city, one of which was built just recently and is openly televised on the main Fars news network. The city also includes four smaller mosques dispersed around the town.
