= Berkeh Haj Asadollah =

- برکه حاج اسدالله (Persian)
- Berkeh Kashkool
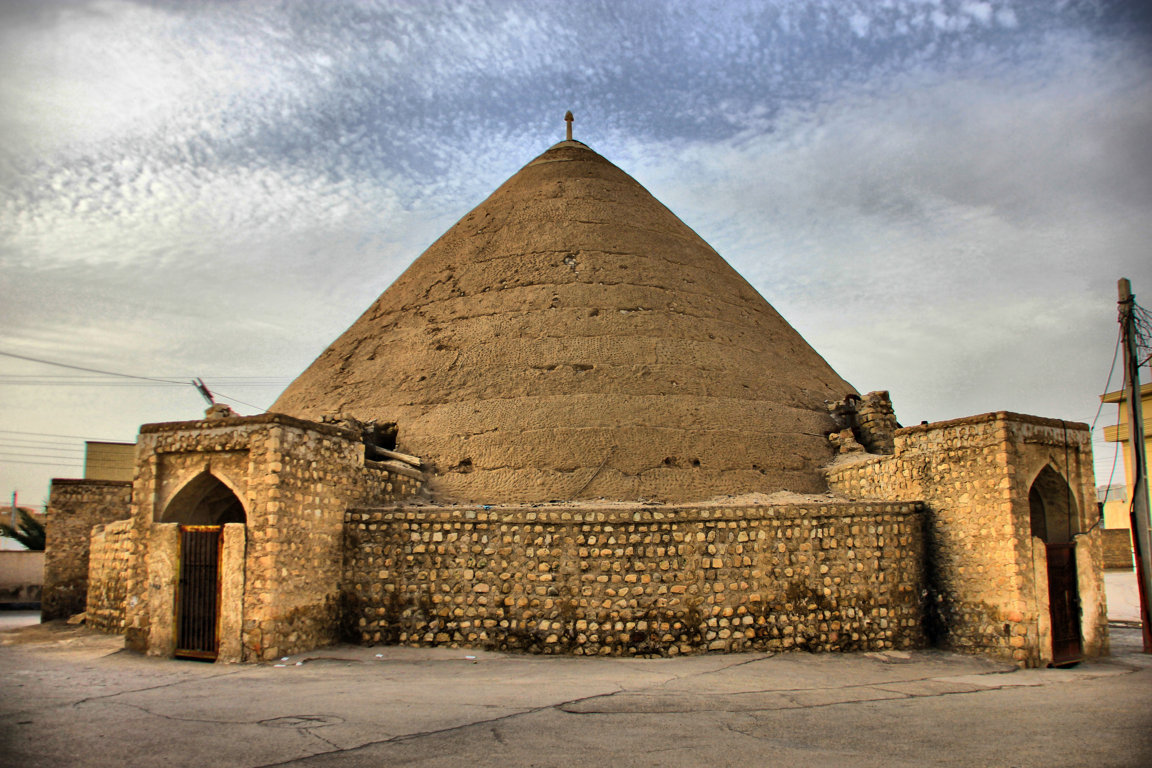
- The north view of berkeh before the damage to the dome (photo by Hassan Hosseini)

- Location within Iran
- 27°39′50″N 54°08′02″E
- Periods: Qajar dynasty
- Cultures: Achomi
- Location: Gerash, Fars province
- Region: Iran
- Part of: Haj Asadollah’s public endowments

History
- Built: 1286 A.H. (1869 A.D.)

Site notes
- Architectural style: Persian
- Management: Cultural Heritage, Handicrafts and Tourism Organization of Iran

Berkeh Haj Asadollah or Berkeh Kashkool (lit. Haj Asadollah water reservoir, Persian: برکه حاج اسدالله), located in Gerash, Fars province, Iran, was built in 1286 A.H. (1869 A.D.), by Haj Asadollah, son of Dahbashi Karbalayi AliReza Gerashi, and is the largest Berkeh (water reservoir built manually) after “Berkeh Kal” in Gerash.

== Building specifications ==
This reservoir has six entries and two water entry channels and two outlet channels. The man body of the reservoir, the dome and the channels are made of stone and “Sarooj”, a traditional water-resistant mortar used in Iranian architecture; and the main body walls (in local language, Shavera), entry arches, and the facades are made of plaster, and in plaster modeling is used in some facades. The roof of the reservoir is gigantic and dome-like and it is covered with stone and plaster and coated with Sarooj. Its step-like stones (in local language, Pakona) are located in the eastern side, down to the bottom of the reservoir. An inscription stone is installed at the top of one of the entries, on which a poem written by the founder is inscribed. This monument has been registered as one of the national monuments of Iran by the Ministry of Cultural Heritage, Handicrafts and Tourism of Iran in 1380 S.H. (2002 A.D.).

== Ownership ==
Considering the fact that all the monuments built by Haj Asadollah in Qajar era are public endowments, this building is in possession of the Endowments and Charity Affairs Organization of Iran since the Iranian revolution in 1979. Other monuments in Haj Asadollah's collection are "Berkeh Kal", "Chahardah Masoum Religious School" and "Dahbashi Bathhouse".

== Damage to the dome ==
During the rainfall in the beginning of January 2022, a part of the dome collapsed, confirming the warnings from cultural heritage NGOs about the unstable condition of the dome. Prior to this incident, the Endowments and Charity Affairs Organization and Hossein Hosseinzadeh, Member of Parliament, had claimed to be following up the situation of this building. It seems that this dome is going to collapse anyway, considering the kind of material used in its construction.

== See also ==
- Gerash
- Iran National Heritage List
