= Arad (given name) =

Arad is a masculine given name. People with the name include:

- Arad Simon Lakin (1810–1890), American minister, and university president
- Arad McCutchan (1912–1993), American college basketball coach
- Arad Sawat (born 1975), Israeli film and television set and production designer
- Arad Thomas (1807–1889), American lawyer

== See also ==
- Arad (surname), list of people with the surname
