= Balangestan =

Coordinates: 27°39′07″N 053°35′31″E

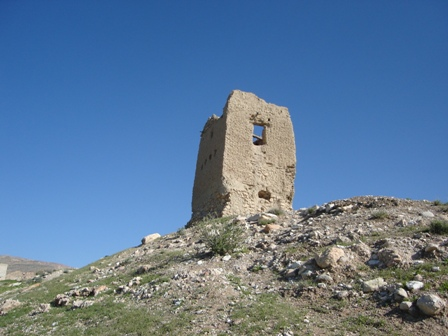
Ghalaeh Balangestan or Balangestan Castle قلعه بالنگستان فداغ

Balangestan (Persian: بالنگستان) is a garden and castle about 8 km (5.0 mi) north of Fedagh (Fidaq) in an area of good weather. Fedagh is one of the villages of Larestan County in the Fars province of Iran. Balangestan is a noted tourist attraction with a service station, picnic area and free access.

== Balangestan mountain ==
Balangestan mountain is a continuation of the south Zagros Mountains. It is one of the tallest mountains in Gerash and south Fars

There are some trees and plants such as Lime and date trees and a running water from mountains lotus, Persian turpentine tree, garden thyme and pennyroyal on the mountain that are irrigated by a local fountain. There is also animals like hyena, wolf, porcupine and rabbit on the mountain. There are also herbal plants on the mountain, such as thyme, chamomile, and wild almonds.

== See also ==
- Lar (Iran)
