= Zeynalabad, Kerman =

Zeynalabad زينل اباد
- Village
- Location within Iran
- Coordinates: 28°46′38″N 57°34′05″E
- Country: Iran
- Province: Kerman
- County: Jiroft
- Bakhsh: Central
- Rural District: Halil

Population (2006)
  - Total: 57
- Time zone: UTC+3:30 (IRST)
  - Summer (DST): UTC+4:30 (IRDT)

Zeynalabad (Persian: زينل اباد, also Romanized as Zeynalābād) is a village in Halil Rural District, in the Central District of Jiroft County, Kerman Province, Iran. At the 2006 census, its population was 57, in 14 families.
