= Gazdan, Kohgiluyeh and Boyer-Ahmad =

Gazdan گزدان
- Village
- Location within Iran
- Coordinates: 31°01′19″N 51°14′30″E
- Country: Iran
- Province: Kohgiluyeh and Boyer-Ahmad
- County: Dana
- Bakhsh: Pataveh
- Rural District: Pataveh

Population (2006)
  - Total: 236
- Time zone: UTC+3:30 (IRST)
  - Summer (DST): UTC+4:30 (IRDT)

Gazdan (Persian: گزدان, also Romanized as Gazdān; also known as Gardūn) is a village in Pataveh Rural District, Pataveh District, Dana County, Kohgiluyeh and Boyer-Ahmad Province, Iran. At the 2006 census, its population was 236, in 50 families.
