= Gazdan-e Abbas Abdollah =

Gazdan-e Abbas Abdollah گزدان عباس عبداله
- Village
- Location within Iran
- Coordinates: 27°16′25″N 53°21′40″E
- Country: Iran
- Province: Fars
- County: Lamerd
- Bakhsh: Central
- Rural District: Sigar

Population (2006)
  - Total: 117
- Time zone: UTC+3:30 (IRST)
  - Summer (DST): UTC+4:30 (IRDT)

Gazdan-e Abbas Abdollah (Persian: گزدان عباس عبداله, also Romanized as Gazdān-e 'Abbās 'Abdollāh; also known as Gazdān-e Sheykh, Gazdān Sheykh, and Gezdān Sheykh) is a village in Sigar Rural District, in the Central District of Lamerd County, Fars province, Iran. At the 2006 census, its population was 117, in 21 families.
