= Gazdan, Bandar Lengeh =

Gazdan گزدان
- Village
- Location within Iran
- Coordinates: 26°51′56″N 53°52′59″E
- Country: Iran
- Province: Hormozgan
- County: Bandar Lengeh
- Bakhsh: Shibkaveh
- Rural District: Moqam

Population (2006)
  - Total: 116
- Time zone: UTC+3:30 (IRST)
  - Summer (DST): UTC+4:30 (IRDT)

Gazdan (Persian: گزدان, also Romanized as Gazdān) is a village in Moqam Rural District, Shibkaveh District, Bandar Lengeh County, Hormozgan Province, Iran. At the 2006 census, its population was 116, in 23 families.
