= Arad Sawat =

Israeli production designer (born 1975)

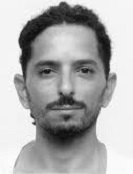
- Born: 23 January 1975 (age 51); Israel
- Occupation: Production designer
- Years active: 1996-present

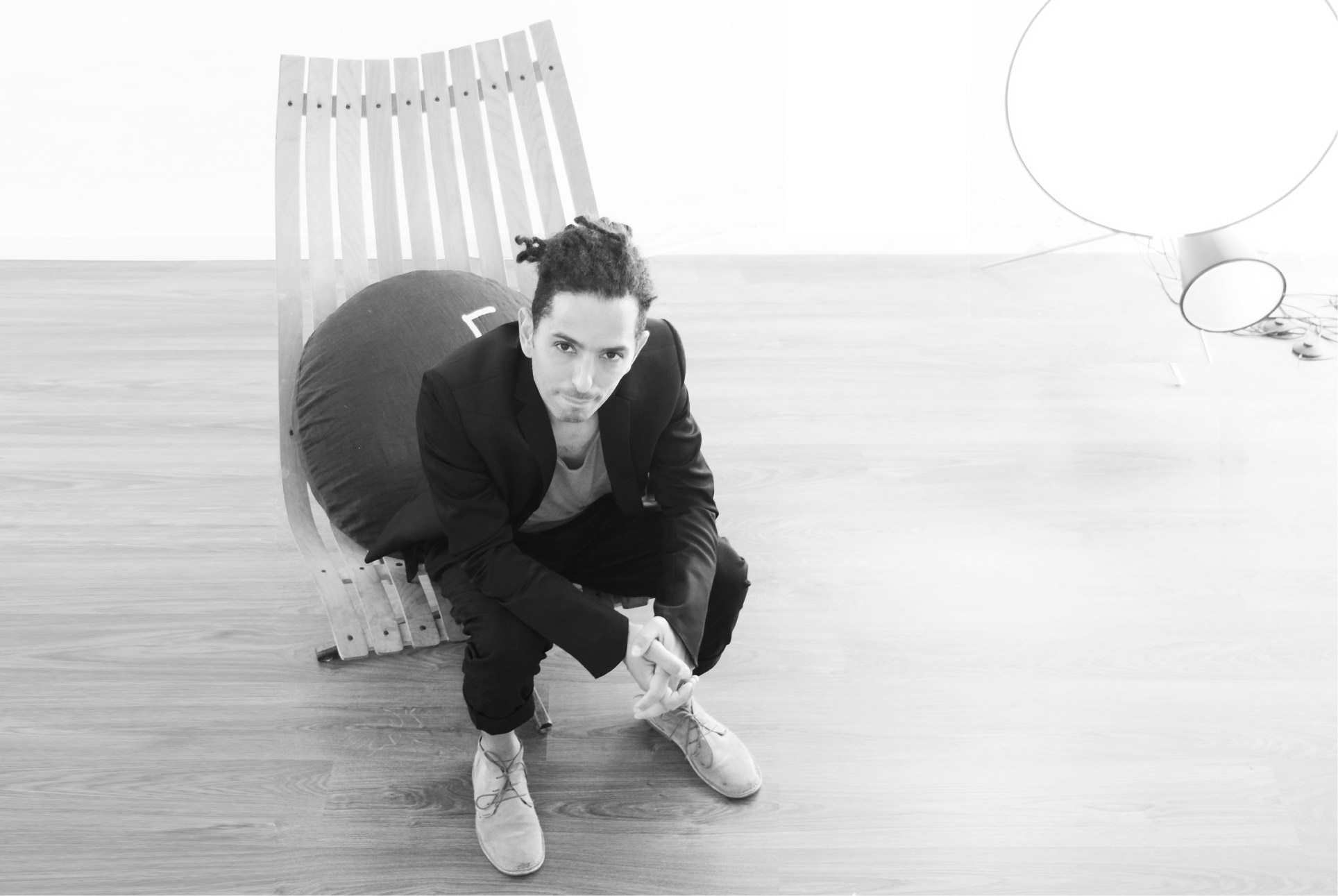
Arad Sawat

Arad Sawat (born January 23, 1975), is an Israeli set and production designer for television and in the film industry. He has designed and created sets for many television drama series and feature films, as well as designing conceptual spaces for industrial complexes. Sawat received international acclaim for his artistic design in Oscar-nominated Footnote (2011), winner of the Best Screenplay Award at the 2011 Cannes Film Festival. He is a three time Ophir Award winner for Best Artistic Direction.

== Biography ==
=== Early life ===
He was born in Tzfat, Israel, to Jewish parents. In 1993 he enlisted in the IDF and served in the Intelligence Corps. On completion of his military service in 1996 he moved to Tel Aviv.

=== Career ===
In 1996 Sawat began work as a props man and stylist for television. In the late 90s he began working as a set designer in television productions, as well as designing sets for commercial advertising. In particular, he designed and created sets which were built outside the television studios.

Over the years he broadened the scope of his portfolio, and applied his professional expertise to include architectural and spatial design in commercial and industrial complexes.

In 2011, based on his experience in set, product and interior design, Sawat began working in feature film production design. On the same year, his first feature film credit as a production designer, Footnote, was released. For his work on the film, he was awarded the Israeli Film Academy Award for best production design. Following the film's great success, Sawat continued to work with leading directors.

In 2014, Sawat designed Natalie Portman's debut film as a director, A Tale of Love and Darkness, based on the autobiographical best seller by Amos Oz. The film premiered at the 2015 Cannes Film Festival. Following his second visit to Cannes, Sawat drew the attention of international film industry professionals. In 2016 he was signed by the Dattner Dispoto and Associates talent agency, and has since begun to focus on international projects.

Today Sawat lives between Marseille and Berlin and works in France US, Germany, Tel Aviv, Croatia, Bulgaria, Morocco, Singapore, India, and China.

He is in a relationship with film director and writer Maysaloun Hamoud and they have a daughter named Layla. In 2023, the couple co-founded Layla Productions, a production company developing original content described as crossing national, ethnic, and gender boundaries. That same year, Sawat began co-writing the feature screenplay Weekend with Hamoud, marking a transition from production design toward directing.

Recently, Sawat has also been involved with Chai, an association that commissions immersive art installations commemorating individuals who risked their lives to save others during the Second World War. The installations combine video art, surround sound, sculpture, and architecture, and are presented in public spaces and cultural institutions and beyond.

== Design Projects ==
=== Cinema ===
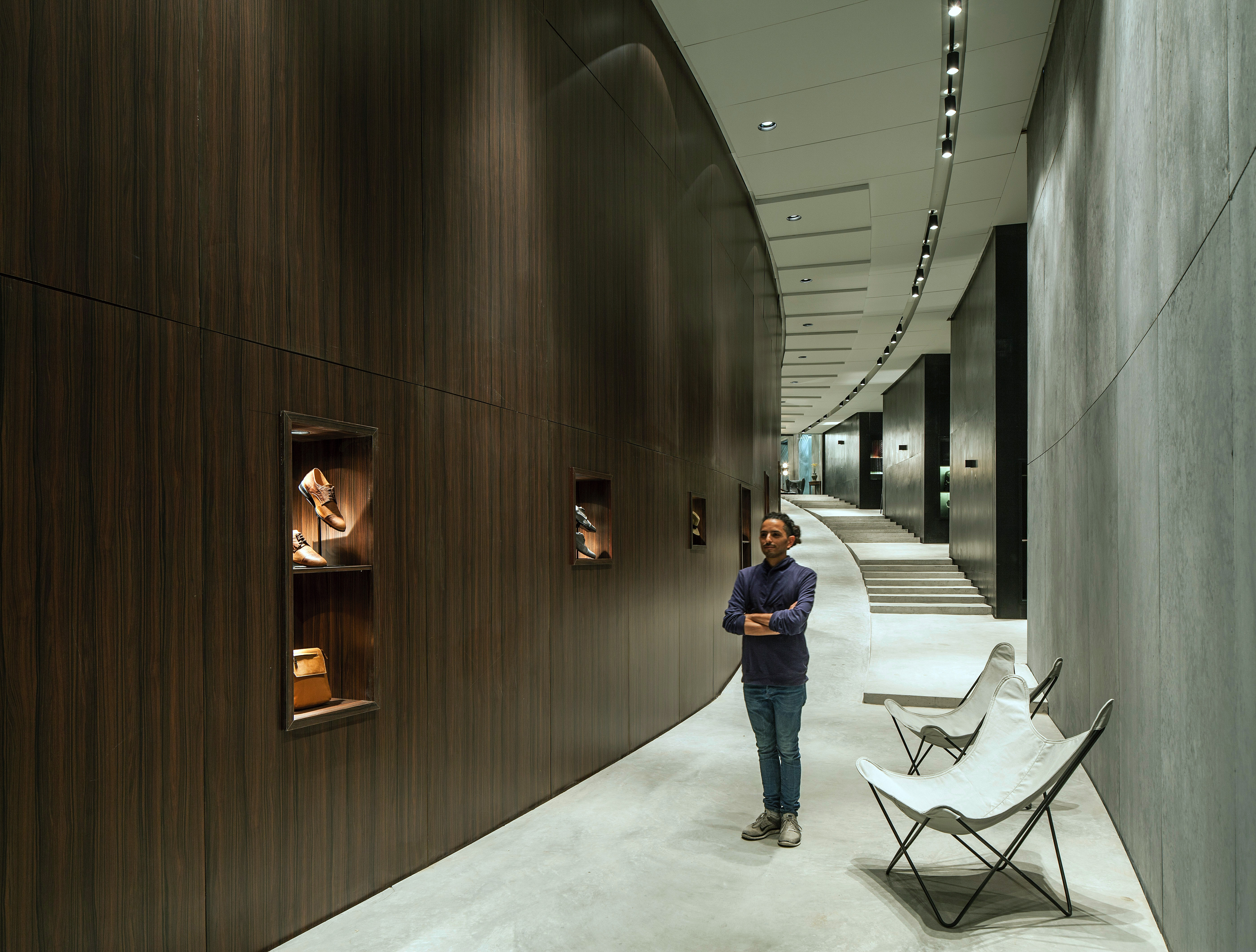
Sawat on the Lanvin store set designed by him, during shooting of Norman

- Beirut (2018)
- Foxtrot (2017)
- Norman (2016)
- A Tale of Love and Darkness (2015)
- The Farewell Party (2014)
- Self Made (2014)
- Up the Wrong Tree (2013)
- Big Bad Wolves (2013)
- 70 Years Venezia – the Venice International Festival (2013)
- Hunting Elephants (2013)
- The Dealers (2012)
- Bananas (2012)
- Footnote (2011)

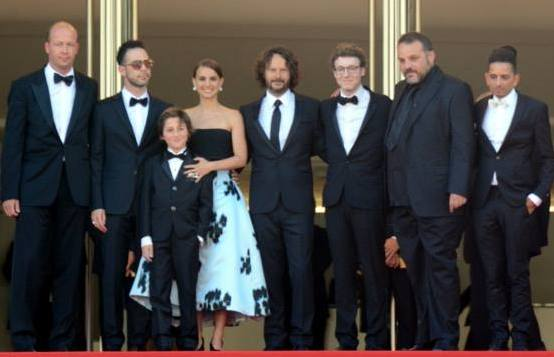
Sawat at the 2015 Cannes Film Festival, with lead crew members of A Tale of Love and Darkness

=== Television series ===
- Our Boys (2019)
- Absentia (2017+2019)
- Breaking Waves (2014)
- North Star (2014)
- Sabri Maranan (2013)
- Tanuchi! (2012)
- Alifim (2011)
- Fifteen Minutes (2011)
- A Wonderful Divorce (2010) (Season 1)
- Asfur (2010) (Seasons 1, 2)
- Hatzarot Sheli Im Nashim (2010)
- Tichon HaShir Shelanu (2009)
- HaShir Shelanu (2009)
- Hasufim (2008) (Seasons 1, 2)
- HaShminiya (2007) (Seasons 1, 2, 3)
- HaPijamot (2004)

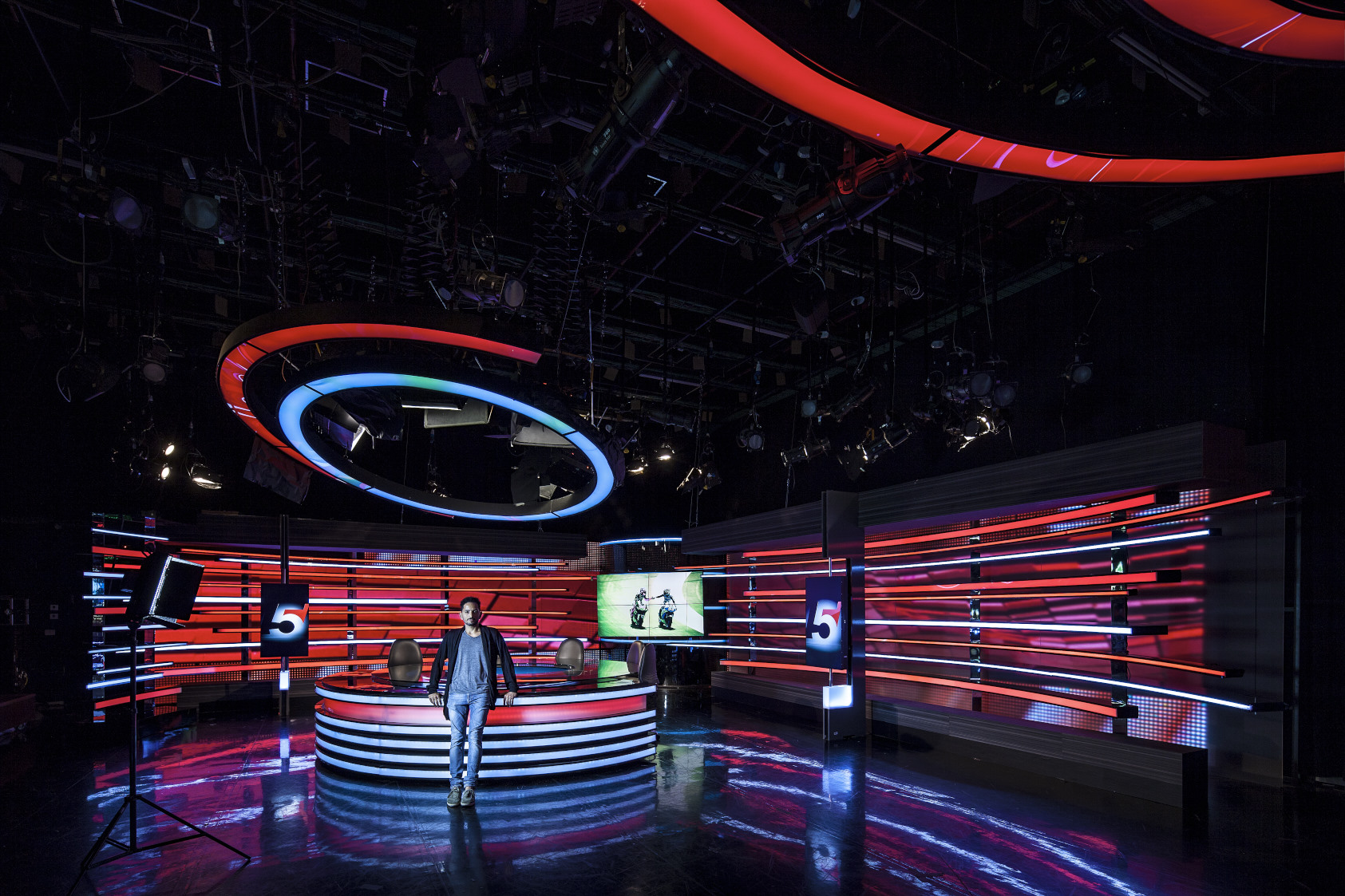
Israel Sports News Studio designed by Sawat

=== Commercial Spaces ===
- Studio for Fox Sports, Singapore. (2014)
- Gallery Studio, Israel (2014)
- STAR TV Studio, India (2013)
- Israel Sports News Studio (2013)
- Gindi Soferim Retail Arcade (2012)

== Awards ==
- Israeli Film Academy Award for Best Artistic Design in Foxtrot.
- Israeli Film Academy Award for Best Artistic Design in Big Bad Wolves (the film won the Saturn Award for the best foreign film and best soundtrack 2013).
- Israeli Film Academy Award for Best Artistic Design in Footnote (the film won the best screenplay award at the 2011 Cannes Film Festival – Prix du Scenario, and was nominated for an Oscar award).
