= Arad (surname) =

Arad (אָרַד) is a surname from the Hebrew word for bronze. Notable people with the surname include:

- Atar Arad (born 1945), Israeli-American violist; older brother to Ron
- Avi Arad (born 1948), Israeli-American businessperson; current CEO of Marvel Studios
- Boaz Arad (1956–2018), Israeli visual artist
- Dori Arad (born 1982), Israeli footballer
- Kobi Arad, American jazz musician
- Maya Arad (born 1971), American-based Israeli writer
- Michael Arad (born 1969), Israeli-American architect
- Moshe Arad (1934–2019), Romanian-Israeli diplomat
- Naama Arad (born 1985), Israeli sculptor and installation artist
- Nava Arad (1938–2022), Israeli politician
- Ofri Arad (born 1998), Israeli footballer
- Ron Arad, multiple people
  - Ron Arad (industrial designer) (born 1951), Israeli industrial designer, architect, and artist; younger brother to Atar
  - Ron Arad (pilot) (born 1958), Israeli Air Force weapon systems officer; classified as missing in action since 1986
- Roy Arad (born 1977), Israeli journalist, poet and artist
- Shira Arad (born 1972), Israeli film editor and musical supervisor
- Uzi Arad (born 1947), Israeli strategist and scholar
- Wedem Arad (died 1314), Emperor of the Ethiopian Empire and a member of the Solomonic dynasty
- Yael Arad (born 1967), Israeli judoka and first Israeli to win an Olympic medal
- Yitzhak Arad (1926–2021), born as Iccak Rudnicki), Lithuanian-Israeli historian of the Holocaust
- Zvi Arad (1942–2018), Israeli mathematician, acting president of Bar-Ilan University, president of Netanya Academic College

== See also ==
- Arad (given name), list of people with the given name
