= Gazdan, Shahr-e Babak =

Gazdan گزدان
- Village
- Location within Iran
- Coordinates: 30°34′02″N 54°45′43″E
- Country: Iran
- Province: Kerman
- County: Shahr-e Babak
- Bakhsh: Dehaj
- Rural District: Khabar

Population (2006)
  - Total: 38
- Time zone: UTC+3:30 (IRST)
  - Summer (DST): UTC+4:30 (IRDT)

Gazdan (Persian: گزدان, also Romanized as Gazdān; also known as Gazdūn) is a village in Khabar Rural District, Dehaj District, Shahr-e Babak County, Kerman Province, Iran. At the 2006 census, its population was 38, in 5 families.
