= Gazdan, Jask =

Gazdan گزدان
- Village
- Location within Iran
- Coordinates: 25°45′59″N 57°47′46″E
- Country: Iran
- Province: Hormozgan
- County: Jask
- Bakhsh: Central
- Rural District: Jask

Population (2006)
  - Total: 728
- Time zone: UTC+3:30 (IRST)
  - Summer (DST): UTC+4:30 (IRDT)

Gazdan (Persian: گزدان, also Romanized as Gazdān; also known as Lordān) is a village in Jask Rural District, in the Central District of Jask County, Hormozgan Province, Iran. At the 2006 census, its population was 728, in 146 families.
