= Gerash =

City in Fars province, Iran

Gerash Persian: گراش
- City
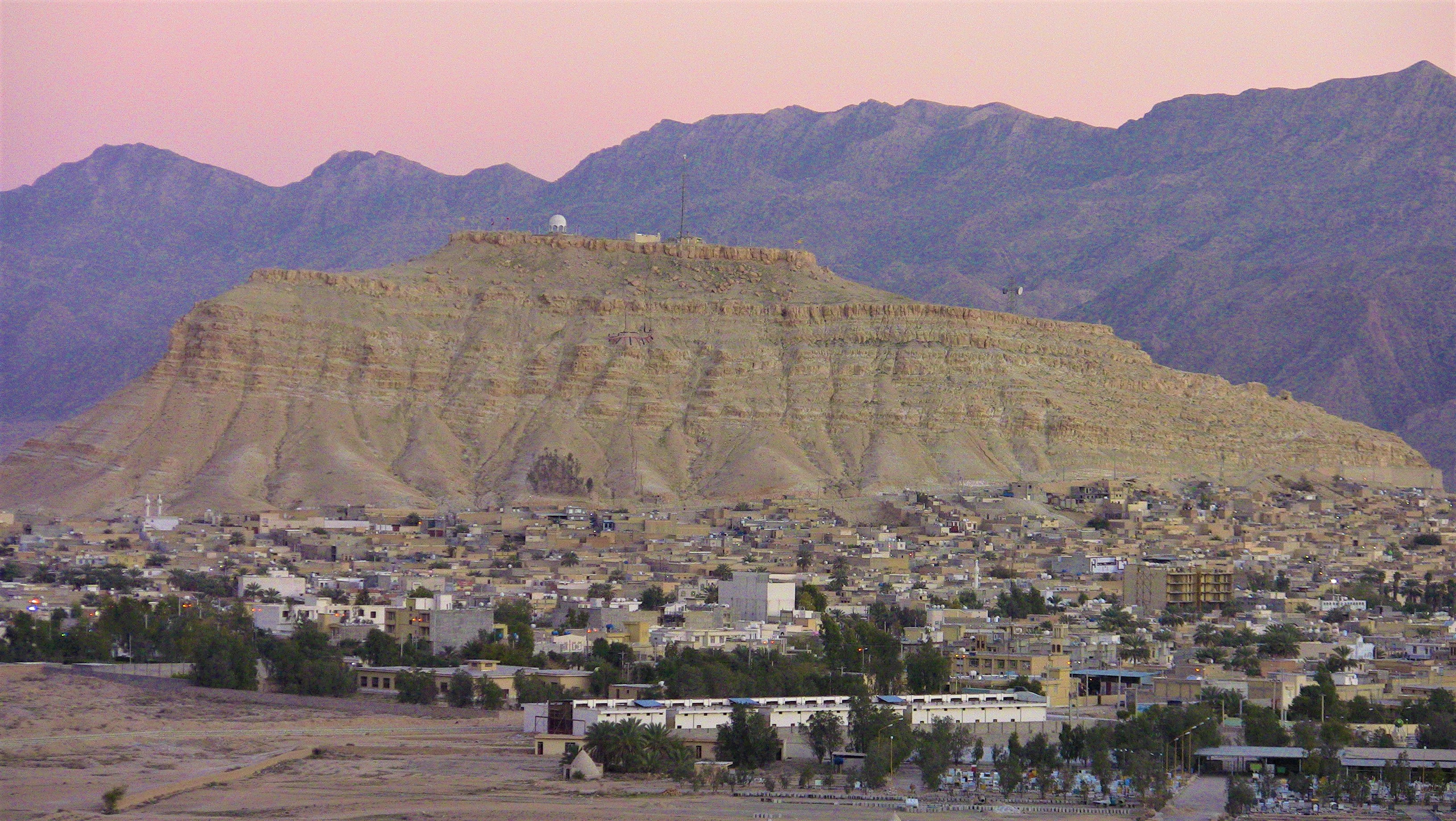
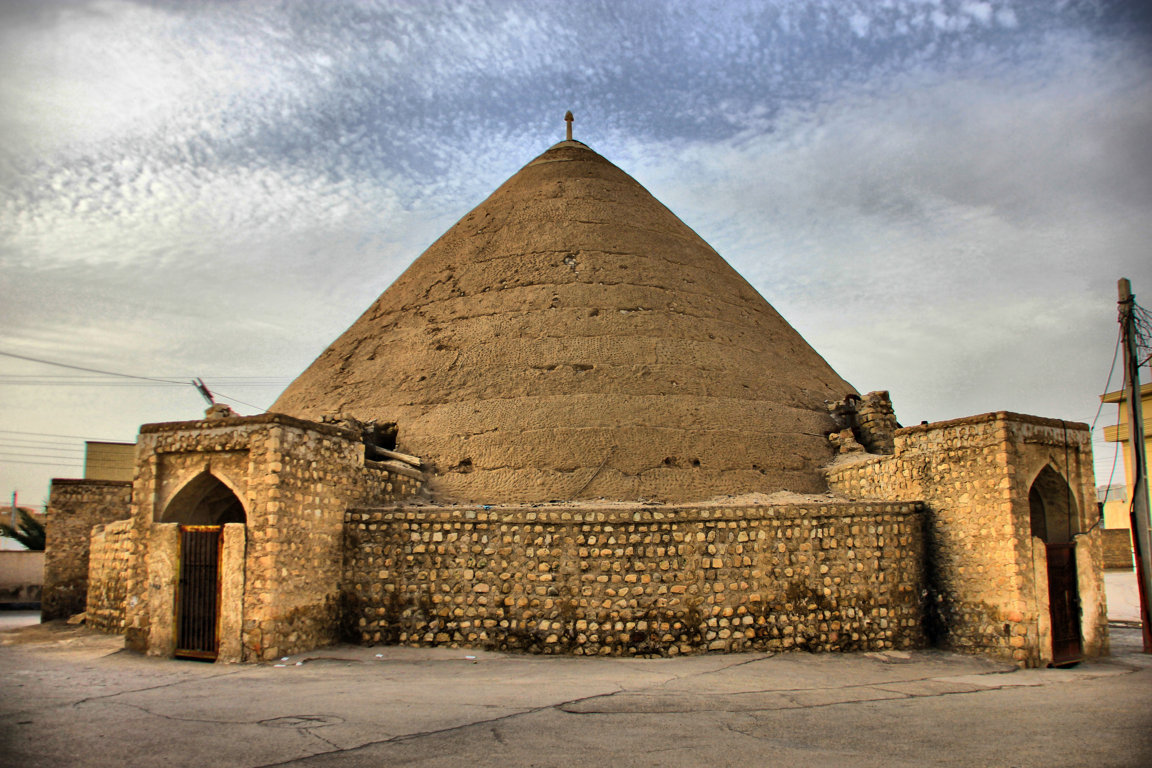
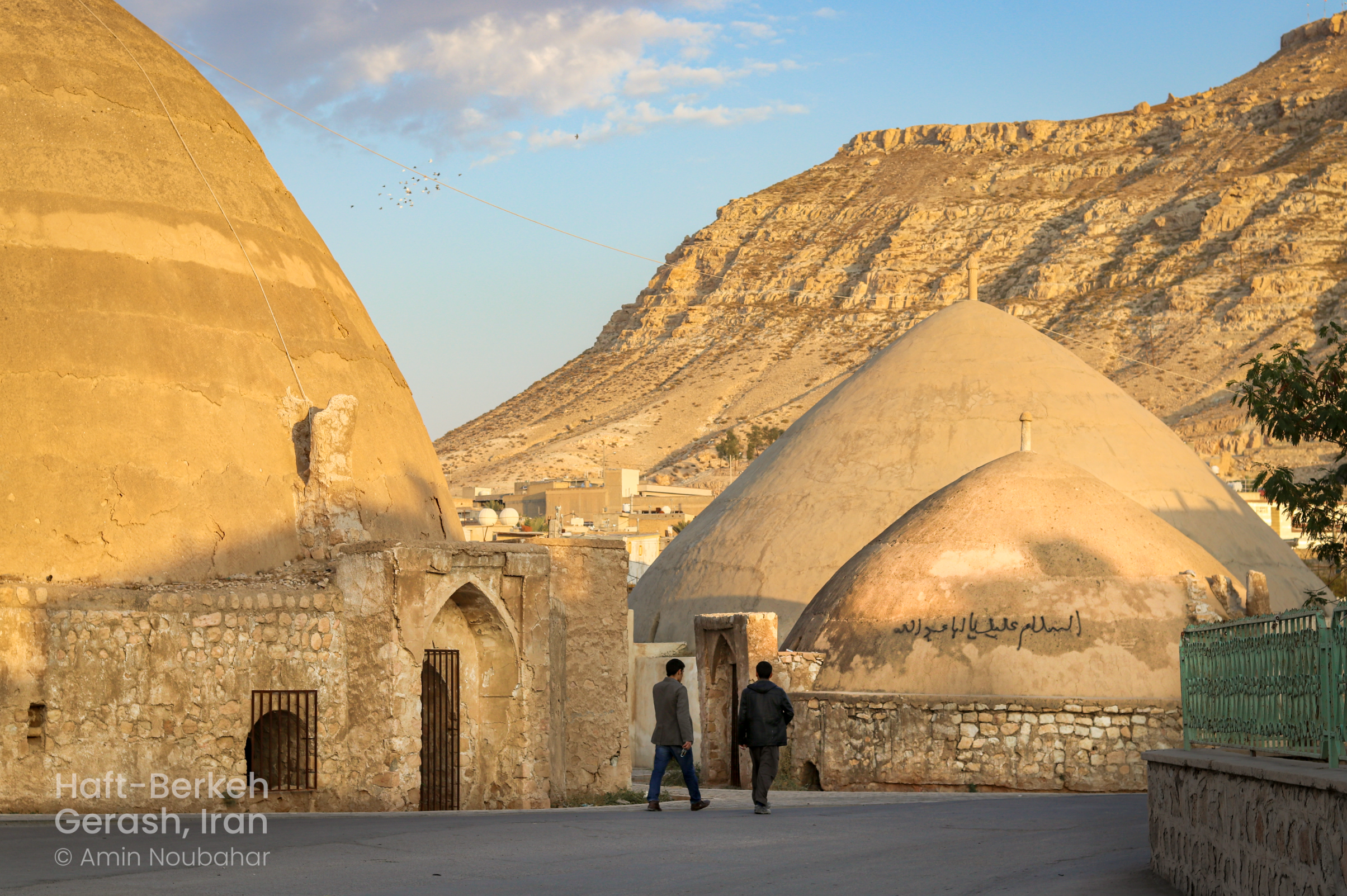
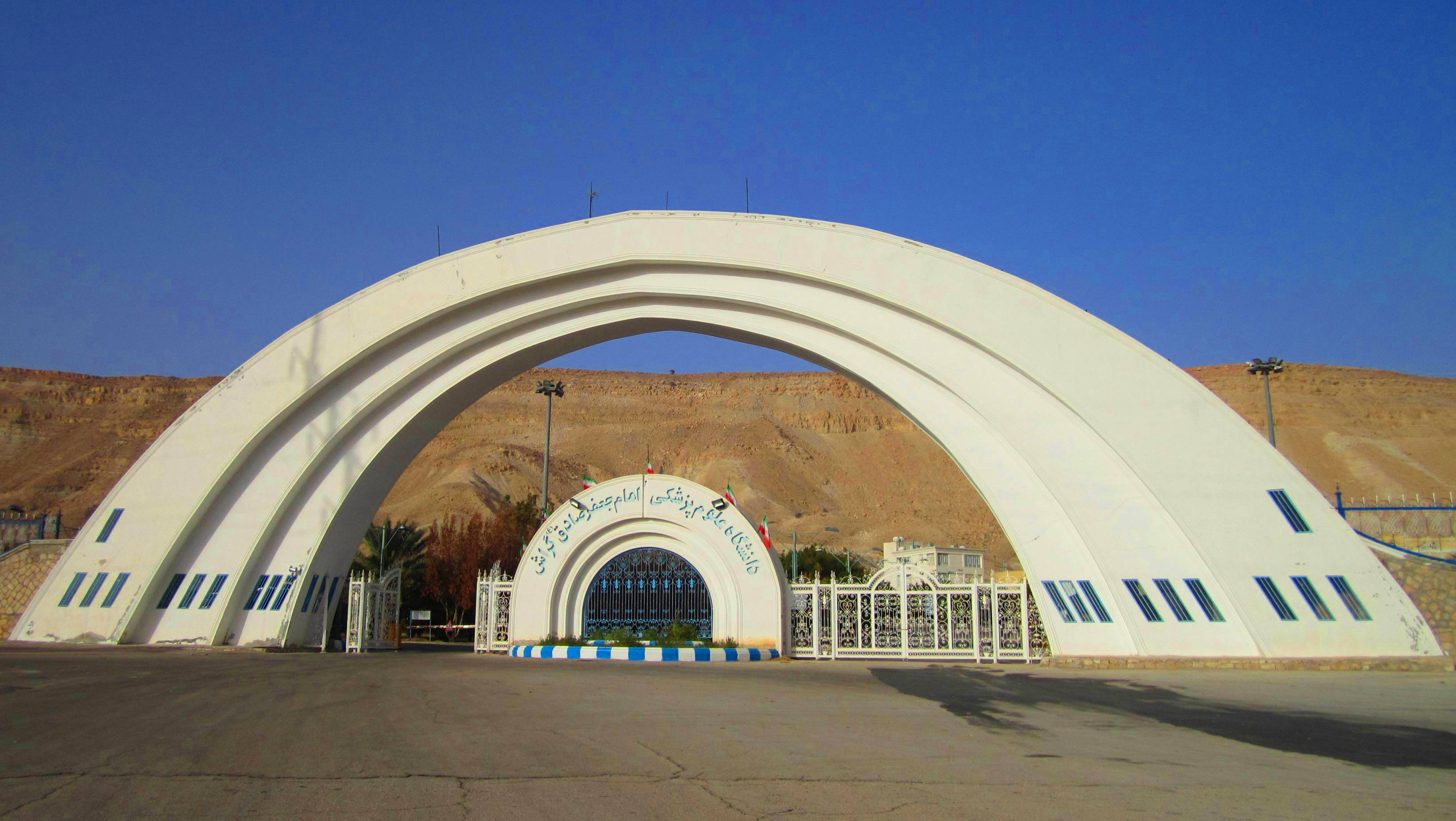
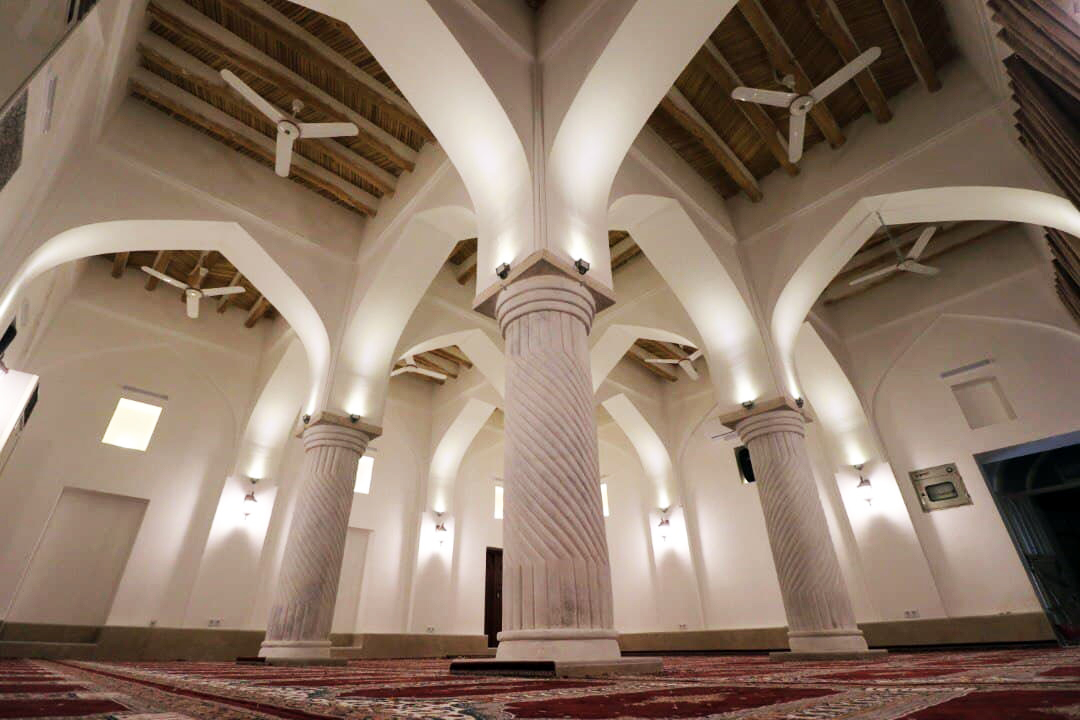
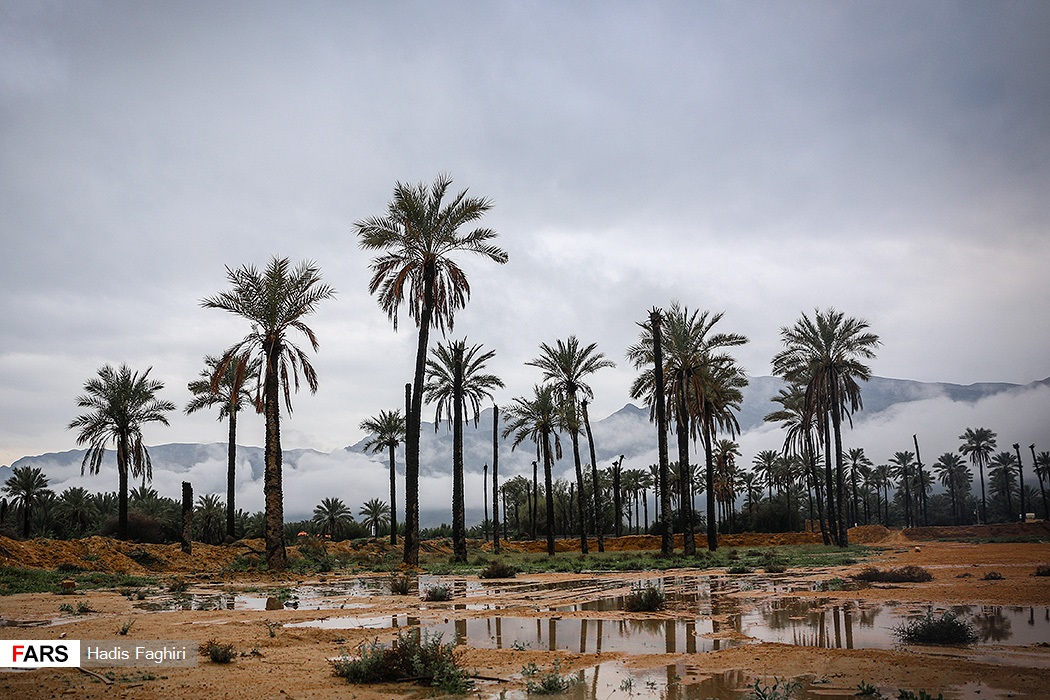
- From top, left to right: Gerash skyline and Kalat mountain, Berkeh Haj Asadollah, Haft Berkeh, College of Medical Sciences entrance, Akhond mosque, The nature of Gerash in spring

- Location in Iran, the Middle East, Asia and the world Gerash (Middle East)
- Coordinates: 27°40′00″N 54°08′28″E
- Country: Iran
- Province: Fars
- County: Gerash
- District: Central

Government
  - Mayor: Mahdi Halimi

Area
  - Total: 15.65 km^{2} (6.04 sq mi)
- Elevation: 914 m (2,999 ft)

Population (2016)
  - Total: 34,469
  - Density: 2,202/km^{2} (5,704/sq mi)
  - Population Rank in Fars Province: 15th
  - Population Rank in Iran: 243rd
- Demonym: Achomi
- Time zone: UTC+3:30 (IRST)
- Area code: (+98) 071
- Website: gerash.ir

Gerash (Persian: گراش) (Note: Also Romanized as Gerāsh; also known as Girāsh) is a city in the Central District of Gerash County, Fars province, Iran, serving as capital of both the county and the district.

== History ==
The people of Gerash were native Persians following the Zoroastrian faith before converting to Shia Islam in the 5th century of Hijrah (11th century AD) by Amir Mohi al-Din Ibn Amir Qotb al-Din Ibn Amir Rooh al-Din, a direct descendant of Muhammad, and an aide of Afeef-Addeen Al Musawi, to whom the conquest of certain areas in the South of Iran by Arab Muslim warriors is attributed.

It is known that Afeef-Addeen left Hijaz (in present-day Saudi Arabia) along with warriors from two tribes from Medina, namely Hawazin Bani Al-Muntafiq and Banu Tamim, and set for the conquest of the Persian South; areas that, due to their dry conditions and mountainous terrain, had remained immune to the Islamic conquests during the second Caliphate's time. Prior to its conversion to Islam, Gerash was ruled by a Zoroastrian leader by the name of Sarem Khoora (Persian).

Descendants of Amir Mohyeddin today include the Saadat family of Gerash, who are commonly known by the prefix "Mir", which is a short-form for the word "Amir" (Arabic for either "Prince" or "Commander"; commander in this case). This prefix is set in recognition of the family's ancestry, which, as outlined above, includes Muslim warriors who contributed to the Islamic conquests of Southern Persia. Younger members of the family have generally lost this prefix.

Many Gerashis have emigrated to the Persian Gulf countries such as UAE, Qatar, Bahrain and Kuwait, working in micro structural variety stores, manual commodity movements, confidential-exports by motorboats, and other similar professions. Recently, migrating locations have changed to include the United Kingdom, United States, and in some cases Canada. The cost-effectiveness of Eastern Europe makes it a favorite destination for those students who have a passion for learning

== Demographics ==
=== Language ===
Gerashis speak Achomi, a language shared with many neighboring cities including Evaz, Arad, Fedagh, Khonj, and Bastak.

The Gerashi variant of the Achomi language includes two accents: Nassagi (ناساگی) and Barqe-Roozi (برق روزی, commonly known as Belalizi).

Despite the high volatility in the population due to seasonal migration, the population is estimated to be at between 30,000 and 50,000.

Gerashis refer to themselves as Khodmooni, a term literally meaning "part of ourselves" but figuratively used to refer to people from Gerash, Evaz, Khonj, Arad, Fedagh, Pishwar and other neighboring cities that share a common language known as "Achomi".

=== Population ===
At the time of the 2006 National Census, the city's population was 27,574 in 6,261 households, when it was the capital of the former Gerash District of Larestan County. (Note: Formerly Lar County)

The following census in 2011 counted 30,593 people in 8,411 households, by which time the district had been separated from the county in the establishment of Gerash County. Gerash was transferred to the new Central District as the county's capital.

The 2016 census measured the population of the city as 34,469 people in 10,209 households.

== Attractions ==
=== Historical monuments ===
The most notable monument in the city is Kalat. Being located in the center of the city, this hill has now come to shape the very architecture of Gerash, having residential areas built all around it. Historically, Kalat has been home to fierce warriors who've sought refuge in the now demolished "Kalaa" or fort that was built at some point in the city's history to protect it from offenders.

=== Water storage ===
Of the influential artefacts, Berka has had a special place in Gerashis' hearts. Numerous Berkas have been created by philanthropists to save people from dehydration. Such practice still continues in spite of the creation of modern water-pipe capabilities.

==== Berke Kaal (Kal Pond) ====
The Berke Kaal (aab-anbaar) is one of the biggest reservoirs made in Iran. Unfortunately, there are not any entries or inscription on the structure of this building. This aab-anbaar has been built and dedicated by Haaj Asad-o-llah son of Karbalaei Alireza Gerashi and the brother of FathAli Khan named as Biglar Beigi Sab’eh Larestan.

The internal diameter of the pond is 19 metres (62 ft). The pond's depth is 21 metres (69 ft), equal to the height of a seven floor building. As residents say its depth had been 12 heights (ghad) and each height has been equal to 175 cm (69 in). According to oral accounts of past, the dome of this aab-anbaar has immediately collapsed a few days after it has been built due to raining and its ruins are visible at the bottom of the pond. Despite, in its kind, its structure and even covering the roof of 19-metre (62 ft) diameter with traditional materials are considered as a masterpiece in architecture.

The pond includes six openings which lead raining water into the water storage and all six openings were utilized for withdrawing the water. All entrances have pointed arch but their dimensions are different. The places for entering the water are smaller and are lower than the other entrances’ bottoms. And the curved stone has been used in its materials. At the internal body of one of the portals, stone stairs are embedded for descending and reaching the aab-anbaar bottom. Its tank as existing water storages’ are circle- shaped and the used materials is mortar. It is vital to mention that to facilitate taking the water, the bottom diameter is one meter thicker than the diameter of its top.

The body wall (shavereh) which has 1.2-metre (3 ft 11 in) diameter at portal floor and 2-metre (6 ft 7 in) diameter as reaching the height and the beginning of the dome's arch, also the openings and facades’ arch which are pointed, are made of stone and chalk materials. And only the arches of its input and output channels which are pointed are made of stone and mortar. And the stone stairs are placed at the northern part of the building.

==== Seven water storages [aab-anbaar] (Seven Ponds) ====
These seven water storages which are made in different periods and sizes, are placed close to each other. And they are located on the way of a seasonal river called “Bezerd” in Nasag Neighborhood. Five of these seven water storages have dome on the roof and two of them have no roof. The greatest and most famous one is called as Haj Abol-Hassan Pond whose features are as below.

According to epigraph attached to the north east portal, this monument was constructed by Haj Abol-hassan, son of Haj Hassan (the founder of “Chaahaar-taakh”) and its unique feature is that the tank wall from the south east opening as well as the openings on the other sides goes along to the bottom of the water storage.

The tank is circle-shaped and the arches of water input and output channels are placed at the west side of first and fourth openings.

Its bottom, unlike other water storages, is placed at the same surface with openings and arches and is crescent shape. Openings and portal arches are pointed, and the second and fifth portal arches have cornice decorations. The facades are higher than the wall and as the main body wall are made of stone and chalk materials. The dome is made of stone and chalk and daubed by mortar.

Seven Ponds is one of the limited numbers of heritages which are nationally registered in Pahlavi period. In its registration file is the signature of Mr. Karim Pirnia, who is the father of Iran traditional architecture.

==== Tag-e-Av historical dam ====
The city antiquity goes back to “Sasanian” age (224-651 A.D) due to the existence of a historic dam called “Tag-e-Av”.

The “Tange Ab” dam in Gersh, Fars province, is located in a canyon with the same name in the south west part of Gerash, in the Black mountain and under the peak called “Bon-e-Morok”. It belongs to Sasanid era and has been reconstructed at Safavid period when three clamps have been built to prevent its destruction.

Materials used in dam and the clamps are stone and mortar and a water stream with the same material has been drawn, for irrigation, from the dam up to a plain named as “Dasht-e-Baraa”. On the way of this stream to the mouth of the canyon, two pools made of mortar has been also constructed. Now, behind the dam is fully filled with sediment on which the cedar tree can be seen. This monument has been registered in Iran national heritage index in 2001.

=== Gerash Castle (Homayoun Dezh) ===
The castle, whose ruins are now remained, is placed on a big pile with the height of 1,070 metres (3,510 ft) above sea level, called "Kalaat" around which the city has been developed. The castle includes a number of houses, a mosque, and a bath in the western part, Narenj castle with azure rhomboid tiles with dimension of 9x1 and 9x2, the prison and some mortar water storages.

At the northern part of the castle, there is a big house called Narenj which belonged to the ruler. It includes two garrets in the north, and mirror-worked rooms in the east. In the south, on top of the portal there had been a tower called “Borj-e-Baargaah”.

=== The House of Azimis, the Martyrs (Anthropology Museum of Gerash) ===
By observing the entrance plan it will be found that it is an L-shaped house. Immediately after passing through the filtering place, we will reach the central yard which is the common place in all traditional houses of Gerash. But what changes the atmosphere of the house is not using an integrated portico which is located from the bottom up to the second floor. In this house, each floor has its own portico (Ivan) with the same plan which is enclosed by the columns and space existing in its depth. So we do not see the integrated portico in this house.

Due to restoration done by the Gerash Cultural Heritage Lovers Society, this house’s status is one of the best among historical monuments and is nationally registered as a cultural heritage and anthropology museum.

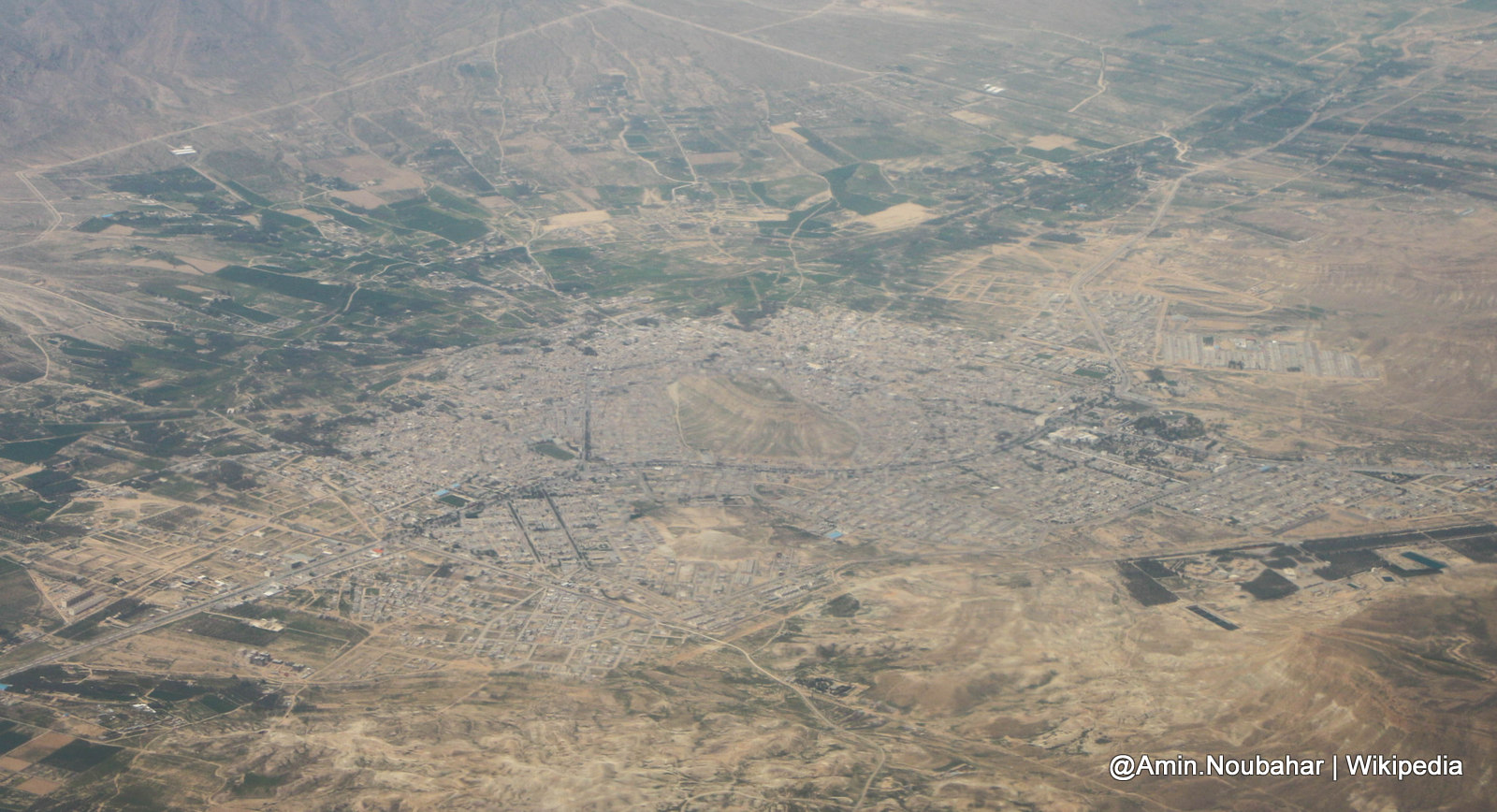
Aerial view of Gerash
