= Khalili Rural District =

Rural district in Fars province, Iran

Khalili Rural District Persian: دهستان خلیلی
- Rural District
- Location within Iran
- Coordinates: 27°37′56″N 53°20′43″E
- Country: Iran
- Province: Fars
- County: Gerash
- District: Central
- Capital: Khalili

Population (2016)
  - Total: 3,720
- Time zone: UTC+3:30 (IRST)

Khalili Rural District (Persian: دهستان خلیلی) is in the Central District of Gerash County, Fars province, Iran. Its capital is the village of Khalili.

== History ==
In November 2008, Beyram, Evaz, and Gerash Districts were separated from Larestan County (Note: Formerly Lar County) in the establishment of Gerash County, which was divided into three districts of two rural districts each, with Gerash as its capital. However, Beyram and Evaz Districts were returned to Larestan County six months later, and at the same time, Khalili Rural District was created in the Central District.

== Demographics ==
=== Population ===
At the time of the 2011 National Census, the rural district's population was 3,382 in 892 households. The 2016 census measured the population of the rural district as 3,720 in 937 households. The most populous of its nine villages was Khalili, with 1,582 people.
