= Arad District =

District in Fars province, Iran

Arad District Persian: بخش ارد
- District

- Location within Iran
- Coordinates: 27°42′23″N 53°44′33″E
- Country: Iran
- Province: Fars
- County: Gerash
- Capital: Arad

Population (2016)
  - Total: 7,029
- Time zone: UTC+3:30 (IRST)

Arad District (Persian: بخش ارد) is in Gerash County, Fars province, Iran. Its capital is the city of Arad.

== History ==
In November 2008, Beyram, Evaz, and Gerash Districts were separated from Larestan County (Note: Formerly Lar County) in the establishment of Gerash County, which was divided into three districts of two rural districts each, with Gerash as its capital. However, Beyram and Evaz Districts were returned to Larestan County six months later. At the same time, Arad Rural District was separated from the Central District in the formation of Arad District.

After the 2016 National Census, the village of Arad was elevated to the status of a city.

== Demographics ==
=== Population ===
At the time of the 2011 census, the district's population was 7,136 people in 1,988 households. The 2016 census measured the population of the district as 7,029 inhabitants in 2,019 households.

Arad District Population
Administrative Divisions	2011	2016
Arad RD	5,767	5,443
Sabz Push RD	1,369	1,586
Arad (city) (Note: Became a city after the 2016 census)		
Total	7,136	7,029
RD = Rural District
