= Fedagh Rural District =

Rural district in Fars province, Iran

Fedagh Rural District Persian: دهستان فداغ
- Rural District
- Location within Iran
- Coordinates: 27°36′38″N 53°52′33″E
- Country: Iran
- Province: Fars
- County: Gerash
- District: Central
- Capital: Fedagh

Population (2023)
  - Total: 10,000+
- Time zone: UTC+3:30 (IRST)

Fedagh Rural District (Persian: دهستان فداغ) is in the Central District of Gerash County, Fars province, Iran. Its capital is the village of Fedagh.

== Demographics ==
=== Population ===
At the time of the 2006 National Census, the rural district's population (as a part of the former Gerash District of Larestan County) (Note: Formerly Lar County) was 5,210 in 1,027 households. There were 5,944 inhabitants in 1,562 households at the following census of 2011, by which time the district had been separated from the county in the establishment of Gerash County. The rural district was transferred to the new Central District. The 2016 census measured the population of the rural district as 8,689 in 1,992 households. The most populous of its 21 villages was Fedagh, with 6,533 people.
