= Arad Rural District =

Rural district in Fars province, Iran

Arad Rural District Persian: دهستان ارد
- Rural District
- Location within Iran
- Coordinates: 27°42′22″N 53°35′54″E
- Country: Iran
- Province: Fars
- County: Gerash
- District: Arad
- Capital: Arad

Population (2016)
  - Total: 5,443
- Time zone: UTC+3:30 (IRST)

Arad Rural District (Persian: دهستان ارد) is in Arad District of Gerash County, Fars province, Iran. It is administered from the city of Arad.

== Demographics ==
=== Population ===
At the time of the 2006 National Census, the rural district's population (as a part of the former Gerash District of Larestan County) (Note: Formerly Lar County) was 6,564 in 1,446 households. There were 5,767 inhabitants in 1,666 households at the following census of 2011, by which time the district had been separated from the county in the establishment of Gerash County. The rural district was transferred to the new Central District, and six months later was transferred to the new Arad District. The 2016 census measured the population of the rural district as 5,443 in 1,610 households. The most populous of its 11 villages was Arad (now a city), with 5,094 people.
