= Gerash District =

Former district in Fars province, Iran

Gerash District Persian: بخش گراش
- Former District
- Location within Iran
- Coordinates: 27°40′N 53°39′E
- Country: Iran
- Province: Fars
- County: Larestan
- Capital: Gerash

Population (2006)
  - Total: 39,348
- Time zone: UTC+3:30 (IRST)

Gerash District (Persian: بخش گراش) is a former administrative division of Larestan County, (Note: Formerly Lar County) Fars province, Iran. Its capital was the city of Gerash.

== History ==
In 2008, the district was separated from the county in the establishment of Gerash County.

== Demographics ==
=== Population ===
At the time of the 2006 National Census, the district's population was 39,348 in 8,734 households.

=== Administrative divisions ===
Gerash District Population
Administrative Divisions	2006
Arad RD	6,564
Fedagh RD	5,210
Gerash (city)	27,574
Total	39,348
RD = Rural District
