= Central District (Gerash County) =

District in Fars province, Iran

Central District (Gerash County) Persian: بخش مرکزی شهرستان گراش
- District
- Location within Iran
- Coordinates: 27°36′30″N 53°41′15″E
- Country: Iran
- Province: Fars
- County: Gerash
- Capital: Gerash

Population (2016)
  - Total: 46,878
- Time zone: UTC+3:30 (IRST)

The Central District of Gerash County (Persian: بخش مرکزی شهرستان گراش) is in Fars province, Iran. Its capital is the city of Gerash.

== History ==
In 2008, Beyram, Evaz, and Gerash Districts were separated from Larestan County (Note: Formerly Lar County) in the establishment of Gerash County, which was divided into three districts of two rural districts each, with Gerash as its capital. However, Beyram and Evaz Districts were returned to Larestan County six months later. At the same time, Khalili Rural District was created in the Central District, and Arad Rural District was separated from it in the formation of Arad District.

== Demographics ==
=== Population ===
At the time of the 2011 National Census, the district's population was 39,919 people in 10,865 households. The 2016 census measured the population of the district as 46,878 inhabitants in 13,136 households.

=== Administrative divisions ===
Central District (Gerash County) Population
Administrative Divisions	2011	2016
Fedagh RD	5,944	8,689
Khalili RD	3,382	3,720
Gerash (city)	30,593	34,469
Total	39,919	46,878
RD = Rural District
