= Gerash County =

County in Fars province, Iran

Gerash County Persian: شهرستان گراش
- County
- Location of Gerash County in Fars province (bottom center, purple)

- Location of Fars province in Iran
- Coordinates: 27°40′00″N 53°41′15″E
- Country: Iran
- Province: Fars
- Capital: Gerash
- Districts: Central, Arad

Population (2016)
  - Total: 53,907
- Time zone: UTC+3:30 (IRST)

Gerash County (Persian: شهرستان گراش) is located in Fars province, Iran. Its capital is the city of Gerash.

== History ==
In November 2008, Beyram, Evaz, and Gerash Districts were separated from Larestan County (Note: Formerly Lar County) in the establishment of Gerash County, which was divided into three districts of two rural districts each, with Gerash as its capital. However, Beyram and Evaz Districts were returned to Larestan County six months later. At the same time, Khalili Rural District was created in the Central District, and Arad Rural District was separated from it in the formation of Arad District, which was divided into two rural districts, including the new Sabz Push Rural District.

After the 2016 National Census, the village of Arad was elevated to the status of a city.

== Demographics ==
=== Ethnicity ===
Gerash was traditionally part of the region of Irahistan. Gerash's inhabitants are Achomi people.

=== Population ===
At the time of the 2011 census, the county's population was 47,055 people in 12,839 households. The 2016 census measured the population of the county as 53,907 in 15,155 households.

=== Administrative divisions ===
Gerash County's population history and administrative structure over two consecutive censuses are shown in the following table.

Gerash County Population
Administrative Divisions	2011	2016
Central District	39,919	46,878
Fedagh RD	5,944	8,689
Khalili RD	3,382	3,720
Gerash (city)	30,593	34,469
Arad District	7,136	7,029
Arad RD	5,767	5,443
Sabz Push RD	1,369	1,586
Arad (city) (Note: Became a city after the 2016 census)		
Total	47,055	53,907
RD = Rural District

== See also ==
- Larestan
- Achomi people
- Khonj County
- Bastak and Bastak County
- Lamerd County

Media related to Gerash County at Wikimedia Commons
