= Dasht =

Dasht (Persian: دشت), Dasht-e, Dashhti (دشتی), or Dasht-i, are Persian words for "plain" or "plain of", and may refer to:

== Places ==
=== Afghanistan ===
- Dasht-e Borsoneh, a village in the Bamyan Province
- Dasht-e Leili desert, site of the alleged Dasht-e-Leili massacre
- Dasht-e Margo, a desert in Afghanistan
- Dasht Pang, a village in the Badakhshan Province

=== Armenia ===
- Dasht, Armenia, a town in the Armavir Province of Armenia

=== Iran ===
==== Geographic features ====
- Dasht-e Kavir, a desert in north-central and northeastern Iran
- Dasht-e Lut, desert in southeastern Iran

==== Localities ====
- Dasht Rural District (Meshgin Shahr County), a subdivision of Ardabil province
- Dashti, Chaharmahal and Bakhtiari, a village in Chaharmahal and Bakhtiari province
- Dashti County, a subdivision of Bushehr province
- Dashti-ye Esmail Khani, a village in Bushehr province
- Dashti-ye Esmail Khani Rural District, in Bushehr province
- Dasht, Fars, a village in Fars province
- Dashti, Fars, a village in Fars province
- Dashti, Golestan, a village in Golestan province
- Dashti, Hormozgan, a village in Hormozgan province
- Dashti, Ilam, a village in Ilam province
- Dashti, Isfahan, a village in Isfahan province
- Dasht Rural District (Isfahan Province), a subdivision of Isfahan province
- Dasht-e Bozorg, a village in Khuzestan province
- Dashti-ye Hoseyn Aqa, a village in Khuzestan province
- Dasht, North Khorasan, a village in North Khorasan province
- Dasht, Khvaf, a village in Khvaf County of Razavi Khorasan province
- Dasht, Nishapur, a village in Nishapur County of Razavi Khorasan province
- Dasht, South Khorasan, a village in South Khorasan province
- Dashti, West Azerbaijan, a village in West Azerbaijan province
- Dasht Rural District (Urmia County), a subdivision of West Azerbaijan province

=== Pakistan ===
- Dasht (Kharan), a town and tehsil of the Kharan District in the Balochistan province of Pakistan
- Dasht-i-Goran, a place in Chagai District, Balochistan, Pakistan
- Dasht Tehsil (Kech District), a tehsil of Kech District, Balochistan
- Dasht Tehsil (Mastung District), a tehsil of Mastung District, Balochistan

=== Tajikistan ===
- Dasht, Tajikistan, a site of the University of Central Asia campus

== People ==
- Lara Dashti (born 2004), Kuwaiti Olympic swimmer
- Yossi Dashti (born 1952), Israeli-American author, researcher and business facilitator
- Dashti or Dasti is another name for the Rind (tribe), a Baloch tribe of Baluchistan

== Music, film and television ==
- Dashti is one of the twelve Dastgahs in Persian Music
- Dasht (television series), a 1993 Pakistani drama series
- "Dasht-e-Tanhai" or "Yaad", an Urdu-language poem by Faiz Ahmed Faiz, sung by Iqbal Bano

== See also ==
- Dashtestan, a township in the northern part of the Bushehr Province of Iran
