= Basri, Bushehr =

Village in Bushehr province, Iran

Basri Persian: بصري
- Village
- Location within Iran
- Coordinates: 29°16′44″N 50°55′33″E
- Country: Iran
- Province: Bushehr
- County: Dashtestan
- District: Ab Pakhsh
- Rural District: Dashti-ye Esmail Khani

Population (2016)
  - Total: 106
- Time zone: UTC+3:30 (IRST)

Basri (Persian: بصري) (Note: Also romanized as Başrī) is a village in Dashti-ye Esmail Khani Rural District of Ab Pakhsh District in Dashtestan County, Bushehr province, Iran.

== Demographics ==
=== Population ===
At the time of the 2006 National Census, the village's population was 161 in 34 households, when it was in Darvahi Rural District of Shabankareh District. The following census in 2011 counted 97 people in 22 households, by which time the rural district had been separated from the district in the formation of Ab Pakhsh District. Basri was transferred to Dashti-ye Esmail Khani Rural District created in the new district. The 2016 census measured the population of the village as 106 people in 29 households.
