= Cham Tang, Bushehr =

Village in Bushehr province, Iran

Cham Tang Persian: چم تنگ
- Village
- Location within Iran
- Coordinates: 29°17′36″N 50°53′47″E
- Country: Iran
- Province: Bushehr
- County: Dashtestan
- District: Ab Pakhsh
- Rural District: Dashti-ye Esmail Khani

Population (2016)
  - Total: 98
- Time zone: UTC+3:30 (IRST)

Cham Tang (Persian: چم تنگ) (Note: Also romanized as Cham-e Tang; also known as Chamangān and Chamtangān) is a village in Dashti-ye Esmail Khani Rural District of Ab Pakhsh District in Dashtestan County, Bushehr province, Iran.

== Demographics ==
=== Population ===
At the time of the 2006 National Census, the village's population was 95 in 20 households, when it was in Darvahi Rural District of Shabankareh District. The following census in 2011 counted 79 people in 20 households, by which time the rural district had been separated from the district in the formation of Ab Pakhsh District. Cham Tang was transferred to Dashti-ye Esmail Khani Rural District created in the new district. The 2016 census measured the population of the village as 98 people in 27 households.
