= Mokaberi =

Village in Bushehr province, Iran

Mokaberi Persian: مكابري
- Village
- Location within Iran
- Coordinates: 29°17′26″N 50°51′51″E
- Country: Iran
- Province: Bushehr
- County: Dashtestan
- District: Ab Pakhsh
- Rural District: Dashti-ye Esmail Khani

Population (2016)
  - Total: 91
- Time zone: UTC+3:30 (IRST)

Mokaberi (Persian: مكابري) (Note: Also romanized as Makāberī and Mokāberi; also known as Mukābari) is a village in Dashti-ye Esmail Khani Rural District of Ab Pakhsh District in Dashtestan County, Bushehr province, Iran.

== Demographics ==
=== Population ===
At the time of the 2006 National Census, the village's population was 146 in 29 households, when it was in Darvahi Rural District of Shabankareh District. The following census in 2011 counted 91 people in 25 households, by which time the rural district had been separated from the district in the formation of Ab Pakhsh District. Mokaberi was transferred to Dashti-ye Esmail Khani Rural District created in the new district. The 2016 census measured the population of the village as 91 people in 27 households.
