= Bonar-e Soleymani =

Village in Bushehr province, Iran

Bonar-e Soleymani Persian: بنارسليماني
- Village
- Location within Iran
- Coordinates: 29°19′00″N 51°02′29″E
- Country: Iran
- Province: Bushehr
- County: Dashtestan
- District: Ab Pakhsh
- Rural District: Dashti-ye Esmail Khani

Population (2016)
  - Total: 137
- Time zone: UTC+3:30 (IRST)

Bonar-e Soleymani (Persian: بنارسليماني) (Note: Also romanized as Bonār-e Soleymānī; also known as Bonār, Bonār-e Zīārat, and Bunār) is a village in Dashti-ye Esmail Khani Rural District of Ab Pakhsh District in Dashtestan County, Bushehr province, Iran.

== Demographics ==
=== Population ===
At the time of the 2006 National Census, the village's population was 169 in 47 households, when it was in Darvahi Rural District of Shabankareh District. The following census in 2011 counted 115 people in 31 households, by which time the rural district had been separated from the district in the formation of Ab Pakhsh District. Bonar-e Soleymani was transferred to Dashti-ye Esmail Khani Rural District created in the new district. The 2016 census measured the population of the village as 137 people in 46 households.
