= Chehel Gazi, Iran =

Chehel Gazi or Chehl Gazi (Persian: گزي چهل), also rendered as Chehil Gazi, in Iran may refer to:

- Chehel Gazi, Bushehr
- Chehel Gazi alternate name of Chehel Zari-ye Arab, Bushehr Province
- Chehel Gazi, Ilam
- Chehel Gazi, Kurdistan
- Chehil Gazi, Yazd
