= Chehel Zari =

Chehel Zari (Persian: چهل زرعي) may refer to:

- Chehel Zari-ye Ajam, Bushehr Province
- Chehel Zari-ye Arab, Bushehr Province
- Chehel Zari, Ilam
