= Ganaveh Kan =

Village in Bushehr province, Iran

Ganaveh Kan Persian: گناوه كان
- Village
- Location within Iran
- Coordinates: 29°25′32″N 51°08′28″E
- Country: Iran
- Province: Bushehr
- County: Dashtestan
- District: Ab Pakhsh
- Rural District: Darvahi

Population (2016)
  - Total: 42
- Time zone: UTC+3:30 (IRST)

Ganaveh Kan (Persian: گناوه كان) (Note: Also romanized as Ganāveh Kān; also known as Genāvākān, Genāvkān, and Kenāveh Kān) is a village in Darvahi Rural District of Ab Pakhsh District in Dashtestan County, Bushehr province, Iran.

== Demographics ==
=== Population ===
At the time of the 2006 National Census, the village's population was 57 in 11 households, when it was in Shabankareh District. The following census in 2011 counted 41 people in 11 households, by which time the rural district had been separated from the district in the formation of Ab Pakhsh District. The 2016 census measured the population of the village as 42 people in 15 households.
