= Bonar-e Azadegan =

Village in Bushehr province, Iran

Bonar-e Azadegan Persian: بنارآزادگان
- Village
- Location within Iran
- Coordinates: 29°18′07″N 50°59′26″E
- Country: Iran
- Province: Bushehr
- County: Dashtestan
- District: Ab Pakhsh
- Rural District: Darvahi

Population (2016)
  - Total: 616
- Time zone: UTC+3:30 (IRST)

Bonar-e Azadegan (Persian: بنارآزادگان) (Note: Also romanized as Bonār-e Āzādegān; formerly known as Bonar-e Qaed (بنارقائد), also romanized as Bonār-e Qāed) is a village in Darvahi Rural District of Ab Pakhsh District in Dashtestan County, Bushehr province, Iran.

== Demographics ==
=== Population ===
At the time of the 2006 National Census, the village's population was 854 in 163 households, when it was in Shabankareh District. The following census in 2011 counted 743 people in 176 households, by which time the rural district had been separated from the district in the formation of Ab Pakhsh District. The 2016 census measured the population of the village as 616 people in 163 households.
