= Cham Darvahi =

Village in Bushehr province, Iran

Cham Darvahi Persian: چم درواهي
- Village
- Location within Iran
- Coordinates: 29°20′10″N 51°05′37″E
- Country: Iran
- Province: Bushehr
- County: Dashtestan
- District: Ab Pakhsh
- Rural District: Darvahi

Population (2016)
  - Total: 68
- Time zone: UTC+3:30 (IRST)

Cham Darvahi (Persian: چم درواهي) (Note: Also romanized as Cham Darvāhī; also known as Cham Darvāi and Cham Dowrāhī) is a village in, and the capital of, Darvahi Rural District in Ab Pakhsh District of Dashtestan County, Bushehr province, Iran.

== Demographics ==
=== Population ===
At the time of the 2006 National Census, the village's population was 92 in 21 households, when it was in Shabankareh District. The following census in 2011 counted 90 people in 19 households, by which time the rural district had been separated from the district in the formation of Ab Pakhsh District. The 2016 census measured the population of the village as 68 people in 19 households.
