= Dashti-ye Esmail Khani =

Village in Bushehr province, Iran

Dashti-ye Esmail Khani Persian: دشتي اسماعيل خاني
- Village
- Location within Iran
- Coordinates: 29°17′12″N 50°57′37″E
- Country: Iran
- Province: Bushehr
- County: Dashtestan
- District: Ab Pakhsh
- Rural District: Dashti-ye Esmail Khani

Population (2016)
  - Total: 546
- Time zone: UTC+3:30 (IRST)

Dashti-ye Esmail Khani (Persian: دشتي اسماعيل خاني) (Note: Also romanized as Dashtī-ye Esmā‘īl Khānī) is a village in, and the capital of, Dashti-ye Esmail Khani Rural District in Ab Pakhsh District of Dashtestan County, Bushehr province, Iran.

== Demographics ==
=== Population ===
At the time of the 2006 National Census, the village's population was 769 in 172 households, when it was in Darvahi Rural District of Shabankareh District. The following census in 2011 counted 671 people in 158 households, by which time the rural district had been separated from the district in the formation of Ab Pakhsh District. The village was transferred to Dashti-ye Esmail Khani Rural District created in the new district. The 2016 census measured the population of the village as 546 people in 155 households. Dashti-ye Esmail Khani was the most populous village in its rural district.
