= Chahar Borj, Dashtestan =

Village in Bushehr province, Iran

Chahar Borj Persian: چهار برج
- Village
- Location within Iran
- Coordinates: 29°20′30″N 51°03′54″E
- Country: Iran
- Province: Bushehr
- County: Dashtestan
- District: Ab Pakhsh
- Rural District: Darvahi

Population (2016)
  - Total: 1,294
- Time zone: UTC+3:30 (IRST)

Chahar Borj (Persian: چهار برج) (Note: Also romanized as Chahār Borj) is a village in Darvahi Rural District of Ab Pakhsh District in Dashtestan County, Bushehr province, Iran.

== Demographics ==
=== Population ===
At the time of the 2006 National Census, the village's population was 1,253 in 255 households, when it was in Shabankareh District. The following census in 2011 counted 1,088 people in 257 households, by which time the rural district had been separated from the district in the formation of Ab Pakhsh District. The 2016 census measured the population of the village as 1,294 people in 377 households. It was the most populous village in its rural district.
