= Moshfaqabad =

Village in Bushehr province, Iran

Moshfaqabad Persian: مشفق آباد
- Village
- Location within Iran
- Country: Iran
- Province: Bushehr
- County: Dashtestan
- District: Ab Pakhsh
- Rural District: Darvahi

Population (2016)
  - Total: 75
- Time zone: UTC+3:30 (IRST)

Moshfaqabad (Persian: مشفق آباد) is a village in Darvahi Rural District of Ab Pakhsh District in Dashtestan County, Bushehr province, Iran.

== Demographics ==
=== Population ===
The village did not appear in the 2006 and 2011 National Censuses, when it was in Shabankareh District. The 2016 census measured the population of the village as 75 people in 24 households, by which time the rural district had been separated from the district in the formation of Ab Pakhsh District.
