= Mian Dasht, Bushehr =

Village in Bushehr province, Iran

Mian Dasht Persian: ميان دشت
- Village
- Location within Iran
- Coordinates: 29°24′15″N 51°02′32″E
- Country: Iran
- Province: Bushehr
- County: Dashtestan
- District: Ab Pakhsh
- Rural District: Darvahi

Population (2016)
  - Total: 1,116
- Time zone: UTC+3:30 (IRST)

Mian Dasht (Persian: ميان دشت) (Note: Also romanized as Mīān Dasht; also known as Chā Mūshī, Chāh Mūshī (چاه موشي), Chāh Mūshī-ye ‘Olyā, Chāh Mushki, and Chāh-e Moshk) is a village in Darvahi Rural District of Ab Pakhsh District in Dashtestan County, Bushehr province, Iran.

== Demographics ==
=== Population ===
At the time of the 2006 National Census, the village's population was 936 in 182 households, when it was in Shabankareh District. The following census in 2011 counted 1,094 people in 273 households, by which time the rural district had been separated from the district in the formation of Ab Pakhsh District. The 2016 census measured the population of the village as 1,116 people in 333 households.
