= Laypeh =

Village in Bushehr province, Iran

Laypeh Persian: لايپه
- Village
- Location within Iran
- Coordinates: 29°31′55″N 50°55′42″E
- Country: Iran
- Province: Bushehr
- County: Dashtestan
- District: Shabankareh
- Rural District: Shabankareh

Population (2016)
  - Total: 349
- Time zone: UTC+3:30 (IRST)

Laypeh (Persian: لايپه) (Note: Also romanized as Lāypeh and Ley Peh; also known as Lāibeh, Lay Pahneh, Ley Paheh, Leybeh, and Līpaheh) is a village in Shabankareh Rural District of Shabankareh District in Dashtestan County, Bushehr province, Iran.

== Demographics ==
=== Population ===
At the time of the 2006 National Census, the village's population was 358 in 61 households. The following census in 2011 counted 300 people in 71 households. The 2016 census measured the population of the village as 349 people in 94 households.
