= Chah Dul =

Village in Bushehr province, Iran

Chah Dul Persian: چاه دول
- Village
- Location within Iran
- Coordinates: 29°27′34″N 50°57′24″E
- Country: Iran
- Province: Bushehr
- County: Dashtestan
- District: Shabankareh
- Rural District: Shabankareh

Population (2016)
  - Total: 508
- Time zone: UTC+3:30 (IRST)

Chah Dul (Persian: چاه دول) (Note: Also romanized as Chah Dool and Chāh Dūl) is a village in Shabankareh Rural District of Shabankareh District in Dashtestan County, Bushehr province, Iran.

== Demographics ==
=== Population ===
At the time of the 2006 National Census, the village's population was 404 in 76 households. The following census in 2011 counted 473 people in 117 households. The 2016 census measured the population of the village as 508 people in 143 households.
