= Goldasht, Bushehr =

Village in Bushehr province, Iran

Goldasht Persian: گلدشت
- Village
- Location within Iran
- Coordinates: 29°33′06″N 51°05′10″E
- Country: Iran
- Province: Bushehr
- County: Dashtestan
- District: Shabankareh
- Rural District: Shabankareh

Population (2016)
  - Total: 1,126
- Time zone: UTC+3:30 (IRST)

Goldasht (Persian: گلدشت) (Note: Formerly known as Dasht-e Gur (دشت گور), also romanized as Dasht Gūr and Dasht-e Gūr; also known as Dasht-e Kūr and Dasht-i-Kūr) is a village in Shabankareh Rural District of Shabankareh District in Dashtestan County, Bushehr province, Iran.

== Demographics ==
=== Population ===
At the time of the 2006 National Census, the village's population was 1,061 in 209 households. The following census in 2011 counted 1,065 people in 272 households, by which time the village had been renamed Goldasht. The 2016 census measured the population of the village as 1,126 people in 317 households.
