= Khiarzar =

Village in Bushehr province, Iran

Khiarzar Persian: خيارزار
- Village
- Location within Iran
- Coordinates: 29°31′10″N 50°56′53″E
- Country: Iran
- Province: Bushehr
- County: Dashtestan
- District: Shabankareh
- Rural District: Shabankareh

Population (2016)
  - Total: 408
- Time zone: UTC+3:30 (IRST)

Khiarzar (Persian: خيارزار) (Note: Also romanized as Khīār Zār, Khīārzār, and Khīyar Zar; also known as Kheyār Zard) is a village in Shabankareh Rural District of Shabankareh District in Dashtestan County, Bushehr province, Iran.

== Demographics ==
=== Population ===
At the time of the 2006 National Census, the village's population was 375 in 78 households. The following census in 2011 counted 357 people in 92 households. The 2016 census measured the population of the village as 408 people in 113 households.
