= Shah Firuz =

Village in Bushehr province, Iran

Shah Firuz Persian: شاه فيروز
- Village
- Location within Iran
- Coordinates: 29°33′03″N 50°54′20″E
- Country: Iran
- Province: Bushehr
- County: Dashtestan
- District: Shabankareh
- Rural District: Shabankareh

Population (2016)
  - Total: 318
- Time zone: UTC+3:30 (IRST)

Shah Firuz (Persian: شاه فيروز) (Note: Also romanized as Shah Firooz and Shāh Fīrūz) is a village in Shabankareh Rural District of Shabankareh District in Dashtestan County, Bushehr province, Iran.

== Demographics ==
=== Population ===
At the time of the 2006 National Census, the village's population was 254 in 48 households. The following census in 2011 counted 201 people in 49 households. The 2016 census measured the population of the village as 318 people in 86 households.
