= Sholdan va Baghi =

Village in Bushehr province, Iran

Sholdan va Baghi Persian: شلدان و باغي
- Village
- Location within Iran
- Coordinates: 29°34′06″N 50°51′57″E
- Country: Iran
- Province: Bushehr
- County: Dashtestan
- District: Shabankareh
- Rural District: Shabankareh

Population (2016)
  - Total: 57
- Time zone: UTC+3:30 (IRST)

Sholdan va Baghi (Persian: شلدان و باغي) (Note: Also romanized as Shaldan va Baghi and Shaldān va Bāghī; also known as Shaldān, Sholdān, and Sholdūn; formerly the villages of Baghi (باغي) and Sholdan (شلدان)) is a village in Shabankareh Rural District of Shabankareh District in Dashtestan County, Bushehr province, Iran.

== Demographics ==
=== Population ===
At the time of the 2006 National Census, the village's population was 38 in six households. The following census in 2011 counted 36 people in nine households. The 2016 census measured the population of the village as 57 people in 19 households.
