= Dehdaran-e Sofla =

Village in Bushehr province, Iran

Dehdaran-e Sofla Persian: دهداران سفلي
- Village
- Location within Iran
- Coordinates: 29°29′42″N 50°55′41″E
- Country: Iran
- Province: Bushehr
- County: Dashtestan
- District: Shabankareh
- Rural District: Shabankareh

Population (2016)
  - Total: 1,872
- Time zone: UTC+3:30 (IRST)

Dehdaran-e Sofla (Persian: دهداران سفلي) (Note: Also romanized as Dehdaran Sofla and Dehdārān-e Soflá; also known as Dehdārān and Dehdārān-e Pā’īn) is a village in Shabankareh Rural District of Shabankareh District in Dashtestan County, Bushehr province, Iran.

== Demographics ==
=== Population ===
At the time of the 2006 National Census, the village's population was 1,767 in 350 households. The following census in 2011 counted 1,837 people in 440 households. The 2016 census measured the population of the village as 1,872 people in 515 households.
