= Zakariai =

Village in Bushehr province, Iran

Zakariai Persian: ذكريايي
- Village
- Location within Iran
- Coordinates: 29°29′20″N 50°58′23″E
- Country: Iran
- Province: Bushehr
- County: Dashtestan
- District: Shabankareh
- Rural District: Shabankareh

Population (2016)
  - Total: 650
- Time zone: UTC+3:30 (IRST)

Zakariai (Persian: ذكريايي) (Note: Also romanized as Zakarīā’ī, Zakarīyā’ī, and Z̄akaryā’ī; also known as Zakarriya and Z̄akaryā’) is a village in Shabankareh Rural District of Shabankareh District in Dashtestan County, Bushehr province, Iran.

== Demographics ==
=== Population ===
At the time of the 2006 National Census, the village's population was 523 in 126 households. The following census in 2011 counted 490 people in 136 households. The 2016 census measured the population of the village as 650 people in 207 households.
