= Garden sorrel =

Garden sorrel may refer to the following plant species:

- Rumex acetosa, the common sorrel
- Rumex rugosus, the wrinkled sorrel
