= Sarajabad =

Village in Bushehr province, Iran

Sarajabad Persian: سراج اباد
- Village
- Location within Iran
- Coordinates: 29°29′44″N 50°57′55″E
- Country: Iran
- Province: Bushehr
- County: Dashtestan
- District: Shabankareh
- Rural District: Shabankareh

Population (2016)
  - Total: 826
- Time zone: UTC+3:30 (IRST)

Sarajabad (Persian: سراج اباد) (Note: Also romanized as Sarājābād; also known as Sorkhreh (سرخره)) is a village in Shabankareh Rural District of Shabankareh District in Dashtestan County, Bushehr province, Iran.

== Demographics ==
=== Population ===
At the time of the 2006 National Census, the village's population was 702 in 143 households. The following census in 2011 counted 689 people in 175 households. The 2016 census measured the population of the village as 826 people in 206 households.
