= Dehdaran-e Olya =

Village in Bushehr province, Iran

Dehdaran-e Olya Persian: دهداران عليا
- Village
- Location within Iran
- Coordinates: 29°30′27″N 50°55′20″E
- Country: Iran
- Province: Bushehr
- County: Dashtestan
- District: Shabankareh
- Rural District: Shabankareh

Population (2016)
  - Total: 410
- Time zone: UTC+3:30 (IRST)

Dehdaran-e Olya (Persian: دهداران عليا) (Note: Also romanized as Dehdārān ‘Olyā and Dehdārān-e ‘Olya; also known as Dehdārān and Dehdārān-e Bālā) is a village in Shabankareh Rural District of Shabankareh District in Dashtestan County, Bushehr province, Iran.

== Demographics ==
=== Population ===
At the time of the 2006 National Census, the village's population was 285 in 51 households. The following census in 2011 counted 246 people in 61 households. The 2016 census measured the population of the village as 410 people in 112 households.
