= Ateybeh =

Village in Bushehr province, Iran

Ateybeh Persian: عطيبه
- Village
- Location within Iran
- Coordinates: 29°28′57″N 50°53′41″E
- Country: Iran
- Province: Bushehr
- County: Dashtestan
- District: Shabankareh
- Rural District: Shabankareh

Population (2016)
  - Total: 725
- Time zone: UTC+3:30 (IRST)

Ateybeh (Persian: عطيبه) (Note: Also romanized as ‘Aţeybeh and ‘Atībeh; also known as Atiyeh) is a village in Shabankareh Rural District of Shabankareh District in Dashtestan County, Bushehr province, Iran.

== Demographics ==
=== Population ===
At the time of the 2006 National Census, the village's population was 688 in 142 households. The following census in 2011 counted 533 people in 138 households. The 2016 census measured the population of the village as 725 people in 205 households.
