= Samii =

Village in Bushehr province, Iran

Samii Persian: سمیعی
- Village
- Location within Iran
- Coordinates: 29°29′03″N 50°48′19″E
- Country: Iran
- Province: Bushehr
- County: Dashtestan
- District: Shabankareh
- Rural District: Shabankareh

Population (2016)
  - Total: 275
- Time zone: UTC+3:30 (IRST)

Samii (Persian: سمیعی) (Note: Also romanized as Samī‘ī; also known as Samī‘ā and Samīyeh) is a village in Shabankareh Rural District of Shabankareh District in Dashtestan County, Bushehr province, Iran.

== Demographics ==
=== Population ===
At the time of the 2006 National Census, the village's population was 276 in 49 households. The following census in 2011 counted 266 people in 62 households. The 2016 census measured the population of the village as 275 people in 84 households.

As of 2017, about 80% of its residents were Arabic speakers.
