= Mohammad Jamali =

Village in Bushehr province, Iran

Mohammad Jamali Persian: محمدجمالي
- Village
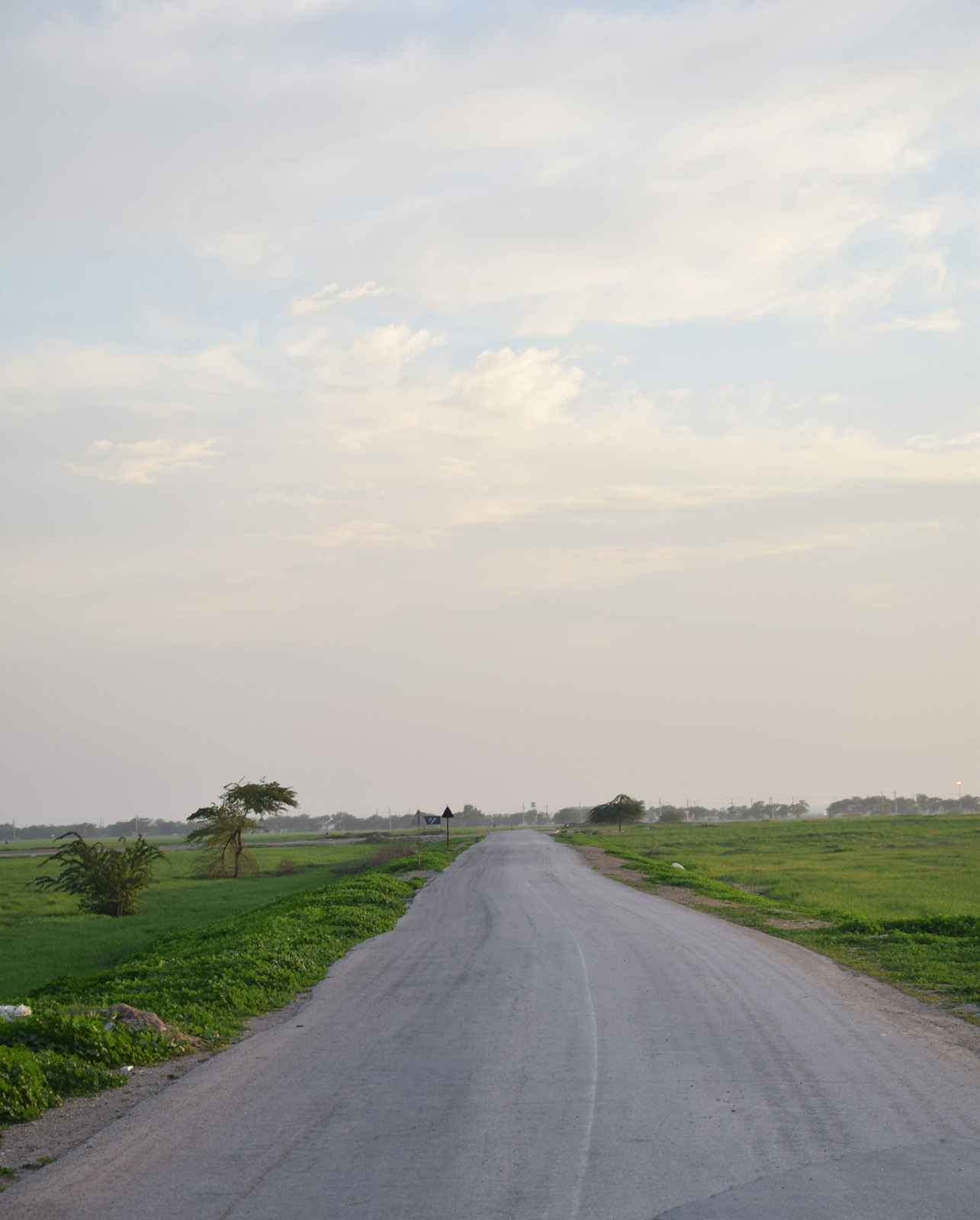

- Location within Iran
- Coordinates: 29°30′28″N 50°57′07″E
- Country: Iran
- Province: Bushehr
- County: Dashtestan
- District: Shabankareh
- Rural District: Shabankareh

Population (2016)
  - Total: 827
- Time zone: UTC+3:30 (IRST)

Mohammad Jamali (Persian: محمدجمالي) (Note: Also romanized as Moḩammad Jamālī and Muhammad Jamāli) is a village in Shabankareh Rural District of Shabankareh District in Dashtestan County, Bushehr province, Iran.

== Demographics ==
=== Population ===
At the time of the 2006 National Census, the village's population was 781 in 171 households. The following census in 2011 counted 699 people in 185 households. The 2016 census measured the population of the village as 827 people in 245 households.
