= Dashti-ye Esmail Khani Rural District =

Rural district in Bushehr province, Iran

Dashti-ye Esmail Khani Rural District Persian: دهستان دشتي اسماعيل خاني
- Rural District
- Location within Iran
- Coordinates: 29°21′N 50°54′E
- Country: Iran
- Province: Bushehr
- County: Dashtestan
- District: Ab Pakhsh
- Established: 2009
- Capital: Dashti-ye Esmail Khani

Population (2016)
  - Total: 1,008
- Time zone: UTC+3:30 (IRST)

Dashti-ye Esmail Khani Rural District (Persian: دهستان دشتي اسماعيل خاني) is in Ab Pakhsh District of Dashtestan County, Bushehr province, Iran. Its capital is the village of Dashti-ye Esmail Khani.

== History ==
In 2009, Darvahi Rural District and the city of Ab Pakhsh were separated from Shabankareh District in the formation of Ab Pakhsh District, and Dashti-ye Esmail Khani Rural District was created in the new district.

== Demographics ==
=== Population ===
At the time of the 2011 census, the rural district's population was 1,058 inhabitants in 257 households. The 2016 census measured the population of the rural district as 1,008 in 297 households. The most populous of its nine villages was Dashti-ye Esmail Khani, with 546 people.

=== Other villages in the rural district ===
- Basri
- Bonar-e Soleymani
- Cham Tang
- Mokaberi
