= Khalifehi, Bushehr =

Village in Bushehr province, Iran

Khalifehi Persian: خليفه اي
- Village
- Location within Iran
- Coordinates: 29°32′12″N 50°51′27″E
- Country: Iran
- Province: Bushehr
- County: Dashtestan
- District: Shabankareh
- Rural District: Shabankareh

Population (2016)
  - Total: 1,976
- Time zone: UTC+3:30 (IRST)

Khalifehi (Persian: خليفه اي) (Note: Also romanized as Khalīfeh’ī; also known as Deh Khalīfeh, Deh-e-Khalīfeh, Deh-i-Khalifeh, and Khalīfeh) is a village in Shabankareh Rural District of Shabankareh District in Dashtestan County, Bushehr province, Iran.

== Demographics ==
=== Population ===
At the time of the 2006 National Census, the village's population was 1,225 in 258 households. The following census in 2011 counted 1,577 people in 373 households. The 2016 census measured the population of the village as 1,976 people in 547 households. It was the most populous village in its rural district.
