= Bohr, Bushehr =

Village in Bushehr province, Iran

Bohr Persian: بهر
- Village
- Location within Iran
- Coordinates: 29°31′21″N 50°53′58″E
- Country: Iran
- Province: Bushehr
- County: Dashtestan
- District: Shabankareh
- Rural District: Shabankareh

Population (2016)
  - Total: 430
- Time zone: UTC+3:30 (IRST)

Bohr (Persian: بهر) (Note: Also known as Bār) is a village in Shabankareh Rural District of Shabankareh District in Dashtestan County, Bushehr province, Iran.

== Demographics ==
=== Population ===
At the time of the 2006 National Census, the village's population was 278 in 55 households. The following census in 2011 counted 269 people in 66 households. The 2016 census measured the population of the village as 430 people in 111 households.
