= Boneh-ye Mohammad =

Village in Bushehr province, Iran

Boneh-ye Mohammad Persian: بنه محمد
- Village
- Location within Iran
- Coordinates: 29°31′22″N 51°08′27″E
- Country: Iran
- Province: Bushehr
- County: Dashtestan
- District: Shabankareh
- Rural District: Shabankareh

Population (2016)
  - Total: 65
- Time zone: UTC+3:30 (IRST)

Boneh-ye Mohammad (Persian: بنه محمد) (Note: Also romanized as Boneh-ye Moḩammad; also known as Bunneh-i-Muhammad) is a village in Shabankareh Rural District of Shabankareh District in Dashtestan County, Bushehr province, Iran.

== Demographics ==
=== Population ===
At the time of the 2006 National Census, the village's population was 49 in 13 households. The following census in 2011 counted 46 people in 15 households. The 2016 census measured the population of the village as 65 people in 20 households.
