= Chah Zangi =

Chah Zangi (Persian: چاه زنگي) may refer to:

- Chah Zangi, Bushehr
- Chah Zangi, Kerman
