= Boveyri, Bushehr =

Village in Bushehr province, Iran

Boveyri Persian: بويري
- Village
- Location within Iran
- Coordinates: 29°25′37″N 51°02′33″E
- Country: Iran
- Province: Bushehr
- County: Dashtestan
- District: Shabankareh
- Rural District: Shabankareh

Population (2016)
  - Total: 1,452
- Time zone: UTC+3:30 (IRST)

Boveyri (Persian: بويري) (Note: Also romanized as Boveyrī and Buvairi; also known as Boveyrī-ye Bālā and Boveyrī-ye ‘Olyā) is a village in Shabankareh Rural District of Shabankareh District in Dashtestan County, Bushehr province, Iran.

== Demographics ==
=== Population ===
At the time of the 2006 National Census, the village's population was 1,515 in 328 households. The following census in 2011 counted 1,479 people in 363 households. The 2016 census measured the population of the village as 1,452 people in 413 households.
