= Boneh-ye Abbas, Bushehr =

Village in Bushehr province, Iran

Boneh-ye Abbas Persian: بنه عباس
- Village
- Location within Iran
- Coordinates: 29°28′30″N 51°08′38″E
- Country: Iran
- Province: Bushehr
- County: Dashtestan
- District: Shabankareh
- Rural District: Shabankareh

Population (2016)
  - Total: 100
- Time zone: UTC+3:30 (IRST)

Boneh-ye Abbas (Persian: بنه عباس) (Note: Also romanized as Boneh-ye ‘Abbās; also known as Boneh-ye ‘Abbāsī) is a village in Shabankareh Rural District of Shabankareh District in Dashtestan County, Bushehr province, Iran.

== Demographics ==
=== Population ===
At the time of the 2006 National Census, the village's population was 103 in 20 households. The following census in 2011 counted 81 people in 19 households. The 2016 census measured the population of the village as 100 people in 30 households.
