= Palangi, Dashtestan =

Village in Bushehr province, Iran

Palangi Persian: پلنگي
- Village
- Location within Iran
- Coordinates: 29°32′34″N 51°08′15″E
- Country: Iran
- Province: Bushehr
- County: Dashtestan
- District: Shabankareh
- Rural District: Shabankareh

Population (2016)
  - Total: 579
- Time zone: UTC+3:30 (IRST)

Palangi (Persian: پلنگي) (Note: Also romanized as Palangī) is a village in Shabankareh Rural District of Shabankareh District in Dashtestan County, Bushehr province, Iran.

== Demographics ==
=== Population ===
At the time of the 2006 National Census, the village's population was 573 in 100 households. The following census in 2011 counted 578 people in 124 households. The 2016 census measured the population of the village as 579 people in 152 households.
