= Milak, Dashtestan =

Village in Bushehr province, Iran

Milak Persian: ميلك
- Village
- Location within Iran
- Coordinates: 29°34′36″N 51°07′25″E
- Country: Iran
- Province: Bushehr
- County: Dashtestan
- District: Shabankareh
- Rural District: Shabankareh

Population (2016)
  - Total: 454
- Time zone: UTC+3:30 (IRST)

Milak (Persian: ميلك) (Note: Also romanized as Mīlak; also known as Lilak) is a village in Shabankareh Rural District of Shabankareh District in Dashtestan County, Bushehr province, Iran.

== Demographics ==
=== Population ===
At the time of the 2006 National Census, the village's population was 210 in 38 households. The following census in 2011 counted 228 people in 63 households. The 2016 census measured the population of the village as 454 people in 129 households.
