= Dasht Tehsil =

Dasht Tehsil may refer to:

- Dasht Tehsil (Kech District)
- Dasht Tehsil (Mastung District)

== See also ==
- Dasht (disambiguation)
