= Lilak =

Lilak may refer to:

- Újpest FC
- Lilak, Dastestan, Bushehr Province, Iran
- Lilak, Tangestan, Bushehr Province, Iran

== See also ==
- Lilac
