= Chah Zangi, Bushehr =

Village in Bushehr province, Iran

Chah Zangi Persian: چاه زنگي
- Village
- Location within Iran
- Coordinates: 29°29′46″N 50°53′11″E
- Country: Iran
- Province: Bushehr
- County: Dashtestan
- District: Shabankareh
- Rural District: Shabankareh

Population (2016)
  - Total: 19
- Time zone: UTC+3:30 (IRST)

Chah Zangi (Persian: چاه زنگي) (Note: Also romanized as Chāh Zangī) is a village in Shabankareh Rural District of Shabankareh District in Dashtestan County, Bushehr province, Iran.

== Demographics ==
=== Population ===
At the time of the 2006 National Census, the village's population was 16 in four households. The following census in 2011 counted 15 people in four households. The 2016 census measured the population of the village as 19 people in five households.
