= Shabankareh Rural District =

Rural district in Bushehr province, Iran

Shabankareh Rural District Persian: دهستان شبانكاره
- Rural District
- Location within Iran
- Coordinates: 29°36′N 50°58′E
- Country: Iran
- Province: Bushehr
- County: Dashtestan
- District: Shabankareh
- Established: 1987
- Capital: Shabankareh

Population (2016)
  - Total: 14,448
- Time zone: UTC+3:30 (IRST)

Shabankareh Rural District (Persian: دهستان شبانكاره) is in Shabankareh District of Dashtestan County, Bushehr province, Iran. It is administered from the city of Shabankareh. (Note: Formerly Deh-e Kohneh)

== Demographics ==
=== Population ===
At the time of the 2006 National Census, the rural district's population was 12,391 in 2,518 households. There were 12,369 inhabitants in 3,064 households at the following census of 2011. The 2016 census measured the population of the rural district as 14,448 in 4,041 households. The most populous of its 31 villages was Khalifehi, with 1,976 people.

=== Other villages in the rural district ===
- Ateybeh
- Bohr
- Boneh-ye Abbas
- Boneh-ye Hajj Nemat
- Boneh-ye Mohammad
- Boveyri
- Chah Dul
- Chah Zangi
- Chehel Zari-ye Ajam
- Chehel Zari-ye Arab
- Dehdaran-e Olya
- Dehdaran-e Sofla
- Goldasht
- Khiarzar
- Laypeh
- Milak
- Mohammad Jamali
- Palangi
- Samii
- Sarajabad
- Shah Firuz
- Sholdan va Baghi
- Zakariai
