= Shabankareh =

City in Bushehr province, Iran

Shabankareh Persian: شبانكاره
- City
- Location within Iran
- Coordinates: 29°28′11″N 50°59′38″E
- Country: Iran
- Province: Bushehr
- County: Dashtestan
- District: Shabankareh

Population (2016)
  - Total: 7,900
- Time zone: UTC+3:30 (IRST)

Shabankareh (Persian: شبانكاره) (Note: Also romanized as Shabānkāreh; formerly Deh-e Kohneh (ده كهنه)) is a city in, and the capital of Shabankareh District in Dashtestan County, Bushehr province, Iran. It also serves as the administrative center for Shabankareh Rural District. The record high temperature of 52.8 °C (127.0 °F) was registered on 19 July 2025 in Shabankareh.

== Demographics ==
=== Population ===
At the time of the 2006 National Census, the city's population was 6,975 in 1,459 households. The following census in 2011 counted 7,653 people in 1,940 households. The 2016 census measured the population of the city as 7,900 people in 2,253 households.
