= Chehel Zari-ye Arab =

Village in Bushehr province, Iran

Chehel Zari-ye Arab Persian: چهل زرعي عرب
- Village
- Location within Iran
- Coordinates: 29°27′32″N 50°52′01″E
- Country: Iran
- Province: Bushehr
- County: Dashtestan
- District: Shabankareh
- Rural District: Shabankareh

Population (2016)
  - Total: 469
- Time zone: UTC+3:30 (IRST)

Chehel Zari-ye Arab (Persian: چهل زرعي عرب) (Note: Also romanized as Chehel Zar‘ī 'Arab and Chehel Zar‘ī-ye 'Arab; also known as Chehil Gazi and Zar‘ī-ye 'Arab) is a village in Shabankareh Rural District of Shabankareh District in Dashtestan County, Bushehr province, Iran.

== Demographics ==
=== Population ===
At the time of the 2006 National Census, the village's population was 331 in 61 households. The following census in 2011 counted 371 people in 91 households. The 2016 census measured the population of the village as 469 people in 125 households.
