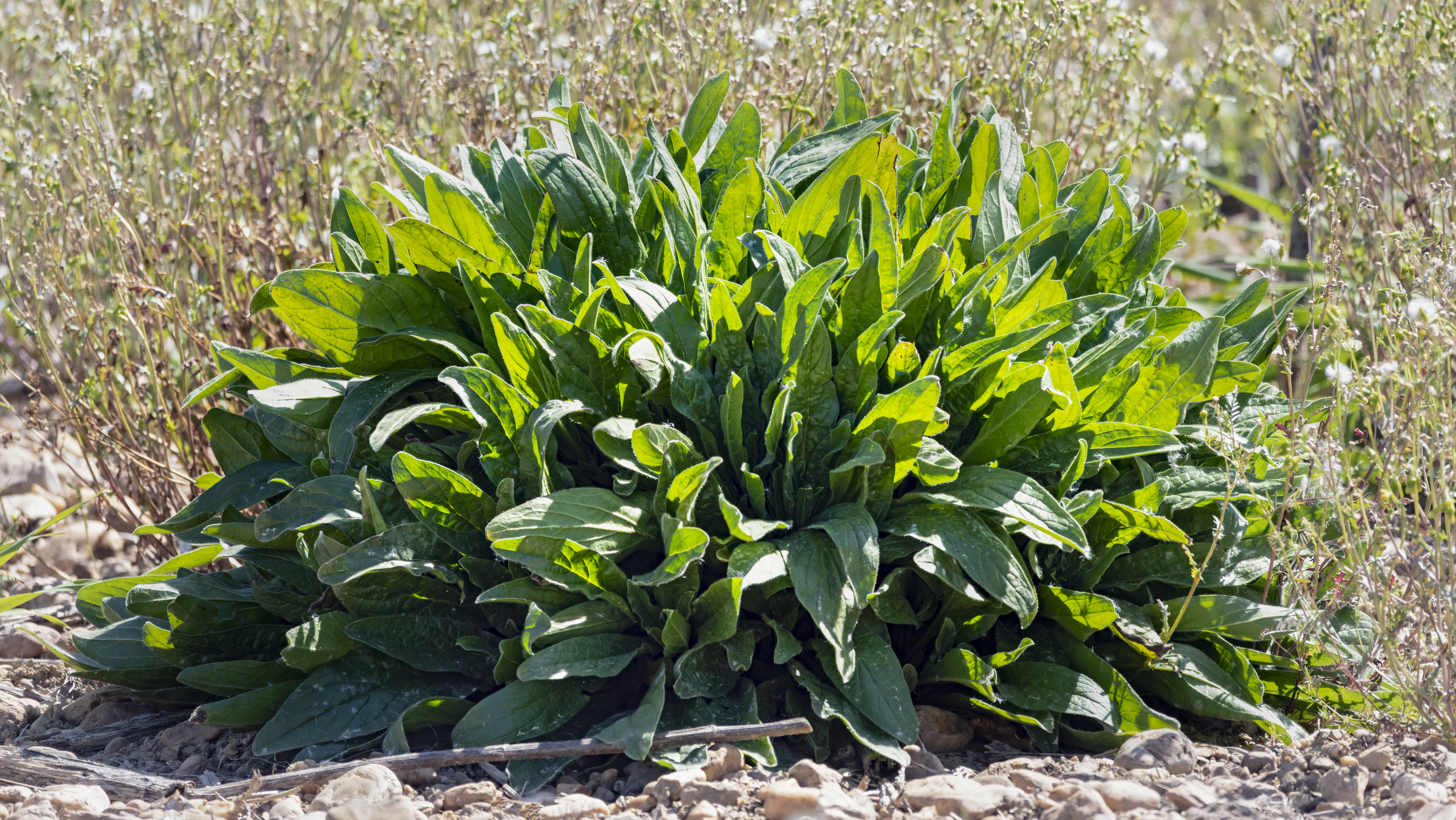
- Plant habit, Muséum de Toulouse

Scientific classification
- Kingdom: Plantae
- Clade: Tracheophytes
- Clade: Angiosperms
- Clade: Eudicots
- Order: Caryophyllales
- Family: Polygonaceae
- Genus: Rumex
- Species: R. acetosa

Binomial name
- Rumex acetosa L.

Synonyms
- Acetosa agrestis Raf.; Acetosa amplexicaulis Raf.; Acetosa angustata Raf.; Acetosa bidentula Raf.; Acetosa fontanopaludosa (Kalela) Holub; Acetosa hastifolia Schur; Acetosa hastulata Raf.; Acetosa magna Gilib.; Acetosa officinalis Gueldenst. ex Ledeb.; Acetosa olitoria Raf.; Acetosa pratensis Garsault nom. inval.; Acetosa pratensis Mill.; Acetosa subalpina Schur; Rumex biformis Lange; Rumex fontanopaludosus Kalela

= Sorrel =

Species of flowering plant

Sorrel (Rumex acetosa) is a perennial herbaceous plant in the family Polygonaceae. It is also called common sorrel, meadow sorrel, green sorrel, sour dock, spinach dock and narrow-leaved dock ("dock" often used for the genus).

The species is native to Eurasia and a common wild plant in grassland habitats. It is often consumed as a leaf vegetable or herb, and has a cultigen, called Rumex rugosus and garden sorrel, that is typically the taxon found in gardens and sold by commercial suppliers.

== Description ==
Sorrel is a slender herbaceous perennial plant about 60 centimetres (24 inches) high, with roots that run deep into the ground, as well as juicy stems and arrow-shaped (sagittate) leaves which grow from a rosette. The lower leaves are 7 to 15 cm (3 to 6 in) in length with long petioles and a membranous ocrea formed of fused, sheathing stipules. The upper leaves are sessile, (growing directly from the stem without a petiole) and frequently become crimson.

The plant has whorled spikes of reddish-green flowers, which bloom in early summer, becoming purplish. The species is dioecious, with stamens and pistils on different plants.

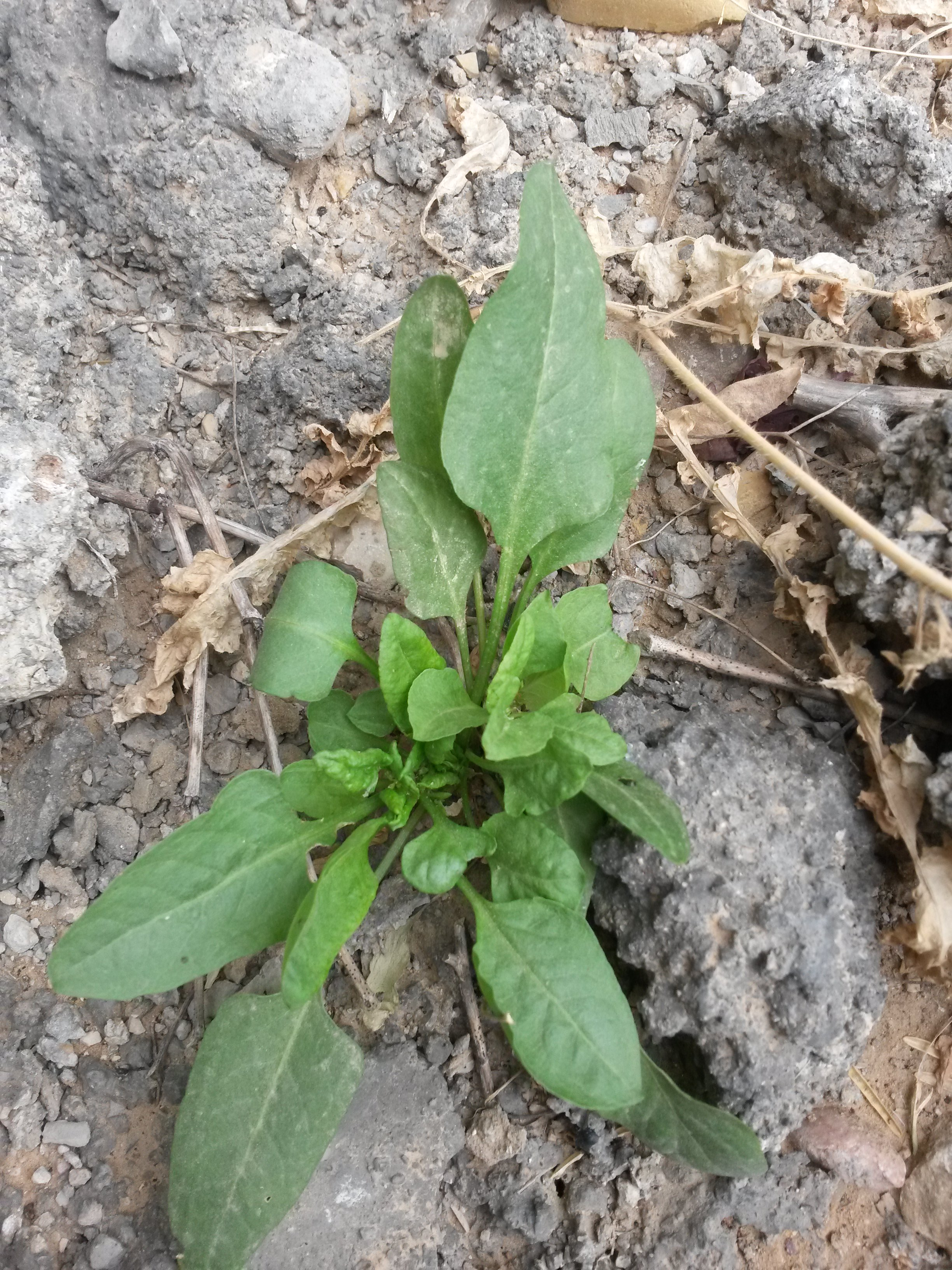
Sorrel plant in Ab Pakhsh

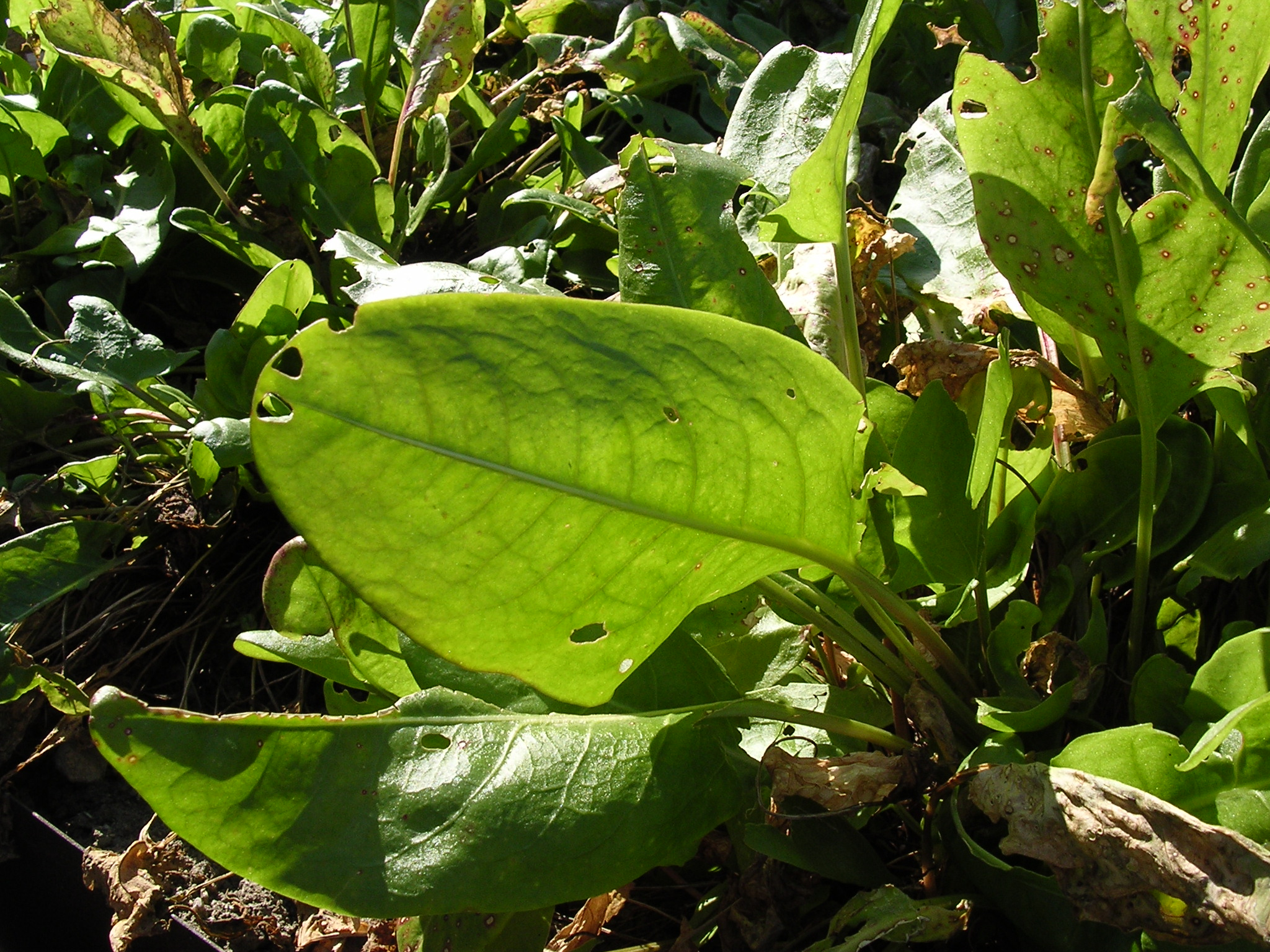
Leaves

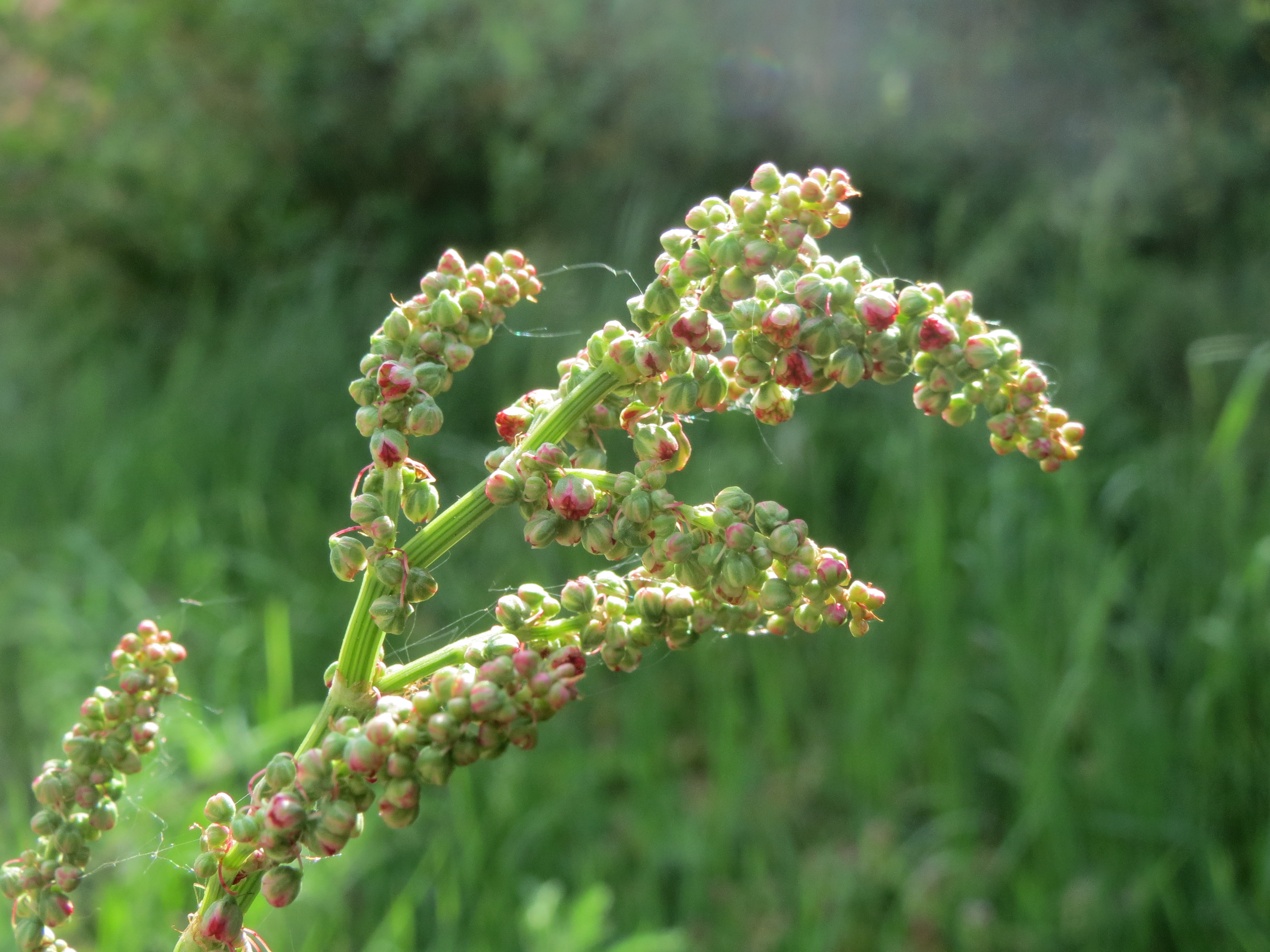
Buds

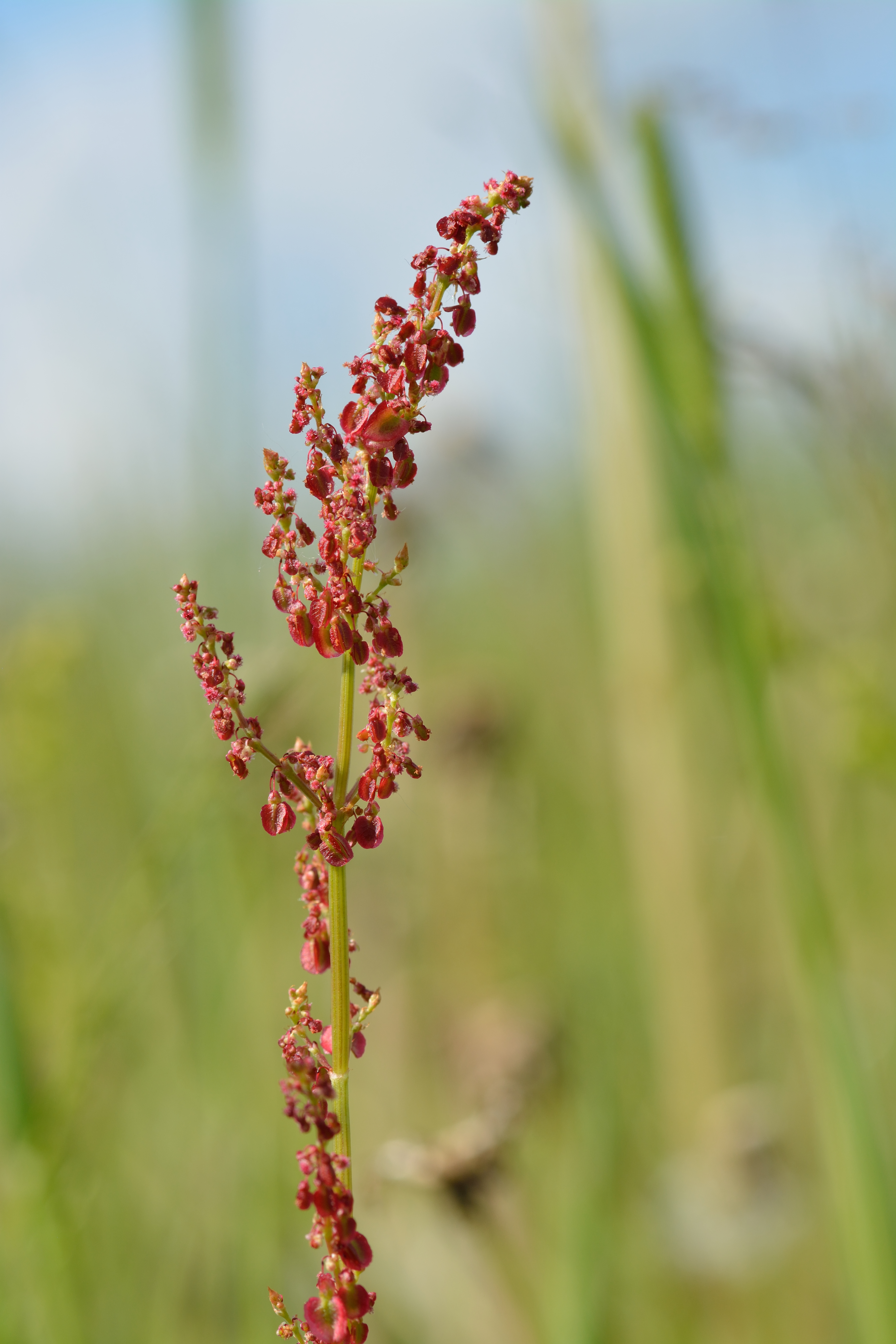
Flowers

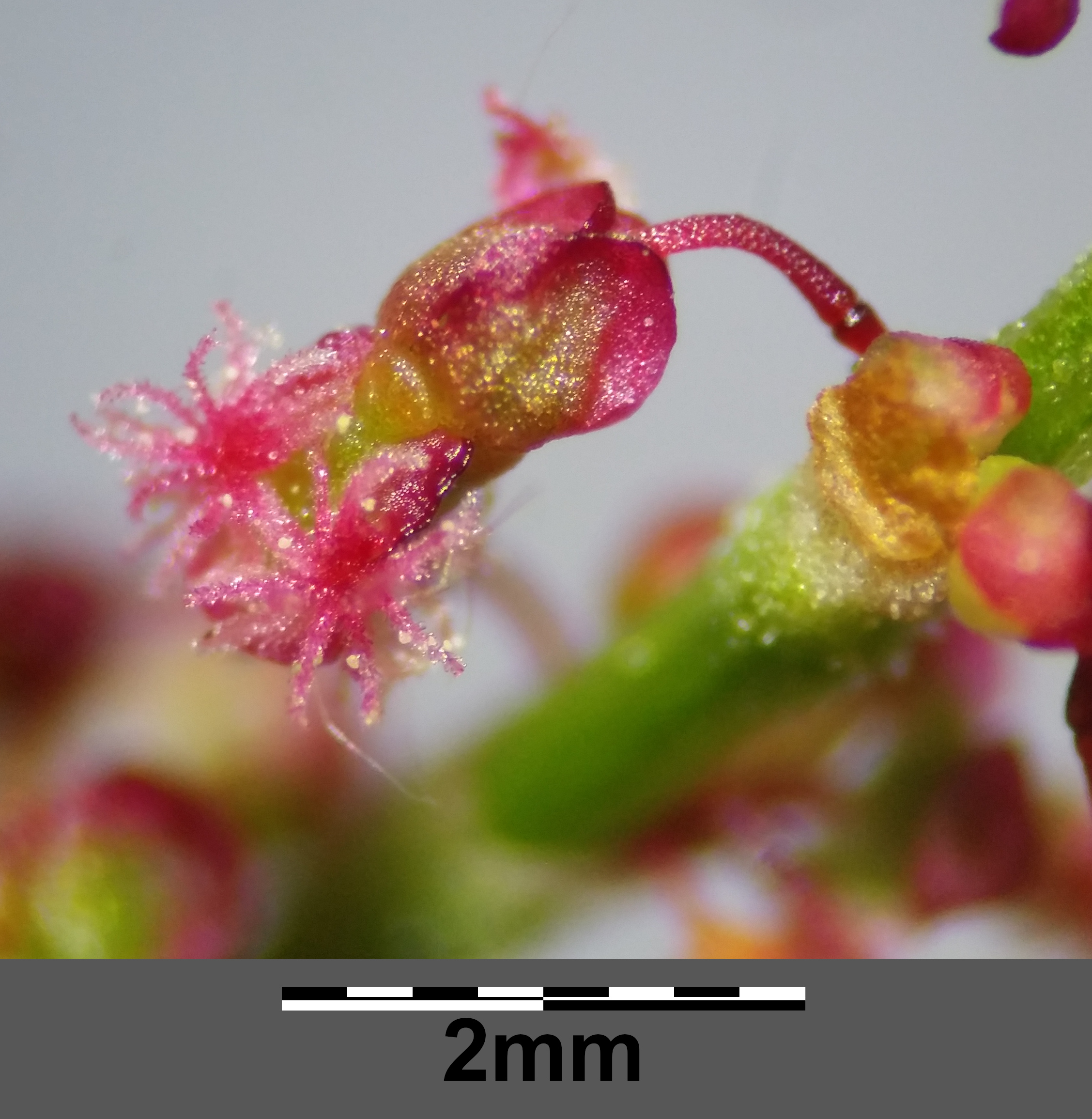
Close-up of subsp. acetosa flowers

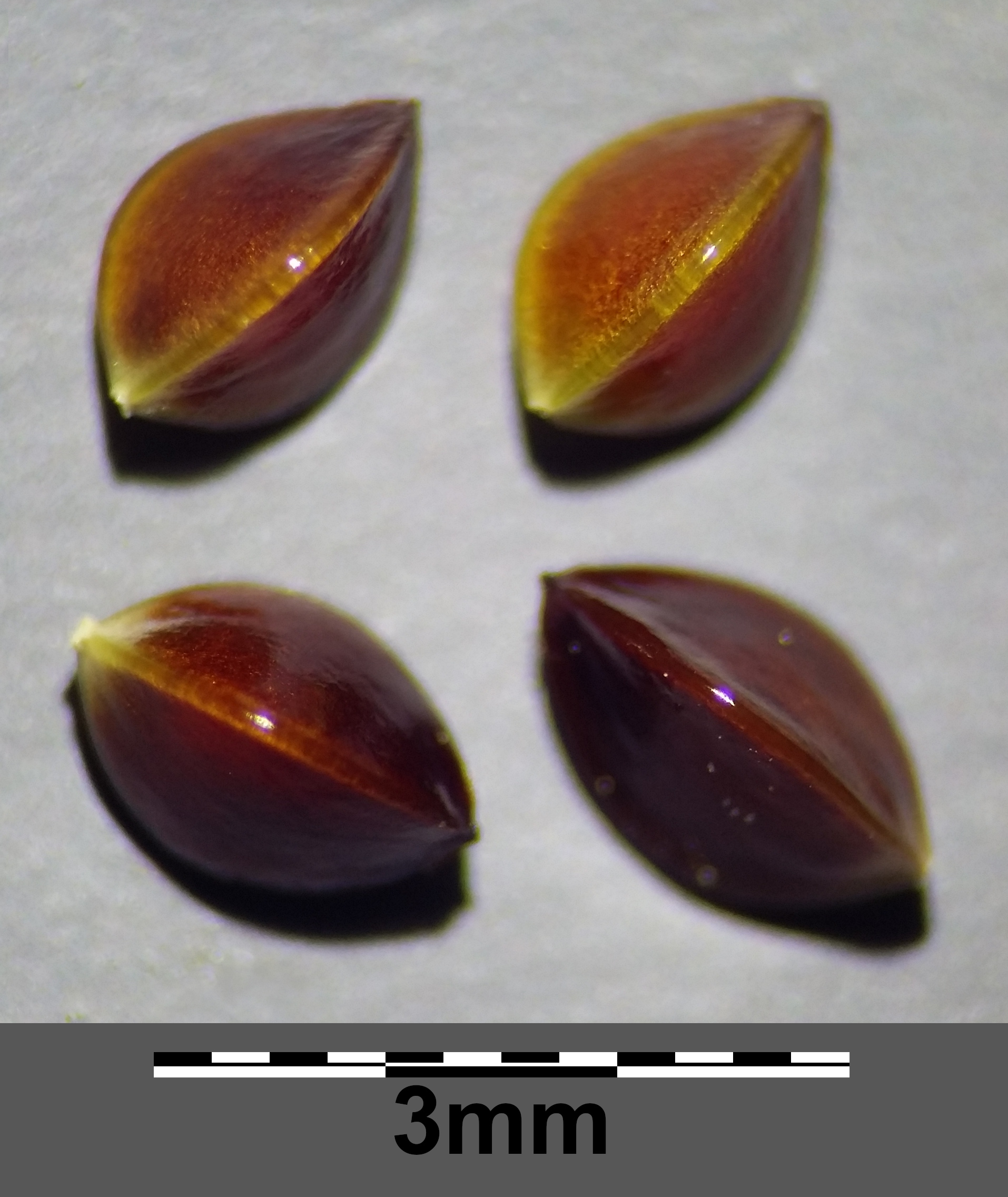
Close-up of subsp. acetosa nuts

== Subspecies ==
Several subspecies have been named. Not all are cultivated.

- Rumex acetosa subsp. acetosa
- Rumex acetosa subsp. ambiguus
- Rumex acetosa subsp. arifolius
- Rumex acetosa subsp. hibernicus
- Rumex acetosa subsp. hirtulus
- Rumex acetosa subsp. vinealis

== Distribution and habitat ==
Rumex acetosa occurs in grassland habitats throughout Europe from the northern Mediterranean coast to the north of Scandinavia and in parts of Central Asia. It occurs as an introduced species in parts of New Zealand, Australia, and North America. It can grow in poor soil.

== Ecology ==
The leaves are eaten by the larvae of several species of Lepidoptera (butterfly and moth) including the blood-vein moth, aphids and by non-specialized snails and slugs.

== Uses ==
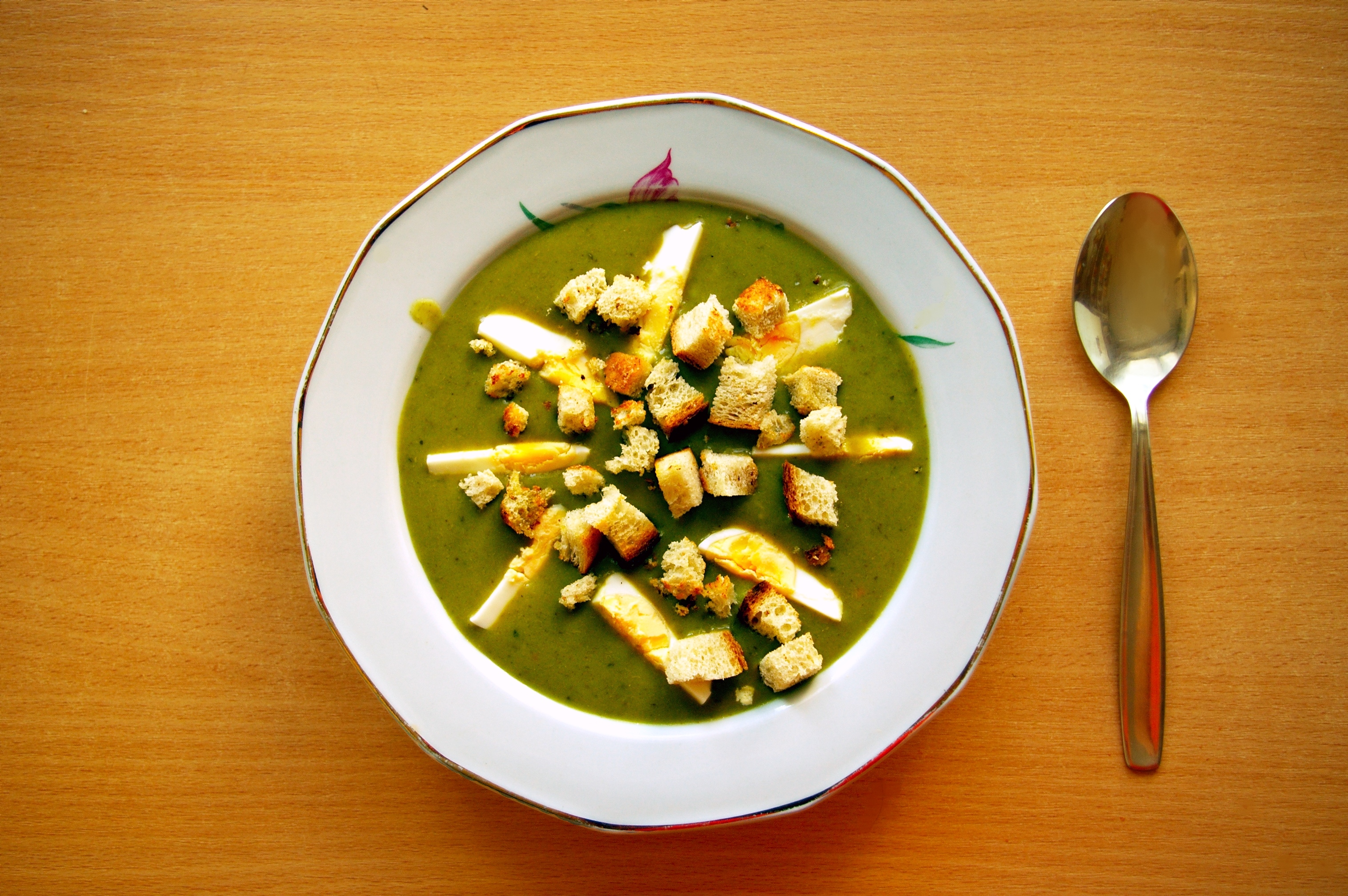
Sorrel soup with egg and croutons, part of Polish cuisine

Common sorrel has been cultivated for centuries. The leaves are edible when young but toughen with age; they may be puréed in soups and sauces or added to salad. The young shoots are edible as well, these and the leaves both being high in vitamin C and having a lemony flavor.

In India, the leaves are used in soups or curries made with yellow lentils and peanuts. In Afghanistan, the leaves are coated in a wet batter and deep fried, then served as an appetizer or, when in season during Ramadan, to break the fast. In Armenia, the leaves are collected in spring, woven into braids, and dried for use during winter. The most common preparation is aveluk soup, where the leaves are rehydrated and rinsed to reduce bitterness, then stewed with onions, potatoes, walnuts, garlic and bulgur wheat or lentils, and sometimes sour plums.

Throughout eastern Europe, wild or garden sorrel is used to make sour soups, stewed with vegetables, herbs, meat or eggs. In rural Greece, it is used with spinach, leeks, and chard in spanakopita.

"Escalope de saumon à l'oseille" (salmon escalope in sorrel sauce), invented in 1962 by the Troisgros brothers, is an emblematic dish of French nouvelle cuisine. French cuisine traditionally cooks fish with sorrel because its acidity dissolves thin fish bone bones.

In the Caribbean, the term "sorrel" refers to a type of sweet hibiscus tea commonly made from the African roselle flower, unrelated to the Eurasian sorrel herb.

== See also ==
- Wood sorrel (Oxalis), an unrelated genus
