= Chehel Zari-ye Ajam =

Village in Bushehr province, Iran

Chehel Zari-ye Ajam Persian: چهل زرعي عجم
- Village
- Location within Iran
- Coordinates: 29°29′09″N 50°51′21″E
- Country: Iran
- Province: Bushehr
- County: Dashtestan
- District: Shabankareh
- Rural District: Shabankareh

Population (2016)
  - Total: 476
- Time zone: UTC+3:30 (IRST)

Chehel Zari-ye Ajam (Persian: چهل زرعي عجم) (Note: Also romanized as Chehel Zar‘ī 'Ajam and Chehel Zar‘ī-ye 'Ajam; also known as 'Ajam and Chehil Gazi) is a village in Shabankareh Rural District of Shabankareh District in Dashtestan County, Bushehr province, Iran.

== Demographics ==
=== Population ===
At the time of the 2006 National Census, the village's population was 513 in 117 households. The following census in 2011 counted 480 people in 127 households. The 2016 census measured the population of the village as 476 people in 144 households.
