= Yossi Dashti =

Israeli-American author, researcher and business facilitator

- יוסי דשתי
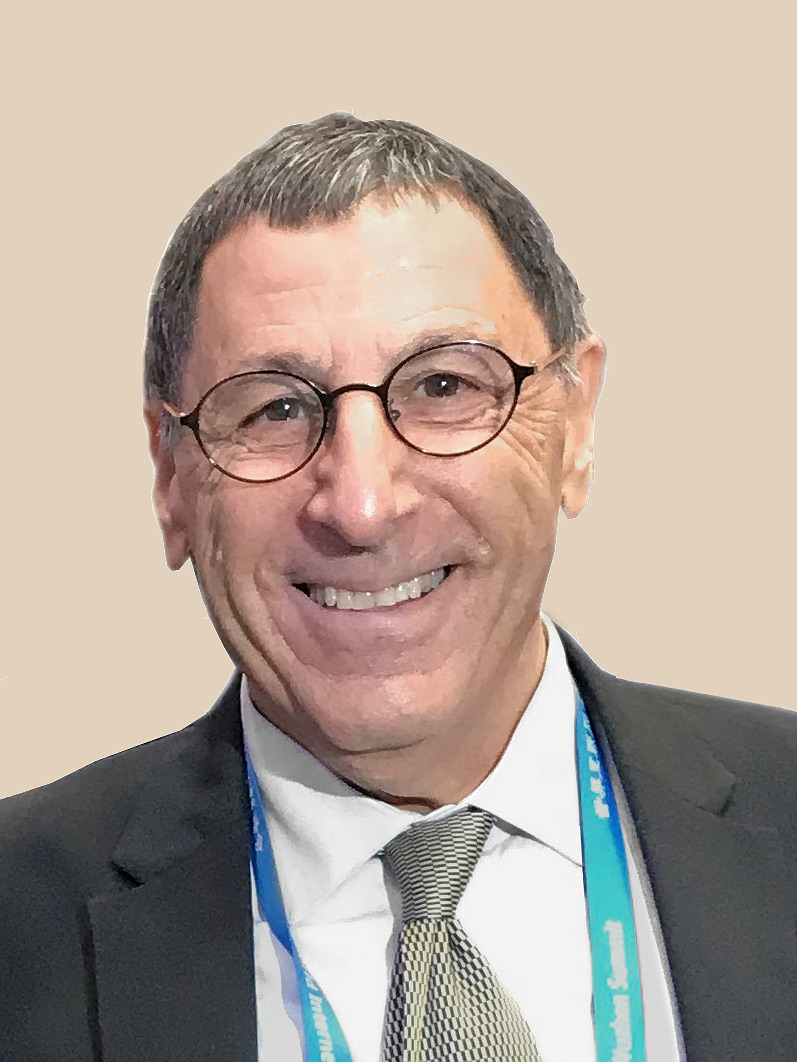
- Born: 1952 (age 73–74)
- Education: University of San Francisco (B.Sc.), University of California, Irvine (MBA)
- Occupations: Author, researcher, and business facilitator

Yossi Dashti (Hebrew: יוסי דשתי; born in 1952) is an Israeli–American author, researcher, and business facilitator, in the field of computer information systems, innovation and entrepreneurship. In his books and publications, he promotes value creation and process improvements, while integrating academic research and practical technology innovation business experience. In his early career, Dashti was engaged with Information Technology (IT) and software applications and was among the pioneers in the development of Electronic Data Interchange (EDI) and E-Commerce platforms.

Since 2008, he has been actively promoting China-Israel collaboration in academia and industry, teaching in several universities and setting technology transfer in the two countries. His engagements and contribution to the China Israel relationship are presented and exemplified in his book titled “Jewish Principals, Innovation and Entrepreneurship – China-Israel Collaboration Opportunities”. Dashti has also been involved in social activities, mainly in the field of education, serving as a board member of several associations.

== Academia ==
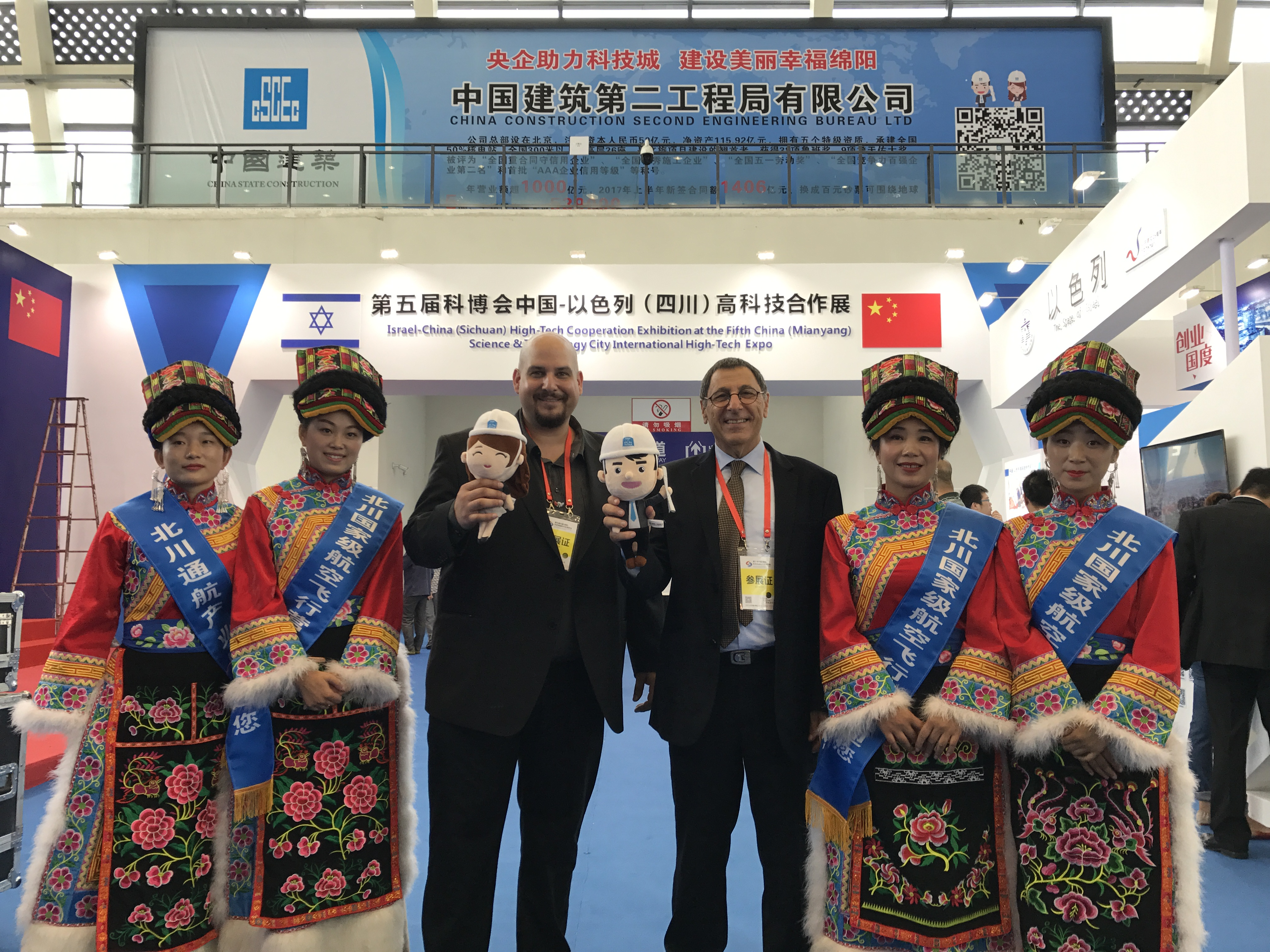
Dr. Dashti in Israel-China High-Tech Cooporetion Excebition

Dashti holds a B.Sc. in computer systems from the University of San Francisco, and an MBA with an emphasis on Information Technologies (IT) and international marketing from the University of California at Irvine. In 2001, he began his doctoral research at the California Graduate Institute. In 2005, he moved to the Faculty of Management at Ben-Gurion University of the Negev, Israel, where he completed a research, focusing on the success factors of technology startup companies. In his doctoral dissertation, "Alliances and the Success of Technological Ventures", he examined the factors that contributed to the successful exit of startup companies that were acquired in Mergers and Acquisitions transactions.

Dashti's academic work focuses on the ways to create economic value in an innovative entrepreneurial environment. Among the topics of his research are regional ecosystems' development through innovation hubs, success factors of high-tech ventures, mergers and acquisitions among technology companies, exit strategy of start-up companies, process improvement of the supply chain through the implementation of electronic commerce, and leveraging business support networks to improve the firm's performance. In addition, he is teaching innovation, entrepreneurship, and strategy for graduate students at the Technion is Haifa and in entrepreneurship and innovation programs at Peking University and Renmin University of China in Beijing, and Sichuan University in Chengdu.

== Industry ==
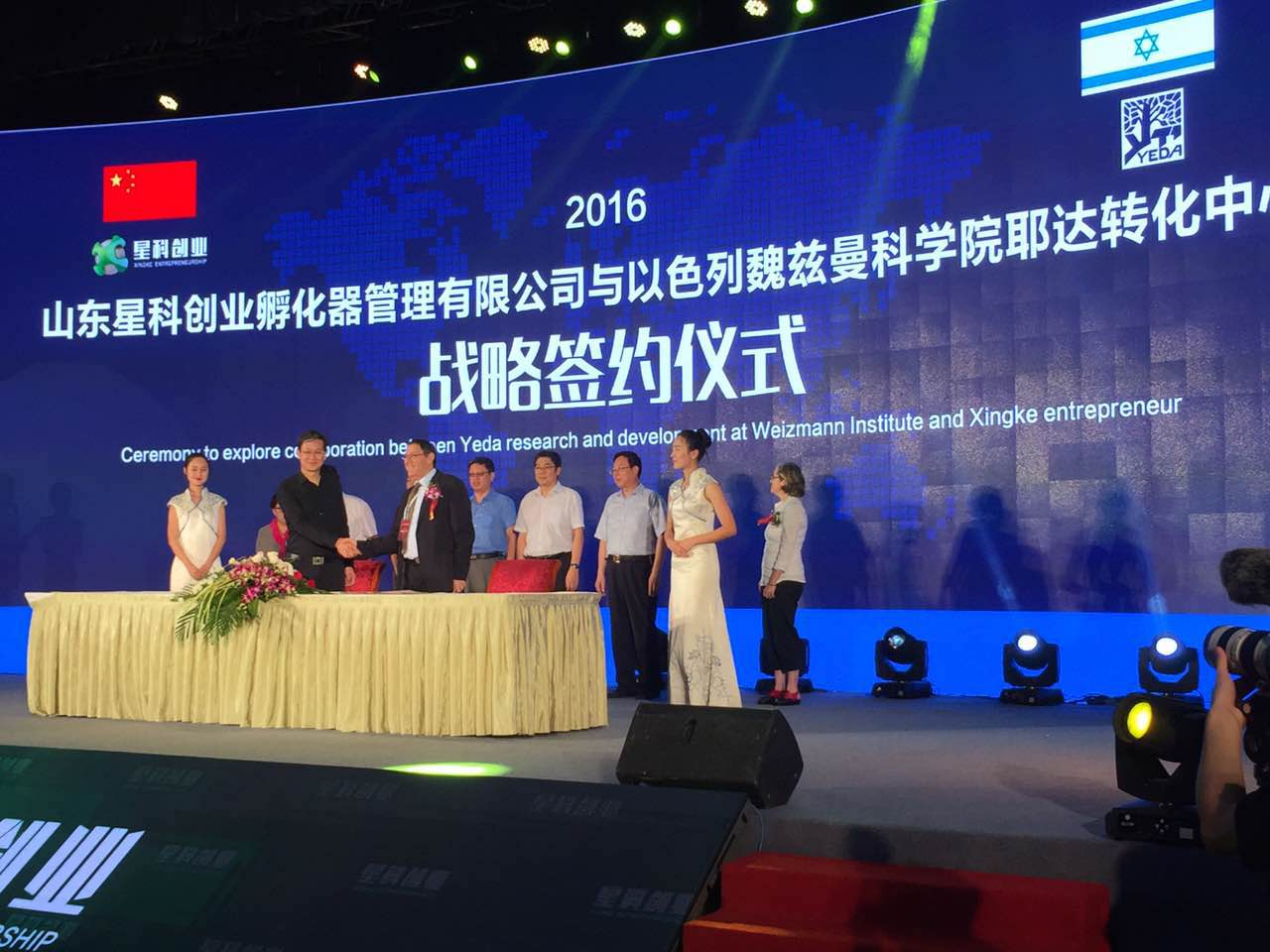
Dr. Dashti in the ceremony to explore Cooperation between YEDA and Xingke

Dashti began his professional career at Tel Aviv University where he administrated the operation of computers at the computing center of the Recanati School of Management and instructed computer programming languages at the Lahav management development program. In 1983, he joined the Israeli subsidiary of the American computer company Digital Equipment Corporation (DEC) and in 1985 he moved to the company's headquarters in California. At DEC, he pioneered the development and implementation of the EDI program that set the platform for e-commerce, enabling data exchange among multinational companies. He served as a member of the UN/EDIFACT international standards committee under the United Nations, and the standards committee for Electronic Commerce in the Associations of Computer and Health Industries.

Dashti served in global management roles both in multinational and start-up companies, including Western Digital Corporation and AST Computers, where he led and implemented ongoing process improvement in manufacturing, operations, sales, finance and information systems. Dashti prepared and positioned Safeskin Corporation for exit through M&A in which the company was acquired by Kimberly-Clark. He joined the management team of the California-based Broadcom Corp in an early stage and served in the team that prepared and led the company to a record setting IPO in NASDAQ (April 1998). During the years following the IPO, he planned and executed the post cross-border M&A integration processes of more than 20 companies that were acquired by Broadcom, including Maverick Networks, Epigram, BlueSteel Networks, Innovent Systems, Altima Communications, Newport Communications, and VisionTech.

== Contributions to China–Israel relations ==
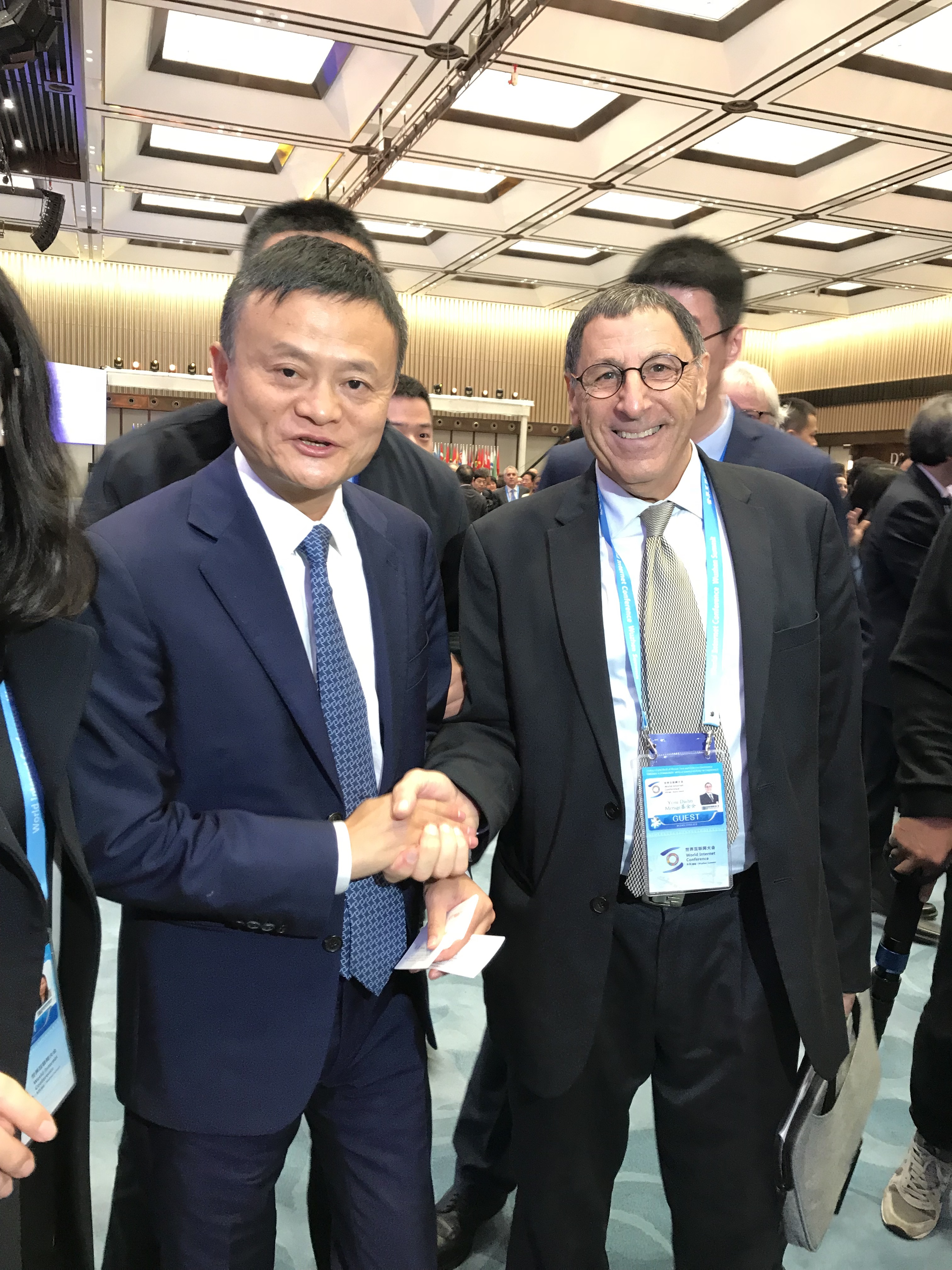
Jack Ma and Dr. Yossi Dashti

In 2008, Dashti took part in the Smart Business Network Forum initiated by Tsinghua University in Beijing, China, and in collaboration with several universities from around the globe where he shared and presented his academic research findings. The visit to China paved a new path in his work, and since then, he has been working to promote China-Israel relations in academia and industry. Among his activities are: teaching in several universities in China, providing training in the industry, exchanging academic faculty and students, arranging capital investment of Chinese funds in innovative technologies in Israel such as the CEIIF Capital Fund, and setting joint R&D and technology transfer between the countries, including Yeda Research and Development, the technology transfer arm of the Weizmann Institute of Science.

In 2013, he took part in the Beijing Forum, where he presented the policies, programs, and initiatives that Israel implemented in order to shift from a traditional and agricultural focused economy to innovation-driven economy. Dashti serves as the deputy director of the China-Israel Innovation Center in Jilin University and has been delivering keynote speeches in various conferences throughout China, including, Xian education and Hangzhou Artificial Intelligent. He participated in the Wuzhen World Internet Conference (WIC) that was initiated by Alibaba's CEO Jack Ma. In 2017, he joined a delegation of businessmen and academics led by Israeli Prime Minister Benjamin Netanyahu and jointed by the ministries of health, economic, and environment. During this visit, the China-Israel Innovation Comprehensive Partnership agreement was announced and signed. In 2018, Dashti participated in the meetings with the Chinese Vice President Wang Qishan and his delegation and at the Fourth China-Israel Innovation Conference. Dashti is part of China-Israel roadshow presents, which is an unparalleled chance to showcase Israel's hottest new technologies to Chinese business leaders in both the public and private sector. On July 15, 2019, Dashti has led the China-Israel Science and Technology Innovation Cooperation Symposium Held in Changchun.

== Social Involvement ==
Dashti is a member of the board of directors at the association of IDF, Israel Air Force's Airborne Rescue and Evacuation 669 Unit, and also a mentor for the unit's graduates. He has served as a board member of the American Technion Society, a member of the American Israel Public Affairs Committee (AIPAC), and a member of the Israeli Venture Network for social impact and sustainable social change.

== Books ==
In his book Jewish Principles Innovation and Entrepreneurship: China-Israel Collaboration Opportunities (2019), Dashti opens for readers a window into Jewish-Israeli culture that helped position Israel as an innovation nation. He analyzes seven principles that contribute to a successful innovation-driven economy and shares his insights and lessons learned during his career at the Silicon Valley and academia. In the second part of the book he addresses the growing relationship between China and Israel and the many potential opportunities for synergy and collaboration between the two countries. In the book Success Factors of Israeli Innovative Startups in the Silicon Valley (2008), Dashti researches the success factors that lead to the outstanding performance and success of Israeli technology ventures that are demonstrated in the global marketplace. Focus is given to the contribution of founder-entrepreneurs and their traits.

== Other publications ==
Dashti, Y. and Schwartz, D. (2018). Should start-ups embrace a strategic approach toward integrating foreign stakeholders into their network? International Entrepreneurship and Management Journal.

Dashti, Y. and Schwartz, D. (2015). The Role and Contribution of Networks in M&A of Innovative Ventures: Can Lessons Learned from Networks of Israeli Start-ups be applied by China? Journal of Technology Analysis & Strategic Management.

Dashti, Y. (2009). Social networks and high-tech entrepreneurs: The power of networks and how to put it to use. In A. M. Pines and M. F. Ozbilgin (Eds.) Handbook of Research on High-Technology Entrepreneurs. Cheltenham UK: Edward Elgar Ch. 20.

Dashti, Y., Schwartz, D. and Pines, A. (2008). High technology entrepreneurs, their social networks and success in global markets: The case of Israelis in the U.S. Market, Current Topics in Management, 13, 8.
