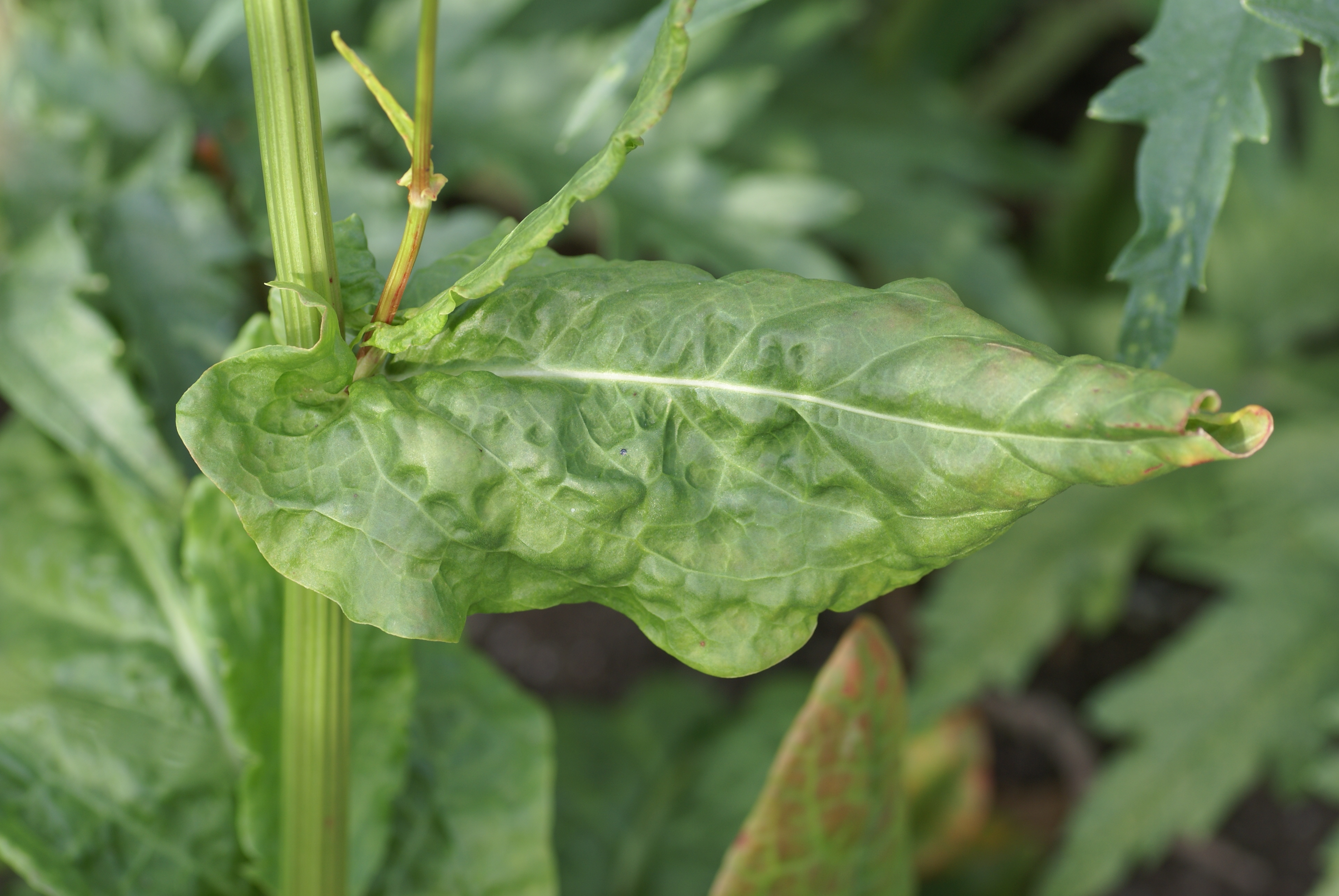
- A typically rumpled leaf
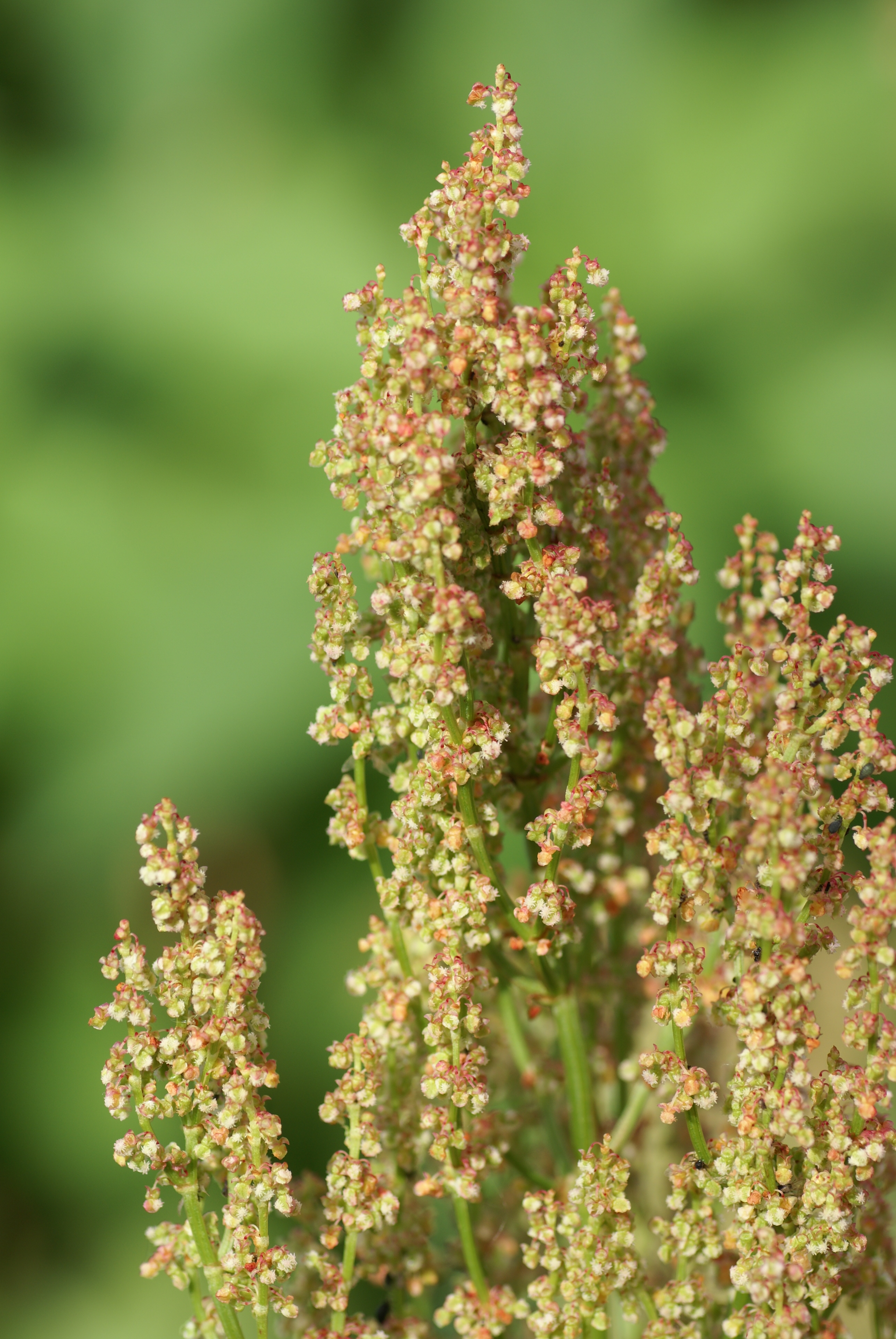
- At the Bergianska trädgården

Scientific classification
- Kingdom: Plantae
- Clade: Embryophytes
- Clade: Tracheophytes
- Clade: Spermatophytes
- Clade: Angiosperms
- Clade: Eudicots
- Order: Caryophyllales
- Family: Polygonaceae
- Genus: Rumex
- Species: R. rugosus

Binomial name
- Rumex rugosus Campd.

Synonyms
- List: Acetosa alpestris subsp. islandica Á.Löve & D.Löve; Acetosa ambigua (Gren.) Á.Löve; Acetosa pratensis subsp. ambigua (Gren.) P.D.Sell; Acetosa rugosa (Campd.) Holub; Rumex acetosa subsp. ambiguus (Gren.) Á.Löve; Rumex acetosa var. hortensis Dierb.; Rumex acetosa var. longifolius Metzg. ex Alef.; Rumex ambiguus Gren.

= Rumex rugosus =

Species of plant

Rumex rugosus, the garden sorrel, wrinkled sorrel, or wrinkled dock, is a species of flowering plant in the family Polygonaceae. It is native to Ukraine, and it has been introduced to various locales around the world. Grown as a leaf vegetable, it is a perennial cultigen probably arising from the common sorrel (Rumex acetosa).

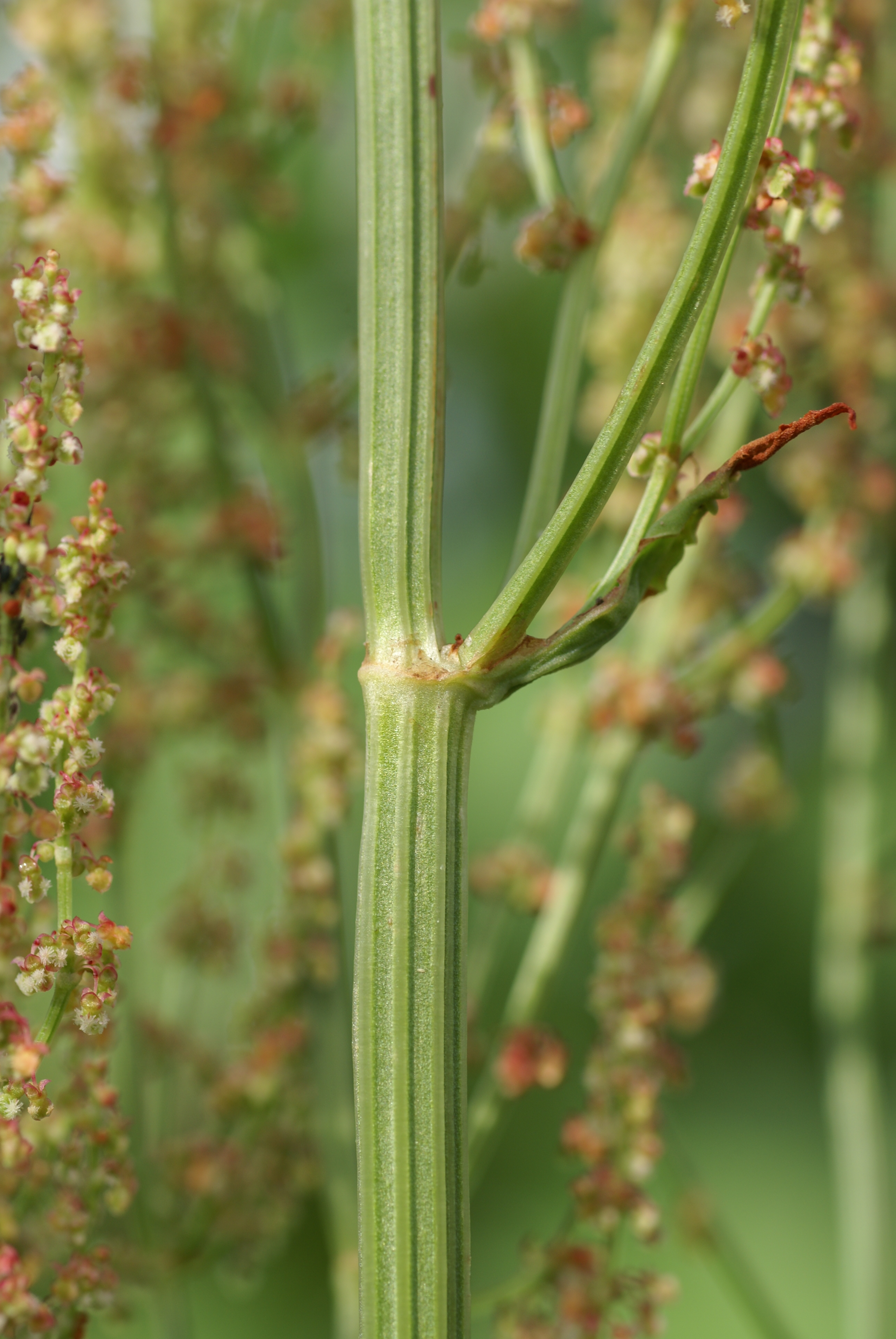
Stem
