= Chah Zangi, Kerman =

Chah Zangi چاه زنگي
- Village
- Location within Iran
- Coordinates: 27°24′10″N 57°58′13″E
- Country: Iran
- Province: Kerman
- County: Qaleh Ganj
- Bakhsh: Central
- Rural District: Qaleh Ganj

Population (2006)
  - Total: 163
- Time zone: UTC+3:30 (IRST)
  - Summer (DST): UTC+4:30 (IRDT)

Chah Zangi (Persian: چاه زنگي, also Romanized as Chāh Zangī) is a village in Qaleh Ganj Rural District, in the Central District of Qaleh Ganj County, Kerman Province, Iran. At the 2006 census, its population was 163, in 30 families.
