= Dashti-ye Hoseyn Aqa =

Dashti-ye Hoseyn Aqa دشتي حسين اقا
- Village
- Country: Iran
- Province: Khuzestan
- County: Andika
- Bakhsh: Chelo
- Rural District: Lalar and Katak

Population (2006)
  - Total: 106
- Time zone: UTC+3:30 (IRST)
  - Summer (DST): UTC+4:30 (IRDT)

Dashti-ye Hoseyn Aqa (Persian: دشتي حسين اقا, also Romanized as Dashtī-ye Ḩoseynā Āqā) is a village in Lalar and Katak Rural District, Chelo District, Andika County, Khuzestan Province, Iran. At the 2006 census, its population was 106, in 19 families.
