= Chehel Gazi, Kurdistan =

Chehel Gazi چهل گزي
- Village
- Location within Iran
- Coordinates: 35°27′06″N 46°55′44″E
- Country: Iran
- Province: Kurdistan
- County: Sanandaj
- Bakhsh: Central
- Rural District: Sarab Qamish

Population (2006)
  - Total: 148
- Time zone: UTC+3:30 (IRST)
  - Summer (DST): UTC+4:30 (IRDT)

Chehel Gazi (Persian: چهل گزي, also Romanized as Chehel Gazī and Chehl Gazī) is a village in Sarab Qamish Rural District, in the Central District of Sanandaj County, Kurdistan Province, Iran. At the 2006 census, its population was 148, in 30 families. The village is populated by Kurds.
