= Ab Pakhsh =

City in Bushehr province, Iran

Ab Pakhsh Persian: آبپخش
- City
- Ab Pakhsh
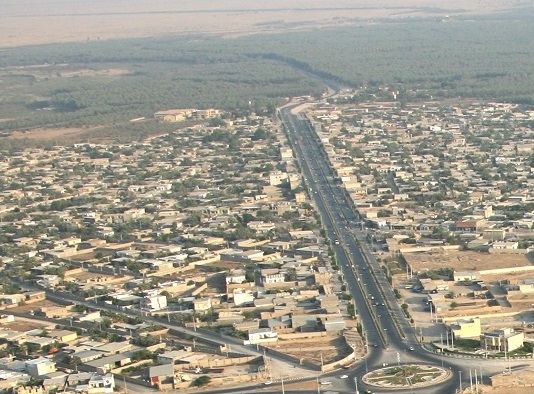
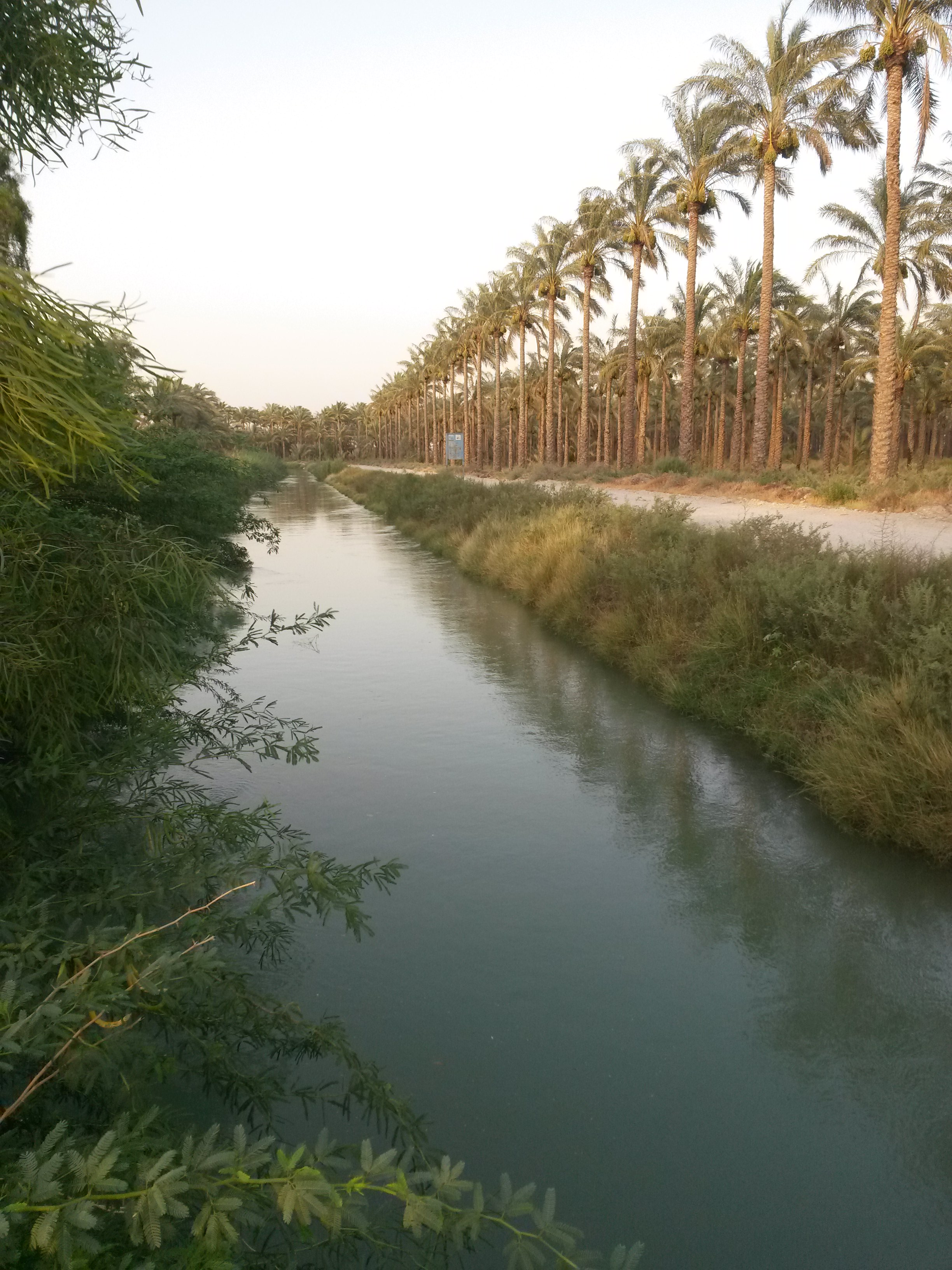
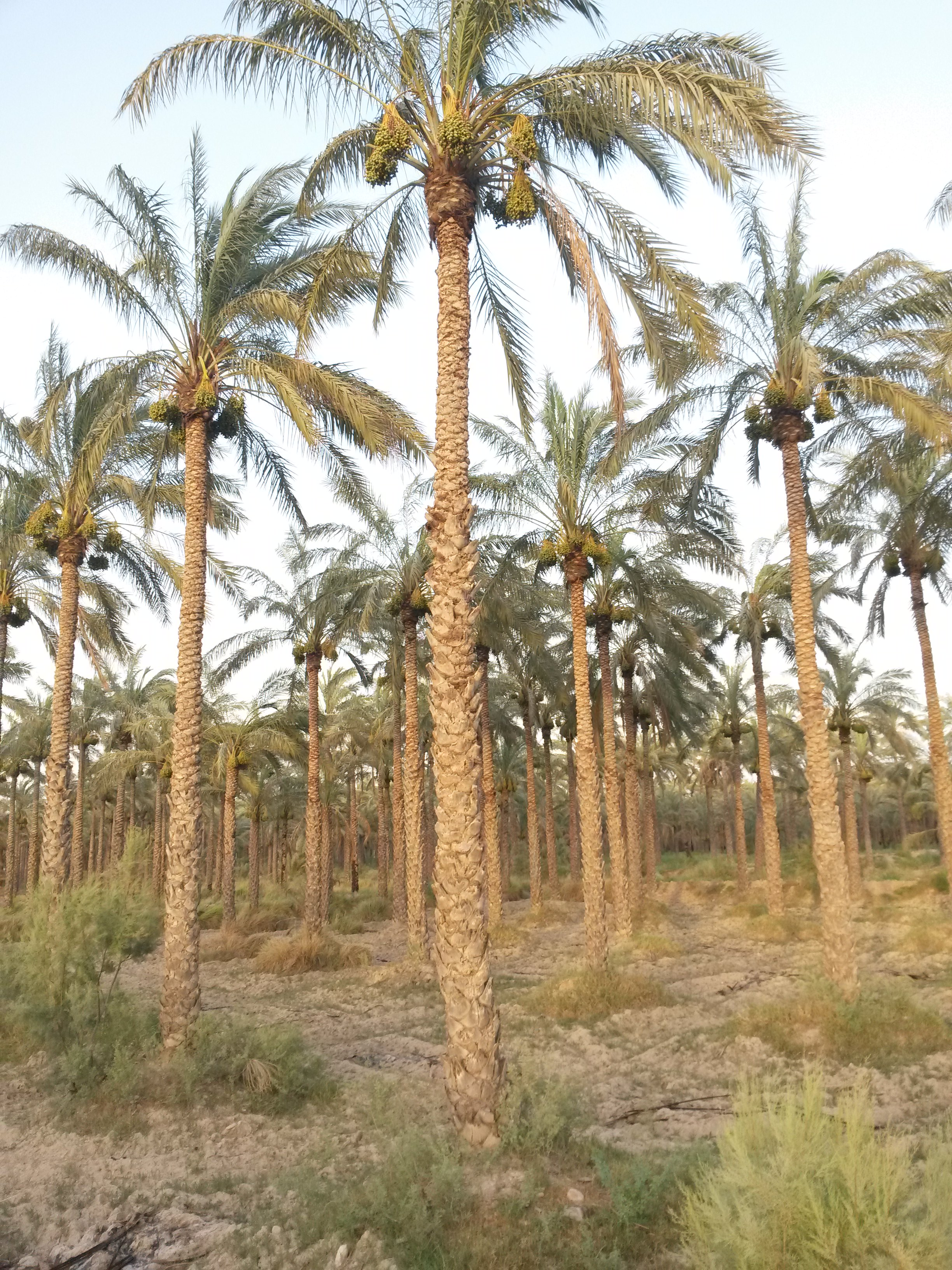
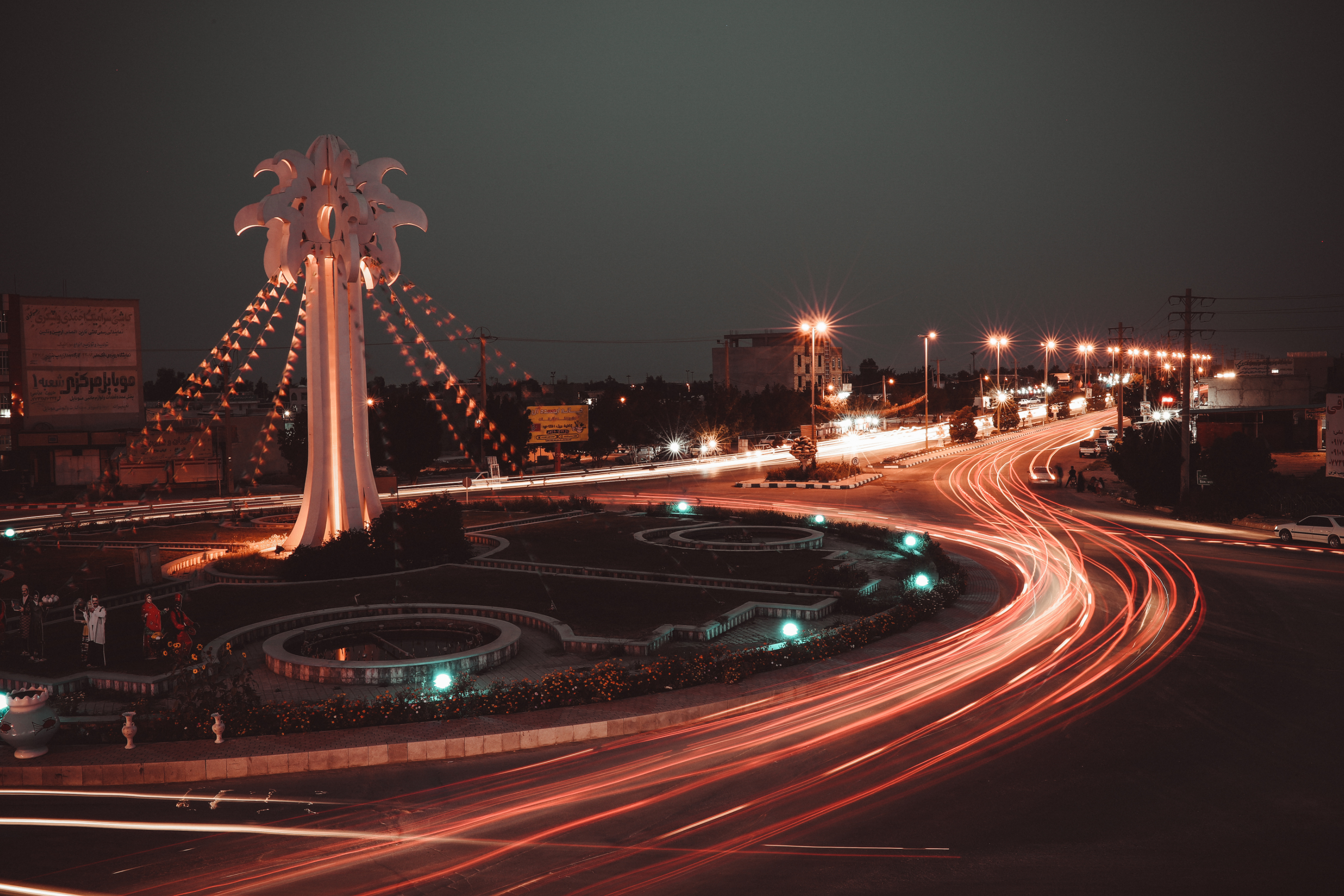
- Top-bottom, R-L: An old view of the city from the sky, Date palms in Ab Pakhsh district, ditches and Date palms in Ab Pakhsh district, Shahr-dari square and date palm monument
- Nickname: Negin-e Sabz (Green Gem)
- Location within Iran Location within West and Central Asia
- Coordinates: 29°21′40″N 51°04′18″E
- Country: Iran
- Province: Bushehr
- County: Dashtestan
- District: Ab Pakhsh
- Established as a city: 1996
- Elevation: 30 m (98 ft)

Population (2016)
  - Total: 18,913
- Time zone: UTC+3:30 (IRST)
- Area code: 077
- Climate: BSh
- Website: www.abpakhshcity.ir

Ab Pakhsh (Persian: آب پخش) (Note: Also romanized as Āb Pakhsh) is a city in, and the capital of, Ab Pakhsh District in Dashtestan County, Bushehr province, Iran. The village of Ab Pakhsh was converted to a city in 1996.

== Demographics ==
=== Population ===
At the time of the 2006 National Census, the city's population was 15,302 in 3,216 households, when it was in Shabankareh District. The following census in 2011 counted 17,238 people in 4,384 households, by which time the city had been separated from the district in the formation of Ab Pakhsh District. The 2016 census measured the population of the city as 18,913 people in 5,250 households. Ab Pakhsh is the 2nd most populous city in Dashtestan County and the 7th most populous city in Bushehr province.

Ab Pakhsh is an internationally renowned major resort city, known primarily for its date (fruit), fresh dates (Fa:رطب), Ditchs, view of date palms, and artisanal handicrafts made of date palms. The shortest route between Ab Pakhsh and Borazjan is 20 km (12 mi), Ab Pakhsh and Bushehr is 60 km (37 mi), Ab Pakhsh and Shiraz is 280 km (174 mi), Ab Pakhsh and Ahwaz is 390 km (242 mi), Ab Pakhsh and Bandar Abbas is 730 km (453 mi), Ab Pakhsh and Tehran is 1000 km (621 mi).

== Geography ==
Ab Pakhsh is situated within Dashtestan County near the Persian Gulf coast of Iran (about 30 km or 18 mi away the coast directly) and is roughly at sea level (25-30m or 82-100 ft above) and is surrounded by date palm farms ranges on east, south, and west sides; and is surrounded by the Chiti desert on north side. Much of the landscape is sabulous and arid, with desert vegetation and wildlife. Also, torrential flash floods have been seen in this area. Ab Pakhsh and other cities around it seismically are active in the Bushehr province.

Within the city, there are many lawns, trees, and other greenery. Ab Pakhsh has a hot semi-arid climate (the Köppen climate classification:BSh), typical of the Chiti Desert in which it lies. This climate is typified by hot, sometimes extremely hot summers and warm to cool winters, with some to minimal precipitation. Summers in Ab Pakhsh are hot, windy, and humid, with an average high around 35 °C(95 °F) and overnight lows around 25 °C(77 °F) in the hottest month, August. Most days are sunny throughout the year. Winters are comparatively cool, though mild to cool, with an average high of 20 °C(68 °F) and overnight lows of 10 °C(50 °F) in January, the coolest month. Ab Pakhsh summers have very high level of humidity (sometimes around 80-90%).
