= Chehel Zari, Ilam =

Chehel Zari چهل زرعي
- Village
- Location within Iran
- Coordinates: 33°59′52″N 46°03′46″E
- Country: Iran
- Province: Ilam
- County: Eyvan
- Bakhsh: Zarneh
- Rural District: Zarneh

Population (2006)
  - Total: 377
- Time zone: UTC+3:30 (IRST)
  - Summer (DST): UTC+4:30 (IRDT)

Chehel Zari (Persian: چهل زرعي, also Romanized as Chehel Zar‘ī and Chehel Zarī; also known as Chehel Gazī) is a village in Zarneh Rural District, Zarneh District, Eyvan County, Ilam Province, Iran. At the 2006 census, its population was 377, in 79 families. The village is populated by Kurds.
