= Darvahi Rural District =

Rural district in Bushehr province, Iran

Darvahi Rural District Persian: دهستان درواهي
- Rural District
- Location within Iran
- Coordinates: 29°23′N 51°05′E
- Country: Iran
- Province: Bushehr
- County: Dashtestan
- District: Ab Pakhsh
- Established: 1987
- Capital: Cham Darvahi

Population (2016)
  - Total: 3,211
- Time zone: UTC+3:30 (IRST)

Darvahi Rural District (Persian: دهستان درواهي) is in Ab Pakhsh District of Dashtestan County, Bushehr province, Iran. Its capital is the village of Cham Darvahi.

== Demographics ==
=== Population ===
At the time of the 2006 National Census, the rural district's population (as a part of Shabankareh District) was 4,546 in 937 households. There were 3,056 inhabitants in 736 households at the following census of 2011, by which time the rural district had been separated from the district in the formation of Ab Pakhsh District. The 2016 census measured the population of the rural district as 3,211 in 931 households. The most populous of its eight villages was Chahar Borj, with 1,294 people.

=== Other villages in the rural district ===
- Bonar-e Azadegan
- Ganaveh Kan
- Mian Dasht
- Moshfaqabad
