= Ab Pakhsh District =

District in Bushehr province, Iran

Ab Pakhsh District Persian: بخش آب پخش
- District
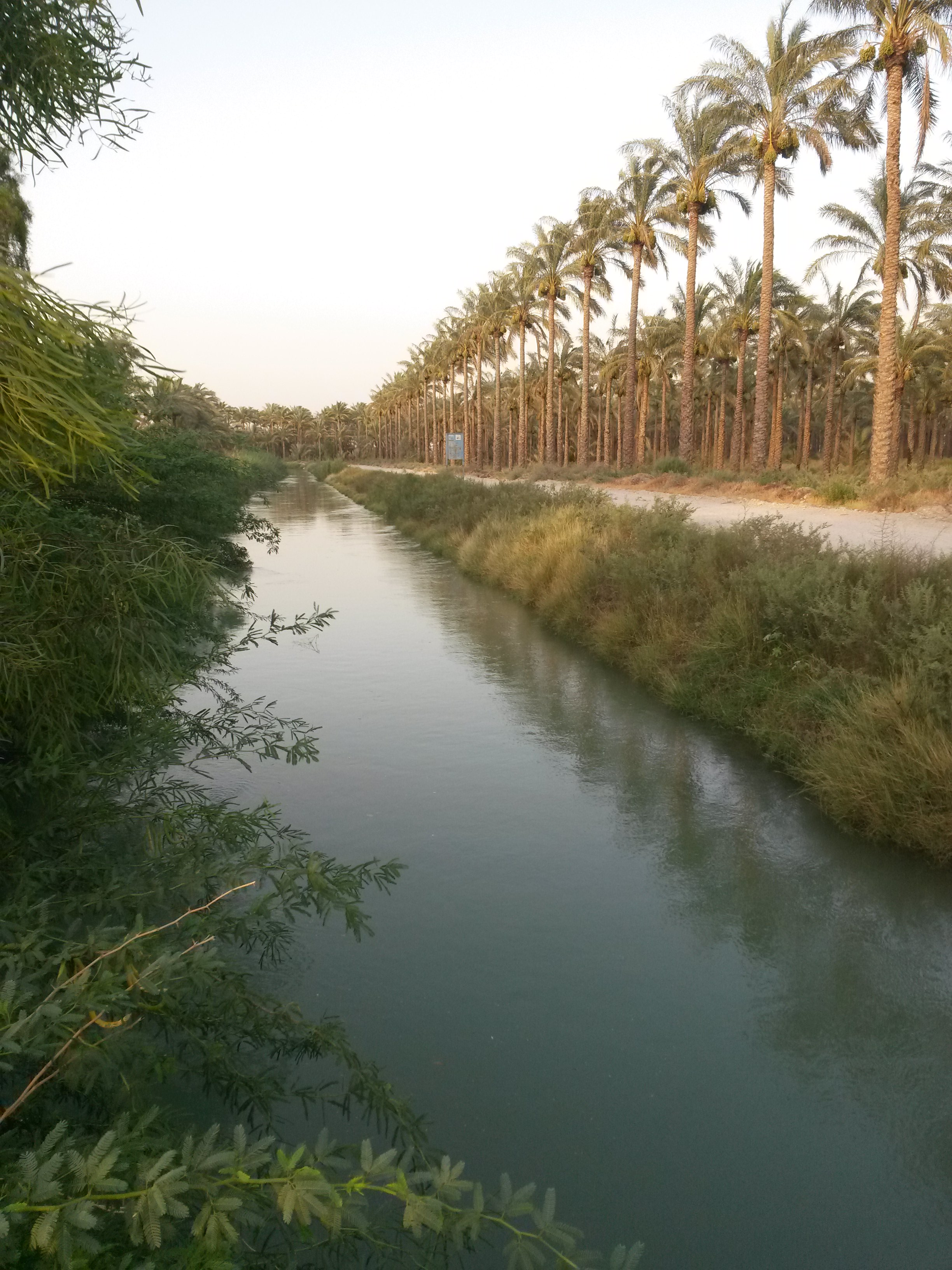
- Stream in the city of Ab Pakhsh

- Location within Iran
- Coordinates: 29°21′27″N 50°57′16″E
- Country: Iran
- Province: Bushehr
- County: Dashtestan
- Established: 2009
- Capital: Ab Pakhsh

Population (2016)
  - Total: 23,132
- Time zone: UTC+3:30 (IRST)

Ab Pakhsh District (Persian: بخش آب پخش) is in Dashtestan County, Bushehr province, Iran. Its capital is the city of Ab Pakhsh.

== History ==
In 2009, Darvahi Rural District and the city of Ab Pakhsh were separated from Shabankareh District in the formation of Ab Pakhsh District.

== Demographics ==
=== Population ===
The 2011 census counted 21,352 people in 5,377 households. The 2016 census measured the population of the district as 23,132 inhabitants living in 6,478 households.

=== Administrative divisions ===
Ab Pakhsh District Population
Administrative Divisions	2011	2016
Darvahi RD	3,056	3,211
Dashti-ye Esmail Khani RD	1,058	1,008
Ab Pakhsh (city)	17,238	18,913
Total	21,352	23,132
RD = Rural District
