= Shabankareh District =

District in Bushehr province, Iran

Shabankareh District Persian: بخش شبانکاره
- District
- Location within Iran
- Coordinates: 29°36′N 50°58′E
- Country: Iran
- Province: Bushehr
- County: Dashtestan
- Capital: Shabankareh

Population (2016)
  - Total: 22,348
- Time zone: UTC+3:30 (IRST)

Shabankareh District (Persian: بخش شبانکاره) is in Dashtestan County, Bushehr province, Iran. Its capital is the city of Shabankareh. (Note: Formerly Deh-e Kohneh)

== History ==
In 2009, Darvahi Rural District and the city of Ab Pakhsh were separated from the district in the formation of Ab Pakhsh District.

== Demographics ==
=== Population ===
At the time of the 2006 National Census, the district's population was 39,214 in 8,130 households. The following census in 2011 counted 20,022 people in 5,004 households. The 2016 census measured the population of the district as 22,348 inhabitants living in 6,294 households.

=== Administrative divisions ===
Shabankareh District Population
Administrative Divisions	2006	2011	2016
Darvahi RD (Note: Became a part of Ab Pakhsh District)	4,546		
Shabankareh RD	12,391	12,369	14,448
Ab Pakhsh (city)	15,302		
Shabankareh (city) (Note: Formerly the village of Deh-e Kohneh)	6,975	7,653	7,900
Total	39,214	20,022	22,348
RD = Rural District
