= Dashtestan County =

County in Bushehr province, Iran

Dashtestan County Persian: شهرستان دشتستان
- County
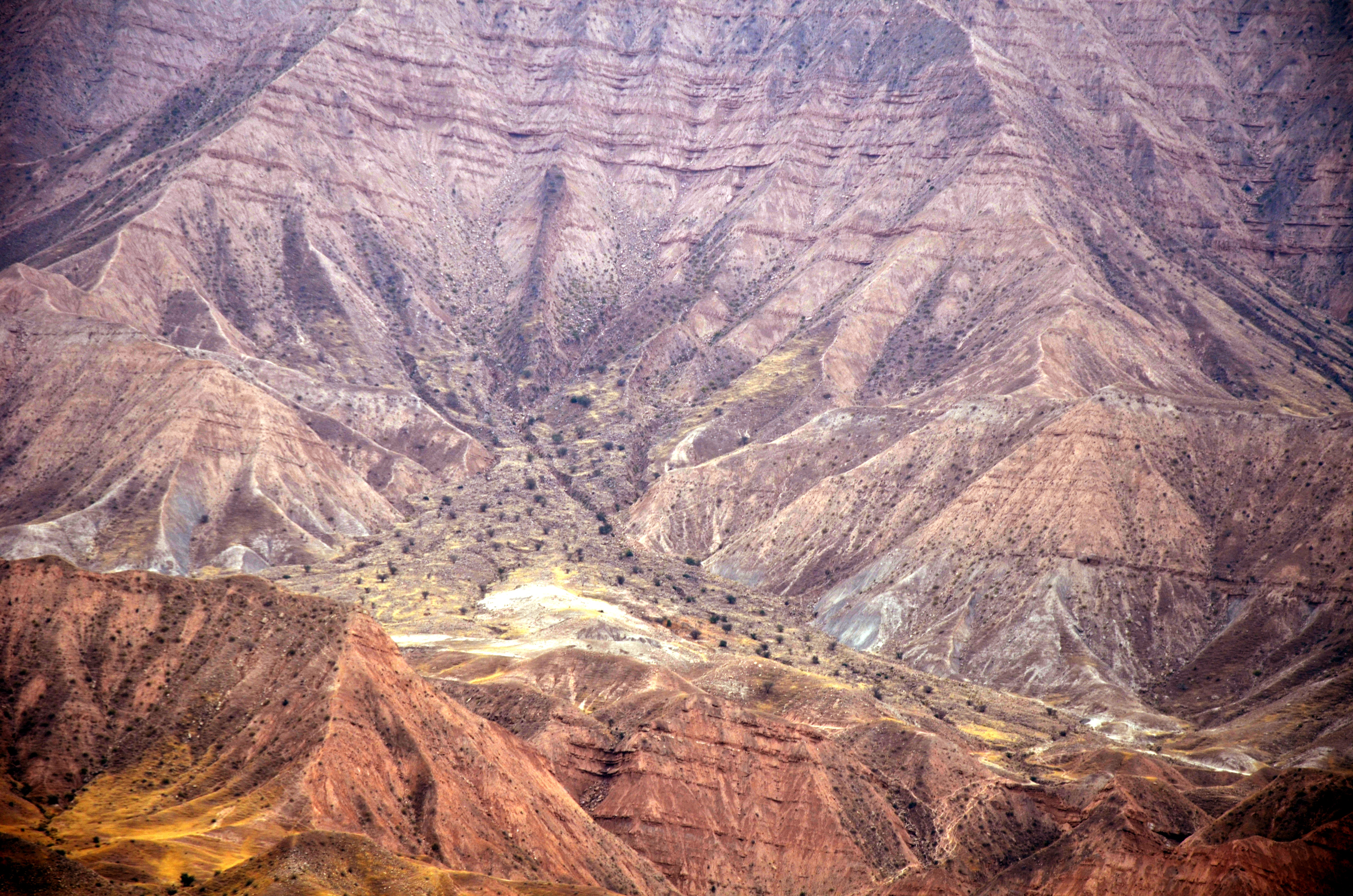
- Dalaki Valley

- Location of Dashtestan County in Bushehr province (top, green)

- Location of Bushehr province in Iran
- Coordinates: 29°26′N 51°15′E
- Country: Iran
- Province: Bushehr
- Capital: Borazjan
- Districts: Central, Ab Pakhsh, Bushkan, Eram, Sadabad, Shabankareh

Area
  - Total: 6,327 km^{2} (2,443 sq mi)

Population (2016)
  - Total: 252,047
  - Density: 39.84/km^{2} (103.2/sq mi)
- Time zone: UTC+3:30 (IRST)

Dashtestan County (Persian: شهرستان دشتستان) is in Bushehr province, Iran. Its capital is the city of Borazjan.

== History ==
The Gur-e-Dokhtar is a 6th-century tomb near the border with Fars province. It is probably the resting place of Cyrus I (Cyrus II's grandfather).

The people of the area revolted against Nader Shah in September 1746. In June 1747, the rebels captured Bushehr.

In 2009, Darvahi Rural District and the city of Ab Pakhsh were separated from Shabankareh District in the formation of Ab Pakhsh District, which was divided into two rural districts, including the new Dashti-ye Esmail Khani Rural District. The village of Bushkan was elevated to the status of a city in 2012.

== Demographics ==
=== Population ===
At the time of the 2006 National Census, the county's population was 222,226 in 47,773 households. The following census in 2011 counted 229,425 people in 57,562 households. The 2016 census measured the population of the county as 252,047 in 70,943 households.

=== Administrative divisions ===
Dashtestan County's population history and administrative structure over three consecutive censuses are shown in the following table.

Dashtestan County Population
Administrative Divisions	2006	2011	2016
Central District	124,291	128,334	145,460
Dalaki RD	10,490	11,761	12,208
Howmeh RD (Note: Formerly Khvosh Makan Rural District)	6,838	8,148	9,603
Ziarat RD	6,881	6,932	6,646
Borazjan (city)	92,221	95,449	110,567
Dalaki (city)	7,861	6,044	6,436
Ab Pakhsh District		21,352	23,132
Darvahi RD		3,056	3,211
Dashti-ye Esmail Khani RD		1,058	1,008
Ab Pakhsh (city)		17,238	18,913
Bushkan District	12,242	11,915	12,943
Bushkan RD	4,409	4,181	2,434
Poshtkuh RD	5,896	5,570	5,911
Bushkan (city)			2,135
Kalameh (city)	1,937	2,164	2,463
Eram District	14,551	13,375	13,659
Dehrud RD	5,507	5,072	5,372
Eram RD	6,116	5,120	5,045
Tang-e Eram (city)	2,928	3,183	3,242
Sadabad District	31,928	33,272	33,513
Vahdatiyeh RD	2,120	1,717	1,724
Zirrah RD	11,666	12,282	12,319
Sadabad (city)	7,119	7,859	8,248
Vahdatiyeh (city)	11,023	11,414	11,222
Shabankareh District	39,214	20,022	22,348
Darvahi RD	4,546		
Shabankareh RD	12,391	12,369	14,448
Ab Pakhsh (city)	15,302		
Shabankareh (city) (Note: Formerly the village of Deh-e Kohneh)	6,975	7,653	7,900
Total	222,226	229,425	252,047
RD = Rural District

== See also ==
Media related to Dashtestan County at Wikimedia Commons
