= Kheyrabad =

Kheyrabad or Kheir Abad (Persian: خیرآباد) may refer to:

== Afghanistan ==
- Kheyrabad, Baharak District, Badakhshan
- Kheyrabad, Khwahan District, Badakhshan
- Kheyrabad, Balkh
- Kheyrabad, Faryab
- Kheyrabad, Ghor
- Kheyrabad, Helmand
- Kheyrabad, Kabul
- Kheyrabad, Kunduz
- Kheyrabad, Nimruz

== Iran ==
=== Alborz Province ===
- Kheyrabad, Alborz, a village in Savojbolagh County

=== Bushehr Province ===
- Kheyrabad, Bushehr, a village in Dashtestan County

=== Chaharmahal and Bakhtiari Province ===
- Kheyrabad, Chaharmahal and Bakhtiari, a village in Kiar County

=== East Azerbaijan Province ===
- Kheyrabad, Bostanabad, a village in Bostanabad County
- Kheyrabad, Meyaneh, a village in Meyaneh County

=== Fars Province ===
- Kheyrabad, Arsanjan, a village in Arsanjan County
- Kheyrabad (30°00′ N 53°45′ E), Bavanat, a village in Bavanat County
- Kheyrabad, Darab, a village in Darab County
- Kheyrabad, Rostaq, a village in Darab County
- Kheyrabad, Jangal, a village in Fasa County
- Kheyrabad, Kushk-e Qazi, a village in Fasa County
- Kheyrabad, Firuzabad, a village in Firuzabad County
- Kheyrabad-e Koruni, a village in Kazerun County
- Kheyrabad, Kharameh, a village in Kharameh County
- Kheyrabad Rural District, in Kharameh County
- Kheyrabad, Khonj, a village in Khonj County
- Kheyrabad, Khorrambid, a village in Khorrambid County
- Kheyrabad, Mashhad-e Morghab, a village in Khorrambid County
- Kheyrabad, Marvdasht, a village in Marvdasht County
- Kheyrabad-e Hajji Ahmad, a village in Neyriz County
- Kheyrabad, Qir and Karzin, a village in Qir and Karzin County
- Kheyrabad, Sarvestan, a village in Sarvestan County
- Kheyrabad, Sepidan, a village in Sepidan County
- Kheyrabad, Arzhan, a village in Shiraz County
- Kheyrabad, Zarqan, a village in Shiraz County

=== Hamadan Province ===
- Kheyrabad, Hamadan, a village in Hamadan County
- Kheyrabad, Malayer, a village in Malayer County
- Kheyrabad, Razan, a village in Razan County
- Kheyrabad, Tuyserkan, a village in Tuyserkan County

=== Hormozgan Province ===
- Kheyrabad, Jask, a village in Jask County
- Kheyrabad, Lirdaf, a village in Jask County
- Kheyrabad, Rudan, a village in Rudan County
- Kheyrabad, Rudkhaneh, a village in Rudan County

=== Isfahan Province ===
- Kheyrabad, Ardestan, a village in Ardestan County
- Kheyrabad, Chadegan, a village in Chadegan County
- Kheyrabad, Falavarjan, a village in Falavarjan County
- Kheyrabad, Kuhpayeh, a village in Isfahan County
- Kheyrabad, Kuhestan, a village in Nain County
- Kheyrabad, Najafabad, a village in Najafabad County
- Kheyrabad, Tiran and Karvan, a village in Tiran and Karvan County
- Kheyrabad, alternate name of Jafarabad, Tiran and Karvan, a village in Tiran and Karvan County

=== Kerman Province ===
- Kheyrabad, Anbarabad, a village in Anbarabad County
- Kheyrabad-e Pateli, a village in Anbarabad County
- Kheyrabad, Arzuiyeh, a village in Arzuiyeh County
- Kheyrabad, alternate name of Heydarabad, Arzuiyeh, a village in Arzuiyeh County
- Kheyrabad, Bardsir, a village in Bardsir County
- Kheyrabad, Mashiz, a village in Bardsir County
- Kheyrabad, Fahraj, a village in Fahraj County
- Kheyrabad, Kerman, a village in Kerman County
- Kheyrabad, Rayen, a village in Kerman County
- Kheyrabad, Narmashir, a village in Narmashir County
- Kheyrabad, Rudbar-e Jonubi, a village in Rudbar-e Jonubi County
- Kheyrabad-e Olya, Kerman, a village in Shahr-e Babak County
- Kheyrabad, Balvard, a village in Sirjan County
- Kheyrabad, Mahmudabad-e Seyyed, a village in Sirjan County
- Kheyrabad, Sharifabad, a village in Sirjan County
- Kheyrabad, Zarand, a village in Zarand County

=== Kermanshah Province ===
- Kheyrabad, Kermanshah, a village in Sahneh County

=== Khuzestan Province ===
- Kheyrabad-e Gohar, a village in Behbahan County
- Kheyrabad-e Do, a village in Shush County
- Kheyrabad-e Sani, a village in Shush County

=== Kohgiluyeh and Boyer-Ahmad Province ===
- Kheyrabad Khalifeh, a village in Gachsaran County
- Kheyrabad-e Naser, a village in Gachsaran County
- Kheyrabad-e Seyf Laleh, a village in Gachsaran County
- Kheyrabad-e Sofla, Kohgiluyeh and Boyer-Ahmad, a village in Gachsaran County

=== Kurdistan Province ===
- Kheyrabad, Kamyaran, a village in Kamyaran County
- Kheyrabad, Marivan, a village in Marivan County

=== Lorestan Province ===
- Kheyrabad, Aligudarz, a village in Aligudarz County
- Kheyrabad, Zaz va Mahru, a village in Aligudarz County
- Kheyrabad-e Olya, Lorestan, a village in Dowreh County
- Kheyrabad-e Sofla, Lorestan, a village in Dowreh County

=== Markazi Province ===
- Kheyrabad, Arak, a village in Arak County
- Kheyrabad, Khomeyn, a village in Khomeyn County
- Kheyrabad, Komijan, a village in Komijan County
- Kheyrabad, Shazand, a village in Shazand County

=== Mazandaran Province ===
- Kheyrabad, Mazandaran, a village in Neka County

=== North Khorasan Province ===
- Kheyrabad, Esfarayen, a village in Esfarayen County
- Kheyrabad, Faruj, a village in Faruj County
- Kheyrabad, Shirvan, a village in Shirvan County

=== Qazvin Province ===
- Kheyrabad, Buin Zahra, a village in Buin Zahra County
- Kheyrabad, Qazvin, a village in Qazvin County

=== Razavi Khorasan Province ===
- Kheyrabad, Chenaran, a village in Chenaran County
- Kheyrabad, Golbajar, a village in Chenaran County
- Kheyrabad-e Olya, Razavi Khorasan, a village in Dargaz County
- Kheyrabad-e Sofla, Razavi Khorasan, a village in Dargaz County
- Kheyrabad, Jowayin, a village in Jowayin County
- Kheyrabad, Khvaf, a village in Khvaf County
- Kheyrabad, Mahvelat, a village in Mahvelat County
- Kheyrabad, Mashhad, a village in Mashhad County
- Kheyrabad, Razaviyeh, a village in Mashhad County
- Kheyrabad, Fazl, a village in Nishapur County
- Kheyrabad, Mazul, a village in Nishapur County
- Kheyrabad, Miyan Jolgeh, a village in Nishapur County
- Kheyrabad, Sarvelayat, a village in Nishapur County
- Kheyrabad, Quchan, a village in Quchan County
- Kheyrabad-e Sharqi, a village in Quchan County
- Kheyrabad, Sabzevar, a village in Sabzevar County
- Kheyrabad, Rud Ab, a village in Sabzevar County
- Kheyrabad, Taybad, a village in Taybad County
- Kheyrabad, Nasrabad, a village in Torbat-e Jam County
- Kheyrabad, Salehabad, a village in Torbat-e Jam County

=== Semnan Province ===
- Kheyrabad, Semnan, a village in Semnan County

=== Sistan and Baluchestan Province ===
- Kheyrabad, Bampur, a village in Bampur County
- Kheyrabad, Dalgan, a village in Dalgan County
- Kheyrabad, Iranshahr, a village in Iranshahr County
- Kheyrabad, Bazman, a village in Iranshahr County

=== South Khorasan Province ===
- Kheyrabad, Boshruyeh, a village in Boshruyeh County
- Kheyrabad, Darmian, a village in Darmian County
- Kheyrabad, Khusf, a village in Khusf County
- Kheyrabad, Nehbandan, a village in Nehbandan County
- Kheyrabad, Sarbisheh, a village in Sarbisheh County

=== Tehran Province ===
- Kheyrabad, Baharestan, a village in Bahrestan County
- Kheyrabad, Rey, a village in Rey County

=== West Azerbaijan Province ===
- Kheyrabad, West Azerbaijan, a village in Miandoab County

=== Yazd Province ===
- Kheyrabad, Behabad, a village in Behabad County
- Kheyrabad, Taft, a village in Taft County
- Kheyrabad, Yazd, a village in Yazd County

=== Zanjan Province ===
- Kheyrabad, Soltaniyeh, a village in Abhar County
- Kheyrabad, Mahneshan, a village in Mahneshan County

== See also ==
- Khairabad (disambiguation)
- Khayrobod (disambiguation)
- Kheyrabad-e Olya (disambiguation)
- Kheyrabad-e Sofla (disambiguation)
