= Khairabad =

Khairabad may refer to:

- Khairabad, Mau, a town in Mau district, Uttar Pradesh, India
- Khairabad, Sitapur, a town in Sitapur district, Uttar Pradesh, India
- Khairabad, Pakistan, Khyber Pakhtunkhwa, Pakistan
- Raminji, Gilgit-Baltistan, Pakistan
- Kheyrabad, Khwahan District, Badakhshan Province, Afghanistan

== Iran ==
- Khairabad, Chaharmahal and Bakhtiari
- Khairabad Masjid, East Azerbaijan Province
- Khairabad, Meyaneh, East Azerbaijan Province
- Khairabad, Darab, Fars Province
- Khairabad, Kharameh, Fars Province
- Khairabad, Qir and Karzin, Fars Province
- Khairabad, Sarvestan, Fars Province
- Khairabad, Sepidan, Fars Province
- Khairabad, Shiraz, Fars Province
- Khairabad, Hamadan
- Khairabad, Isfahan
- Khairabad, Kerman
- Khairabad, Balvard, Sirjan County, Kerman Province
- Khairabad, Sharifabad, Sirjan County, Kerman Province
- Khairabad, Zarand, Kerman Province
- Khairabad, Kermanshah
- Khairabad, Khuzestan
- Khairabad, Kohgiluyeh and Boyer-Ahmad
- Khairabad, alternate name of Kheyrabad-e Naser, Kohgiluyeh and Boyer-Ahmad Province
- Khairabad, Kamyaran, Kurdistan Province
- Khairabad, Marivan, Kurdistan Province
- Khairabad, Sanandaj, Kurdistan Province
- Khairabad, Lorestan
- Khairabad, Markazi
- Khairabad, North Khorasan
- Khairabad, Razavi Khorasan
- Khairabad, South Khorasan (disambiguation)
- Kheyrabad, Yazd
- Khairabad, Zanjan

== See also ==
- Kheyrabad (disambiguation)
- Khayrobod (disambiguation)
- Khairpur (disambiguation)
