= Kheyrabad-e Olya =

Kheyrabad-e Olya (Persian: خيرابادعليا) may refer to:

- Kheyrabad-e Olya, Kerman
- Kheyrabad-e Olya, Kohgiluyeh and Boyer-Ahmad
- Kheyrabad-e Olya, Lorestan
- Kheyrabad-e Olya, Razavi Khorasan
