= Borzelan =

Borzelan or Borzolan (Persian: برزلان) may refer to:

- Borzelan-e Olya
- Borzelan-e Sofla
