= Kheyrabad-e Humeh =

Kheyrabad-e Humeh (Persian: خيرابادحومه) may refer to:

- Kheyrabad-e Humeh, Fars
- Kheyrabad-e Humeh, Kerman
