= Ghuzn =

Ghuzn Ғузн
- Location in Tajikistan
- Coordinates: 39°20′06″N 69°16′29″E
- Country: Tajikistan
- Region: Sughd Region
- District: Kuhistoni Mastchoh District

Population (2017)
  - Total: 1,115
- Official languages: Russian (Interethnic); Tajik (State)

Ghuzn (Tajik: Ғузн) is a village in Sughd Region, northwestern Tajikistan. It is part of the jamoat Ivan-Tojik in the Kuhistoni Mastchoh District. Population — 1115 people (2017).
