= Kheyrabad-e Sofla =

Kheyrabad-e Sofla (Persian: خيرآباد سفلي) may refer to:

- Kheyrabad-e Sofla, Kohgiluyeh and Boyer-Ahmad
- Kheyrabad-e Sofla, Lorestan
- Kheyrabad-e Sofla, Razavi Khorasan
