= Ghaz =

Ghaz Ғаз
- Country: Tajikistan
- Region: Sughd Region
- District: Kuhistoni Mastchoh District

Population (2017)
  - Total: 116
- Official languages: Russian (Interethnic); Tajik (State)

Ghaz (Tajik: Ғаз) is a village in Sughd Region, northwestern Tajikistan. It is part of the jamoat Ivan-Tojik in the Kuhistoni Mastchoh District. Population — 116 people (2017).
