= Obburdoni Kuhna =

Village in Sughd Region, Tajikistan

Obburdoni Kuhna Оббурдони Куҳна
- Country: Tajikistan
- Region: Sughd Region
- District: Kuhistoni Mastchoh District

Population (2017)
  - Total: 1,726
- Official languages: Russian (Interethnic); Tajik (State)

Obburdoni Kuhna (Tajik: Оббурдони Куҳна) is a village in Sughd Region, northwestern Tajikistan. It is part of the jamoat Ivan-Tojik in the Kuhistoni Mastchoh District. Population — 1726 people (2017).
