= Imbef =

Imbef Имбеф
- Location in Tajikistan
- Coordinates: 39°19′23″N 69°05′06″E
- Country: Tajikistan
- Region: Sughd Region
- District: Kuhistoni Mastchoh District

Population (2017)
  - Total: 301
- Official languages: Russian (Interethnic); Tajik (State)

Imbef (Tajik: Имбеф) is a village in Sughd Region, northwestern Tajikistan. It is part of the jamoat Ivan-Tojik in the Kuhistoni Mastchoh District. Population — 301 people (2017).
