= Patali =

Patali or Pateli (Persian: پاتلي) may refer to:

- Patali, Anbarabad
- Patali, Jiroft
