= Qaleh-ye Ali Mohammad =

Village in North Khorasan province, Iran

Qaleh-ye Ali Mohammad Persian: قلعه عليمحمد
- Village
- Location within Iran
- Coordinates: 37°44′35″N 57°37′02″E
- Country: Iran
- Province: North Khorasan
- County: Shirvan
- District: Qushkhaneh
- Rural District: Qushkhaneh-ye Pain

Population (2016)
  - Total: 406
- Time zone: UTC+3:30 (IRST)

Qaleh-ye Ali Mohammad (Persian: قلعه عليمحمد) (Note: Also romanized as Qal‘eh-ye ‘Alī Moḩammad; also known as ‘Alī Moḩammad, Kalāt-e ‘Alī Moḩammad, and Qal‘eh ‘Ali Muhammad) is a village in, and the capital of, Qushkhaneh-ye Pain Rural District in Qushkhaneh District of Shirvan County, North Khorasan province, Iran.

== Demographics ==
=== Population ===
At the time of the 2006 National Census, the village's population was 460 in 104 households, when it was in Qushkhaneh-ye Bala Rural District. (Note: Formerly Qushkhaneh Rural District) The following census in 2011 counted 374 people in 111 households, by which time the village had been transferred to Qushkhaneh-ye Pain Rural District. The 2016 census measured the population of the village as 406 people in 125 households.
