= Padrokh =

Padrokh Падрох
- Country: Tajikistan
- Region: Sughd Region
- District: Kuhistoni Mastchoh District

Population (2017)
  - Total: 516
- Official languages: Russian (Interethnic); *Tajik (State)[1]

Padrokh (Tajik: Падрох) is a village in Sughd Region, northwestern Tajikistan. It is part of the jamoat Ivan-Tojik in the Kuhistoni Mastchoh District. Population — 516 people (2017).
