= Shanaqi =

Shanaqi or Shenaqi or Shanqi (Persian: شناقي) may refer to:

- Shanaqi-ye Olya
- Shanaqi-ye Sofla
