= Dashti Obburdon =

Dashti Obburdon Дашти Оббурдон
- Location in Tajikistan
- Coordinates: 39°24′09″N 69°05′33″E
- Country: Tajikistan
- Region: Sughd Region
- District: Kuhistoni Mastchoh District

Population (2017)
  - Total: 832
- Official languages: Russian (Interethnic); Tajik (State)

Dashti Obburdon (Tajik: Дашти Оббурдон) is a village in Sughd Region, northwestern Tajikistan. It is part of the jamoat Ivan-Tojik in the Kuhistoni Mastchoh District. Population — 832 people (2017).
