= Dashtak, Kuhistoni Mastchoh District =

Dashtak Даштак
- Country: Tajikistan
- Region: Sughd Region
- District: Kuhistoni Mastchoh District

Population (2017)
  - Total: 160
- Official languages: Russian (Interethnic); Tajik (State)

Dashtak (Tajik: Даштак) is a village in Sughd Region, northwestern Tajikistan. It is part of the jamoat Ivan-Tojik in the Kuhistoni Mastchoh District. Population — 160 people (2017).
