= Arnakhon =

Arnakhon Арнохун
- Country: Tajikistan
- Region: Sughd Region
- District: Kuhistoni Mastchoh District

Population (2017)
  - Total: 172
- Official languages: Russian (Interethnic); Tajik (State)

Arnokhun (Tajik: Арнохун) is a village in Sughd Region, northwestern Tajikistan. It is part of the jamoat Ivan-Tojik in the Kuhistoni Mastchoh District. Population – 172 people (2017).
