= Andarvasht =

Andarvasht Андарвашт
- Location in Tajikistan
- Coordinates: 39°19′17″N 69°06′21″E
- Country: Tajikistan
- Region: Sughd Region
- District: Kuhistoni Mastchoh District

Population (2017)
  - Total: 151
- Official languages: Russian (Interethnic); Tajik (State)

Andarvasht (Tajik: Андарвашт) is a village in Sughd Region, northwestern Tajikistan. It is part of the jamoat Ivan-Tojik in the Kuhistoni Mastchoh District. Population — 151 people (2017).
