= Neynizak =

Village in Bushehr province, Iran

Neynizak Persian: نی‌نیزک
- Village
- Location within Iran
- Coordinates: 29°10′38″N 51°18′28″E
- Country: Iran
- Province: Bushehr
- County: Dashtestan
- District: Central
- Rural District: Howmeh

Population (2016)
  - Total: 576
- Time zone: UTC+3:30 (IRST)

Neynizak (Persian: نی‌نیزک) (Note: Also romanized as Neynīzak; also known as Nanīzak and Nānzak) is a village in Howmeh Rural District (Note: Formerly Khvosh Makan Rural District) of the Central District in Dashtestan County, Bushehr province, Iran.

== Demographics ==
=== Population ===
At the time of the 2006 National Census, the village's population was 562 in 125 households. The following census in 2011 counted 618 people in 163 households. The 2016 census measured the population of the village as 576 people in 159 households.
