= Kolol =

Kolol or Kolal (Persian: كلل) may refer to:

- Kolol, Dashtestan
- Kolol, Dashti
- Kolal, a village in the Debre Nazret municipality in Ethiopia
