= Khvosh Makan, Bushehr =

Village in Bushehr province, Iran

Khvosh Makan Persian: خوش مكان
- Village
- Location within Iran
- Coordinates: 29°13′44″N 51°07′26″E
- Country: Iran
- Province: Bushehr
- County: Dashtestan
- District: Central
- Rural District: Howmeh

Population (2016)
  - Total: 1,087
- Time zone: UTC+3:30 (IRST)

Khvosh Makan (Persian: خوش مكان) (Note: Also romanized as Khowsh Makān and Khvosh Makān; also known as Khosh Makān) is a village in, and the former capital of, Howmeh Rural District (Note: Formerly Khvosh Makan Rural District) in the Central District of Dashtestan County, Bushehr province, Iran. The capital of the rural district has been transferred to the village of Sar Korreh.

== Demographics ==
=== Population ===
At the time of the 2006 National Census, the village's population was 1,117 in 245 households. The following census in 2011 counted 1,135 people in 303 households. The 2016 census measured the population of the village as 1,087 people in 303 households.
