= Jangah, North Khorasan =

Village in North Khorasan province, Iran

Jangah Persian: جنگا ه
- Village
- Location within Iran
- Coordinates: 37°45′04″N 57°35′22″E
- Country: Iran
- Province: North Khorasan
- County: Shirvan
- District: Qushkhaneh
- Rural District: Qushkhaneh-ye Pain

Population (2016)
  - Total: 101
- Time zone: UTC+3:30 (IRST)

Jangah (Persian: جنگاه) (Note: Also romanized as Jangāh and Jongāh) is a village in Qushkhaneh-ye Pain Rural District of Qushkhaneh District in Shirvan County, North Khorasan province, Iran.

== Demographics ==
=== Population ===
At the time of the 2006 National Census, the village's population was 238 in 56 households. The following census in 2011 counted 175 people in 50 households. The 2016 census measured the population of the village as 101 people in 29 households.
