= Bonar-e Ab-e Shirin =

Village in Bushehr province, Iran

Bonar-e Ab-e Shirin Persian: بناراب شيرين
- Village
- Location within Iran
- Coordinates: 29°18′17″N 51°02′20″E
- Country: Iran
- Province: Bushehr
- County: Dashtestan
- District: Central
- Rural District: Ziarat

Population (2016)
  - Total: 395
- Time zone: UTC+3:30 (IRST)

Bonar-e Ab-e Shirin (Persian: بناراب شيرين) (Note: Also romanized as Bonār Āb Shīrīn and Bonār-e Āb-e Shīrīn) is a village in Ziarat Rural District of the Central District in Dashtestan County, Bushehr province, Iran.

== Demographics ==
=== Population ===
At the time of the 2006 National Census, the village's population was 489 in 111 households. The following census in 2011 counted 426 people in 117 households. The 2016 census measured the population of the village as 395 people in 120 households.
