= Deh Now, Dashtestan =

Village in Bushehr province, Iran

Deh Now Persian: ده نو
- Village
- Location within Iran
- Coordinates: 28°55′24″N 51°08′03″E
- Country: Iran
- Province: Bushehr
- County: Dashtestan
- District: Central
- Rural District: Ziarat

Population (2016)
  - Total: 171
- Time zone: UTC+3:30 (IRST)

Deh Now (Persian: ده نو) is a village in Ziarat Rural District of the Central District in Dashtestan County, Bushehr province, Iran.

== Demographics ==
=== Population ===
At the time of the 2006 National Census, the village's population was 176 in 39 households. The following census in 2011 counted 150 people in 42 households. The 2016 census measured the population of the village as 171 people in 52 households.
