= Deh Qaed =

Village in Bushehr province, Iran

Deh Qaed Persian: دهقايد
- Village
- Location within Iran
- Coordinates: 29°17′55″N 51°11′41″E
- Country: Iran
- Province: Bushehr
- County: Dashtestan
- District: Central
- Rural District: Dalaki

Population (2016)
  - Total: 7,509
- Time zone: UTC+3:30 (IRST)

Deh Qaed (Persian: دهقايد) (Note: Also romanized as Deh Qā‘ed and Deh Qā’ed) is a village in Dalaki Rural District of the Central District in Dashtestan County, Bushehr province, Iran.

== Demographics ==
=== Population ===
At the time of the 2006 National Census, the village's population was 6,271 in 1,374 households. The following census in 2011 counted 7,083 people in 1,854 households. The 2016 census measured the population of the village as 7,509 people in 2,081 households. It was the most populous village in its rural district.
