= Ustung =

- Location in Tajikistan
- Coordinates: 39°18′N 69°13′E
- Country: Tajikistan
- Region: Sughd Region
- District: Kuhistoni Mastchoh District
- Official languages: Russian (Interethnic); Tajik (State)

Ustung is a village in Sughd Region, northwestern Tajikistan. It is part of the jamoat Ivan-Tojik in the Kuhistoni Mastchoh District.
