= Robat, North Khorasan =

Village in North Khorasan province, Iran

Robat Persian: رباط
- Village
- Location within Iran
- Coordinates: 37°54′24″N 57°41′58″E
- Country: Iran
- Province: North Khorasan
- County: Shirvan
- District: Qushkhaneh
- Rural District: Qushkhaneh-ye Pain

Population (2016)
  - Total: 1,027
- Time zone: UTC+3:30 (IRST)

Robat (Persian: رباط) (Note: Also romanized as Rebāt and Robāţ; also known as Ribāt) is a village in Qushkhaneh-ye Pain Rural District of Qushkhaneh District in Shirvan County, North Khorasan province, Iran.

== Demographics ==
=== Population ===
At the time of the 2006 National Census, the village's population was 1,148 in 257 households. The following census in 2011 counted 1,017 people in 303 households. The 2016 census measured the population of the village as 1,027 people in 307 households.
