= Senjed, North Khorasan =

Village in North Khorasan province, Iran

Senjed Persian: سنجد
- Village
- Location within Iran
- Coordinates: 37°47′36″N 57°33′26″E
- Country: Iran
- Province: North Khorasan
- County: Shirvan
- District: Qushkhaneh
- Rural District: Qushkhaneh-ye Pain

Population (2016)
  - Total: 1,135
- Time zone: UTC+3:30 (IRST)

Senjed (Persian: سنجد) is a village in Qushkhaneh-ye Pain Rural District of Qushkhaneh District in Shirvan County, North Khorasan province, Iran.

== Demographics ==
=== Population ===
At the time of the 2006 National Census, the village's population was 1,774 in 348 households. The following census in 2011 counted 1,421 people in 345 households. The 2016 census measured the population of the village as 1,135 people in 313 households, the most populous in its rural district.
