= Isvand =

Village in Bushehr province, Iran

Isvand Persian: عيسوند
- Village
- Location within Iran
- Coordinates: 29°09′06″N 51°05′53″E
- Country: Iran
- Province: Bushehr
- County: Dashtestan
- District: Central
- Rural District: Ziarat

Population (2016)
  - Total: 823
- Time zone: UTC+3:30 (IRST)

Isvand (Persian: عيسوند) (Note: Also romanized as ‘Īsavand, ‘Īsevand, and ‘Īsvand; also known as ‘Isāvandi and ‘Isīvand) is a village in Ziarat Rural District of the Central District in Dashtestan County, Bushehr province, Iran.

== Demographics ==
=== Population ===
At the time of the 2006 National Census, the village's population was 998 in 201 households. The following census in 2011 counted 918 people in 246 households. The 2016 census measured the population of the village as 823 people in 230 households.
