= Esizi Payan =

Esizi Poyon
- Location in Tajikistan
- Coordinates: 39°25′45″N 69°27′35″E
- Country: Tajikistan
- Region: Sughd Region
- District: Kuhistoni Mastchoh District
- Official languages: Russian (Interethnic); Tajik (State)

Esizi Poyon (Russian and Tajik: Эсизи Поён) is a village in Sughd Region, northwestern Tajikistan. It is part of the jamoat Ivan-Tojik in the Kuhistoni Mastchoh District.
