= Kheir Abad Hoomeh =

Kheir Abad Hoomeh (Persian: حومهخيراباد) may refer to:

- Kheyrabad, Anbarabad
- Kheyrabad, Yazd
