= Bagh, North Khorasan =

Village in North Khorasan province, Iran

Bagh Persian: باغ
- Village
- Location within Iran
- Coordinates: 37°46′41″N 57°47′08″E
- Country: Iran
- Province: North Khorasan
- County: Shirvan
- District: Qushkhaneh
- Rural District: Qushkhaneh-ye Bala

Population (2016)
  - Total: 346
- Time zone: UTC+3:30 (IRST)

Bagh (Persian: باغ) (Note: Also romanized as Bāgh) is a village in Qushkhaneh-ye Bala Rural District (Note: Formerly Qushkhaneh Rural District) of Qushkhaneh District in Shirvan County, North Khorasan province, Iran.

== Demographics ==
=== Population ===
At the time of the 2006 National Census, the village's population was 492 in 109 households. The following census in 2011 counted 328 people in 93 households. The 2016 census measured the population of the village as 346 people in 122 households.
