= Gandomriz, Bushehr =

Village in Bushehr province, Iran

Gandomriz Persian: گندم ريز
- Village
- Location within Iran
- Coordinates: 29°08′18″N 51°09′28″E
- Country: Iran
- Province: Bushehr
- County: Dashtestan
- District: Central
- Rural District: Howmeh

Population (2016)
  - Total: 110
- Time zone: UTC+3:30 (IRST)

Gandomriz (Persian: گندم ريز) (Note: Also romanized as Gandom Rīz, Gandomrīz, and Gandum Riz) is a village in Howmeh Rural District (Note: Formerly Khvosh Makan Rural District) of the Central District in Dashtestan County, Bushehr province, Iran.

== Demographics ==
=== Population ===
At the time of the 2006 National Census, the village's population was 121 in 23 households. The following census in 2011 counted 93 people in 27 households. The 2016 census measured the population of the village as 110 people in 31 households.
