= Sevali =

Sevali may refer to:

- Sevaldi, Iran
- Vaishali district, India
