= Gez Boland, Bushehr =

Village in Bushehr province, Iran

Gez Boland Persian: گزبلند
- Village
- Location within Iran
- Coordinates: 29°13′09″N 51°06′38″E
- Country: Iran
- Province: Bushehr
- County: Dashtestan
- District: Central
- Rural District: Howmeh

Population (2016)
  - Total: 541
- Time zone: UTC+3:30 (IRST)

Gez Boland (Persian: گزبلند) (Note: Also romanized as Gaz Boland) is a village in Howmeh Rural District (Note: Formerly Khvosh Makan Rural District) of the Central District in Dashtestan County, Bushehr province, Iran.

== Demographics ==
=== Population ===
At the time of the 2006 National Census, the village's population was 321 in 76 households. The following census in 2011 counted 466 people in 122 households. The 2016 census measured the population of the village as 541 people in 155 households.
