= Kakoli, North Khorasan =

Village in North Khorasan province, Iran

Kakoli Persian: كاكلي
- Village
- Location within Iran
- Coordinates: 37°45′10″N 57°51′45″E
- Country: Iran
- Province: North Khorasan
- County: Shirvan
- District: Qushkhaneh
- Rural District: Qushkhaneh-ye Bala

Population (2016)
  - Total: 390
- Time zone: UTC+3:30 (IRST)

Kakoli (Persian: كاكلي) (Note: Also romanized as Kākolī and Kakolī; also known as Kakol) is a village in Qushkhaneh-ye Bala Rural District (Note: Formerly Qushkhaneh Rural District) of Qushkhaneh District in Shirvan County, North Khorasan province, Iran.

== Demographics ==
=== Population ===
At the time of the 2006 National Census, the village's population was 507 in 104 households. The following census in 2011 counted 319 people in 92 households. The 2016 census measured the population of the village as 390 people in 138 households.
