= Qaraval Khaneh =

Village in Bushehr province, Iran

Qaraval Khaneh Persian: قراول‌خانه
- Village
- Location within Iran
- Coordinates: 29°22′02″N 51°16′15″E
- Country: Iran
- Province: Bushehr
- County: Dashtestan
- District: Central
- Rural District: Dalaki

Population (2016)
  - Total: 471
- Time zone: UTC+3:30 (IRST)

Qaraval Khaneh (Persian: قراول‌خانه) (Note: Also romanized as Qarāval Khāneh and Qarāvolkhāneh) is a village in Dalaki Rural District of the Central District in Dashtestan County, Bushehr province, Iran.

== Demographics ==
=== Population ===
At the time of the 2006 National Census, the village's population was 178 in 34 households. The following census in 2011 counted 351 people in 94 households. The 2016 census measured the population of the village as 471 people in 139 households.
