= Jonubgaz =

Village in Bushehr province, Iran

Jonubgaz Persian: جنوبگاز
- Village
- Country: Iran
- Province: Bushehr
- County: Dashtestan
- District: Central
- Rural District: Howmeh

Population (2016)
  - Total: 77
- Time zone: UTC+3:30 (IRST)

Jonubgaz (Persian: جنوبگاز) is a village in Howmeh Rural District (Note: Formerly Khvosh Makan Rural District) of the Central District in Dashtestan County, Bushehr province, Iran.

== Demographics ==
=== Population ===
The village did not appear in the 2006 and 2011 National Censuses. The 2016 census measured the population of the village as 77 people in 27 households.
