= Kalateh-ye Zaman =

Kalateh-ye Zaman or Kalatehzaman (Persian: كلاته زمان) may refer to:

- Kalateh-ye Zaman, North Khorasan
- Kalateh-ye Zaman, Razavi Khorasan
