= Qolhak-e Olya =

Village in North Khorasan province, Iran

Qolhak-e Olya Persian: قلهك عليا
- Village
- Location within Iran
- Coordinates: 37°47′54″N 57°44′05″E
- Country: Iran
- Province: North Khorasan
- County: Shirvan
- District: Qushkhaneh
- Rural District: Qushkhaneh-ye Bala

Population (2016)
  - Total: 418
- Time zone: UTC+3:30 (IRST)

Qolhak-e Olya (Persian: قلهك عليا) (Note: Also romanized as Qolhak-e ‘Olyā; also known as Qolhak-e Bālā) is a village in Qushkhaneh-ye Bala Rural District (Note: Formerly Qushkhaneh Rural District) of Qushkhaneh District in Shirvan County, North Khorasan province, Iran.

== Demographics ==
=== Population ===
At the time of the 2006 National Census, the village's population was 358 in 82 households. The following census in 2011 counted 184 people in 61 households. The 2016 census measured the population of the village as 418 people in 123 households.
