= Abol ol Firuz =

Village in Bushehr province, Iran

Abol ol Firuz Persian: ابوالفيروز
- Village
- Location within Iran
- Coordinates: 29°09′52″N 51°11′51″E
- Country: Iran
- Province: Bushehr
- County: Dashtestan
- District: Central
- Rural District: Howmeh

Population (2016)
  - Total: 347
- Time zone: UTC+3:30 (IRST)

Abol ol Firuz (Persian: ابوالفيروز) (Note: Also romanized as Abol ol Fīrūz; also known as Abol, Abol Firooz, Abū ol Fīrūz, and Labal) is a village in Howmeh Rural District (Note: Formerly Khvosh Makan Rural District) of the Central District in Dashtestan County, Bushehr province, Iran.

== Demographics ==
=== Population ===
At the time of the 2006 National Census, the village's population was 395 in 89 households. The following census in 2011 counted 318 people in 90 households. The 2016 census measured the population of the village as 347 people in 108 households.
