= Kulal =

Kulal may refer to:

- Mount Kulal, Kenya
- Kulal, Iran, a village in Bushehr Province, Iran
