= Khodgifi Bala =

Khudgifi Bolo
- Location in Tajikistan
- Coordinates: 39°26′58″N 70°01′24″E
- Country: Tajikistan
- Region: Sughd Region
- District: Kuhistoni Mastchoh District

Khudgifi Bolo (Tajik: Худгифи Боло) is a village in Sughd Region, northwestern Tajikistan. It is part of the jamoat Langar in the Kuhistoni Mastchoh District.
