= Zeydar =

Zeydar or Zaidar or Zidar (Persian: زيدر) may refer to:

- Zeydar, North Khorasan
- Zeydar, South Khorasan
