= Sardab, North Khorasan =

Village in North Khorasan province, Iran

Sardab Persian: سرداب
- Village
- Location within Iran
- Coordinates: 37°49′44″N 57°53′49″E
- Country: Iran
- Province: North Khorasan
- County: Shirvan
- District: Qushkhaneh
- Rural District: Qushkhaneh-ye Bala

Population (2016)
  - Total: 785
- Time zone: UTC+3:30 (IRST)

Sardab (Persian: سرداب) (Note: Also romanized as Sardāb) is a village in Qushkhaneh-ye Bala Rural District (Note: Formerly Qushkhaneh Rural District) of Qushkhaneh District in Shirvan County, North Khorasan province, Iran.

== Demographics ==
=== Population ===
At the time of the 2006 National Census, the village's population was 744 in 153 households. The following census in 2011 counted 736 people in 183 households. The 2016 census measured the population of the village as 785 people in 187 households, the most populous in its rural district.
