= Hadishahr, Tajikistan =

Hadishahr
- Location in Tajikistan
- Coordinates: 39°25′N 69°14′E
- Country: Tajikistan
- Region: Sughd Region
- District: Kuhistoni Mastchoh District

Hadishahr (Tajik: Ҳадишаҳр) is a village in Sughd Region, northwestern Tajikistan. It is part of the jamoat Ivan-Tojik in the Kuhistoni Mastchoh District.
