= Safiabad, Bushehr =

Village in Bushehr province, Iran

Safiabad Persian: صفي اباد
- Village
- Location within Iran
- Coordinates: 29°18′22″N 51°00′36″E
- Country: Iran
- Province: Bushehr
- County: Dashtestan
- District: Central
- Rural District: Ziarat

Population (2016)
  - Total: 49
- Time zone: UTC+3:30 (IRST)

Safiabad (Persian: صفي اباد) (Note: Also romanized as Şafīābād; also known as Sa‘īdābād and Seyfīābād) is a village in Ziarat Rural District of the Central District in Dashtestan County, Bushehr province, Iran.

== Demographics ==
=== Population ===
At the time of the 2006 National Census, the village's population was 90 in 19 households. The following census in 2011 counted 68 people in 18 households. The 2016 census measured the population of the village as 49 people in 14 households.
