= Boneh-ye Jaberi =

Village in Bushehr province, Iran

Boneh-ye Jaberi Persian: بنه جابري
- Village
- Location within Iran
- Coordinates: 29°21′58″N 51°14′11″E
- Country: Iran
- Province: Bushehr
- County: Dashtestan
- District: Central
- Rural District: Dalaki

Population (2016)
  - Total: 111
- Time zone: UTC+3:30 (IRST)

Boneh-ye Jaberi (Persian: بنه جابري) (Note: Also romanized as Boneh-ye Jāberī; also known as Jāberī) is a village in Dalaki Rural District of the Central District in Dashtestan County, Bushehr province, Iran.

== Demographics ==
=== Population ===
At the time of the 2006 National Census, the village's population was 113 in 19 households. The following census in 2011 counted 131 people in 34 households. The 2016 census measured the population of the village as 111 people in 34 households.
