= Dehmanara =

Dehmanora
- Location in Tajikistan
- Coordinates: 39°26′N 69°53′E
- Country: Tajikistan
- Region: Sughd Region
- District: Kuhistoni Mastchoh District

Dehmanora (Tajik: Деҳманора, also: Demnora) is a village in Sughd Region, northwestern Tajikistan. It is part of the jamoat Langar in the Kuhistoni Mastchoh District.
