= Khayrabad, Tajikistan =

Khayrobod may refer to the following places in Tajikistan:

- Khayrobod, Ayni District, a village in Ayni District, Sughd Region
- Khayrobod, Kuhistoni Mastchoh District, a village in Kuhistoni Mastchoh District, Sughd Region

== See also ==
- Khairabad (disambiguation)
- Kheyrabad (disambiguation)
