= Baregahi =

Village in Bushehr province, Iran

Baregahi Persian: بارگاهي
- Village
- Location within Iran
- Coordinates: 29°19′45″N 51°13′04″E
- Country: Iran
- Province: Bushehr
- County: Dashtestan
- District: Central
- Rural District: Dalaki

Population (2016)
  - Total: 295
- Time zone: UTC+3:30 (IRST)

Baregahi (Persian: بارگاهي) (Note: Also romanized as Bāregāhī and Bārgāhī; also known as Gāhī) is a village in Dalaki Rural District of the Central District in Dashtestan County, Bushehr province, Iran.

== Demographics ==
=== Population ===
At the time of the 2006 National Census, the village's population was 267 in 49 households. The following census in 2011 counted 264 people in 59 households. The 2016 census measured the population of the village as 295 people in 77 households.
