= Kahang, Iran =

Kahang or Kohang (Persian: كهنگ) in Iran may refer to:

- Kahang, Isfahan
- Kohang, Khuzestan
- Kahang, Sistan and Baluchestan
- Kahang, Tehran
