= Dehhisor =

- Location in Tajikistan
- Coordinates: 39°27′N 70°14′E
- Country: Tajikistan
- Region: Sughd Region
- District: Kuhistoni Mastchoh District

Dehhisor (Tajik: Деҳҳисор) is a village in Sughd Region, northwestern Tajikistan. It is part of the jamoat Langar in the Kuhistoni Mastchoh District.
