= Koruni =

Koruni (Persian: كروني) may refer to:

- Koruni, Kazerun
- Koruni, Marvdasht
- Koruni, Shiraz
