= Sar Korreh =

Village in Bushehr province, Iran

Sar Korreh Persian: سركره
- Village
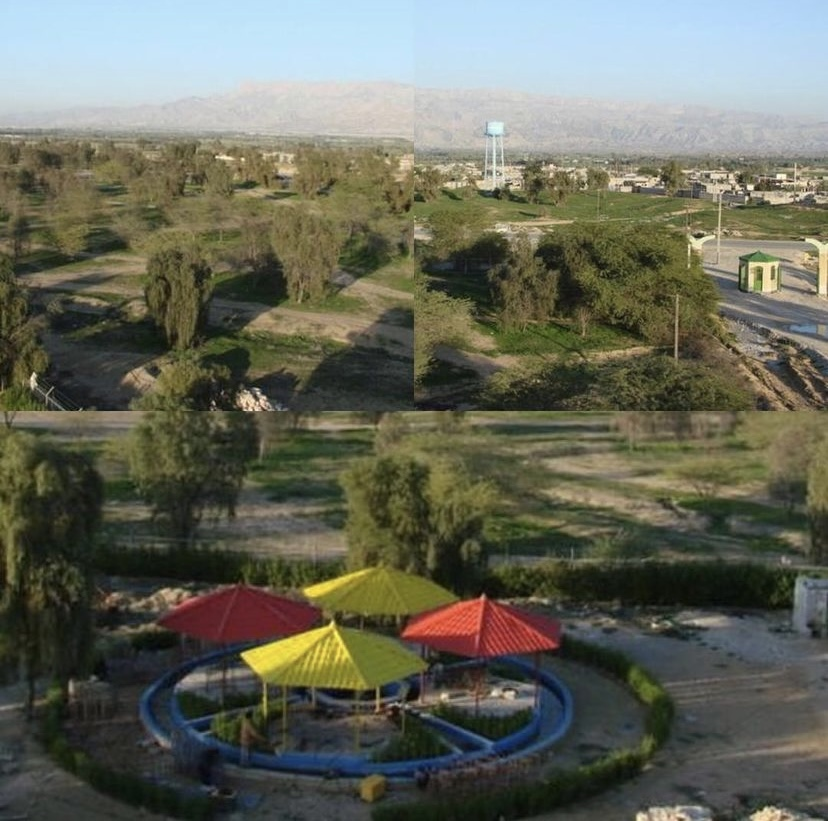
- Sar Korreh

- Location within Iran
- Coordinates: 29°11′43″N 51°12′34″E
- Country: Iran
- Province: Bushehr
- County: Dashtestan
- District: Central
- Rural District: Howmeh

Population (2016)
  - Total: 2,062
- Time zone: UTC+3:30 (IRST)

Sar Korreh (Persian: سركره) (Note: Also romanized as Sarkorreh; also known as Sar Kūreh and Sarkurreh) is a village in, and the capital of, Howmeh Rural District (Note: Formerly Khvosh Makan Rural District) in the Central District of Dashtestan County, Bushehr province, Iran. The previous capital of the rural district was the village of Khvosh Makan.

== Demographics ==
=== Population ===
At the time of the 2006 National Census, the village's population was 1,789 in 379 households. The following census in 2011 counted 1,742 people in 460 households. The 2016 census measured the population of the village as 2,062 people in 572 households.
