= Qaleh Sefid, Bushehr =

Village in Bushehr province, Iran

Qaleh Sefid Persian: قلعه سفيد
- Village
- Location within Iran
- Coordinates: 29°26′49″N 51°17′10″E
- Country: Iran
- Province: Bushehr
- County: Dashtestan
- District: Central
- Rural District: Dalaki

Population (2016)
  - Total: 1,883
- Time zone: UTC+3:30 (IRST)

Qaleh Sefid (Persian: قلعه سفيد) (Note: Also romanized as Qal‘eh Sefīd and Qal‘ehsefīd) is a village in Dalaki Rural District of the Central District in Dashtestan County, Bushehr province, Iran.

== Demographics ==
=== Population ===
At the time of the 2006 National Census, the village's population was 1,751 in 375 households. The following census in 2011 counted 1,968 people in 507 households. The 2016 census measured the population of the village as 1,883 people in 542 households.
