= Churchuri =

Village in North Khorasan province, Iran

Churchuri Persian: چورچوري
- Village
- Location within Iran
- Coordinates: 37°49′33″N 57°35′26″E
- Country: Iran
- Province: North Khorasan
- County: Shirvan
- District: Qushkhaneh
- Rural District: Qushkhaneh-ye Pain

Population (2016)
  - Total: 137
- Time zone: UTC+3:30 (IRST)

Churchuri (Persian: چورچوري) (Note: Also romanized as Chūrchūrī) is a village in Qushkhaneh-ye Pain Rural District of Qushkhaneh District in Shirvan County, North Khorasan province, Iran.

== Demographics ==
=== Population ===
At the time of the 2006 National Census, the village's population was 417 in 74 households. The following census in 2011 counted 231 people in 52 households. The 2016 census measured the population of the village as 137 people in 36 households.
