= Kalateh-ye Zaman, North Khorasan =

Kalateh-ye Zaman كلاته زمان
- Village
- Location within Iran
- Coordinates: 37°50′15″N 57°52′49″E
- Country: Iran
- Province: North Khorasan
- County: Shirvan
- Bakhsh: Qushkhaneh
- Rural District: Qushkhaneh-ye Bala

Population (2006)
  - Total: 210
- Time zone: UTC+3:30 (IRST)
  - Summer (DST): UTC+4:30 (IRDT)

Kalateh-ye Zaman (Persian: كلاته زمان, also Romanized as Kalāteh-ye Zamān) is a village in Qushkhaneh-ye Bala Rural District, Qushkhaneh District, Shirvan County, North Khorasan Province, Iran. At the 2006 census, its population was 210, in 43 families.
