= Halva Cheshmeh =

Village in North Khorasan province, Iran

Halva Cheshmeh Persian: حلواچشمه
- Village
- Location within Iran
- Coordinates: 37°47′50″N 57°40′46″E
- Country: Iran
- Province: North Khorasan
- County: Shirvan
- District: Qushkhaneh
- Rural District: Qushkhaneh-ye Pain

Population (2016)
  - Total: 426
- Time zone: UTC+3:30 (IRST)

Halva Cheshmeh (Persian: حلواچشمه) (Note: Also romanized as Ḩalvā Cheshmeh) is a village in Qushkhaneh-ye Pain Rural District of Qushkhaneh District in Shirvan County, North Khorasan province, Iran.

== Demographics ==
=== Population ===
At the time of the 2006 National Census, the village's population was 463 in 106 households. The following census in 2011 counted 433 people in 117 households. The 2016 census measured the population of the village as 426 people in 125 households.
