= Rahdar, Dashtestan =

Village in Bushehr province, Iran

Rahdar Persian: راهدار
- Village
- Location within Iran
- Coordinates: 29°20′11″N 51°15′49″E
- Country: Iran
- Province: Bushehr
- County: Dashtestan
- District: Central
- Rural District: Dalaki

Population (2016)
  - Total: 1,574
- Time zone: UTC+3:30 (IRST)

Rahdar (Persian: راهدار) (Note: Also romanized as Rāhdār) is a village in Dalaki Rural District of the Central District in Dashtestan County, Bushehr province, Iran.

== Demographics ==
=== Population ===
At the time of the 2006 National Census, the village's population was 1,454 in 305 households. The following census in 2011 counted 1,520 people in 351 households. The 2016 census measured the population of the village as 1,574 people in 416 households.
