= Sarani, Iran =

Village in North Khorasan province, Iran

Sarani Persian: سراني
- Village
- Location within Iran
- Coordinates: 37°48′26″N 57°56′47″E
- Country: Iran
- Province: North Khorasan
- County: Shirvan
- District: Qushkhaneh
- Rural District: Qushkhaneh-ye Bala

Population (2016)
  - Total: 327
- Time zone: UTC+3:30 (IRST)

Sarani (Persian: سراني) (Note: Also romanized as Sarānī) is a village in Qushkhaneh-ye Bala Rural District (Note: Formerly Qushkhaneh Rural District) of Qushkhaneh District in Shirvan County, North Khorasan province, Iran.

== Demographics ==
=== Population ===
At the time of the 2006 National Census, the village's population was 403 in 98 households. The following census in 2011 counted 337 people in 94 households. The 2016 census measured the population of the village as 327 people in 94 households.
