= Hesar, North Khorasan =

Village in North Khorasan province, Iran

Hesar Persian: حصار
- Village
- Location within Iran
- Coordinates: 37°44′51″N 57°40′17″E
- Country: Iran
- Province: North Khorasan
- County: Shirvan
- District: Qushkhaneh
- Rural District: Qushkhaneh-ye Bala

Population (2016)
  - Total: 344
- Time zone: UTC+3:30 (IRST)

Hesar (Persian: حصار) (Note: Also romanized as Ḩeşār) is a village in Qushkhaneh-ye Bala Rural District (Note: Formerly Qushkhaneh Rural District) of Qushkhaneh District in Shirvan County, North Khorasan province, Iran.

== Demographics ==
=== Population ===
At the time of the 2006 National Census, the village's population was 391 in 84 households. The following census in 2011 counted 347 people in 85 households. The 2016 census measured the population of the village as 344 people in 104 households.
