= Ziarat, Dashtestan =

Village in Bushehr province, Iran

Ziarat Persian: زيارت
- Village
- Location within Iran
- Coordinates: 29°16′53″N 51°04′16″E
- Country: Iran
- Province: Bushehr
- County: Dashtestan
- District: Central
- Rural District: Ziarat

Population (2016)
  - Total: 2,758
- Time zone: UTC+3:30 (IRST)

Ziarat (Persian: زيارت) (Note: Also romanized as Zeyārāt, Zīārat, and Zīyārat) is a village in, and the capital of, Ziarat Rural District in the Central District of Dashtestan County, Bushehr province, Iran.

== Demographics ==
=== Population ===
At the time of the 2006 National Census, the village's population was 2,903 in 668 households. The following census in 2011 counted 3,027 people in 833 households. The 2016 census measured the population of the village as 2,758 people in 859 households. It was the most populous village in its rural district.
