= Bondaruz =

Village in Bushehr province, Iran

Bondaruz Persian: بنداروز
- Village
- Location within Iran
- Coordinates: 29°13′32″N 51°12′47″E
- Country: Iran
- Province: Bushehr
- County: Dashtestan
- District: Central
- Rural District: Howmeh

Population (2016)
  - Total: 3,724
- Time zone: UTC+3:30 (IRST)

Bondaruz (Persian: بنداروز) (Note: Also romanized as Bandārūz and Bondārūz) is a village in Howmeh Rural District (Note: Formerly Khvosh Makan Rural District) of the Central District in Dashtestan County, Bushehr province, Iran.

== Demographics ==
=== Population ===
At the time of the 2006 National Census, the village's population was 1,764 in 392 households. The following census in 2011 counted 2,933 people in 535 households. The 2016 census measured the population of the village as 3,724 people in 751 households. It was the most populous village in its rural district.
