= Hasanabad, Bushehr =

Village in Bushehr province, Iran

Hasanabad Persian: حسن‌آباد
- Village
- Location within Iran
- Coordinates: 29°12′46″N 51°12′26″E
- Country: Iran
- Province: Bushehr
- County: Dashtestan
- District: Central
- Rural District: Howmeh

Population (2016)
  - Total: 141
- Time zone: UTC+3:30 (IRST)

Hasanabad (Persian: حسن‌آباد) (Note: also romanized as Ḩasanābād; also known as Ḩoseynābād and Qanāt-e Ḩājjī Ḩasan) is a village in Howmeh Rural District (Note: Formerly Khvosh Makan Rural District) of the Central District in Dashtestan County, Bushehr province, Iran.

== Demographics ==
=== Population ===
At the time of the 2006 National Census, the village's population was 67 in 11 households. The following census in 2011 counted 97 people in 24 households. The 2016 census measured the population of the village as 141 people in 42 households.
