= Direh =

Direh (Persian: ديره) may refer to:

- Direh, North Khorasan
- Direh Rural District, in Kermanshah Province
