= Chah Khani =

Village in Bushehr province, Iran

Chah Khani Persian: چاه خاني
- Village
- Location within Iran
- Coordinates: 29°11′45″N 51°06′17″E
- Country: Iran
- Province: Bushehr
- County: Dashtestan
- District: Central
- Rural District: Ziarat

Population (2016)
  - Total: 1,784
- Time zone: UTC+3:30 (IRST)

Chah Khani (Persian: چاه خاني) (Note: Also romanized as Chāh Khānī) is a village in Ziarat Rural District of the Central District in Dashtestan County, Bushehr province, Iran.

== Demographics ==
=== Population ===
At the time of the 2006 National Census, the village's population was 1,487 in 333 households. The following census in 2011 counted 1,610 people in 439 households. The 2016 census measured the population of the village as 1,784 people in 479 households.
