= Langar, Kuhistoni Mastchoh =

Langar
- Village and Jamoat
- Location in Tajikistan
- Coordinates: 39°27′N 69°33′E
- Country: Tajikistan
- Region: Sughd Region
- District: Kuhistoni Mastchoh District

Population (2015)
  - Total: 9,666
- Time zone: UTC+5 (TJT)

Langar (Tajik: Лангар) is a village and jamoat in north-west Tajikistan. It is located in Kuhistoni Mastchoh District in Sughd Region. The jamoat has a total population of 9,666 (2015). It consists of 15 villages, including Madrushkat (the seat), Langar, Dehhisor, Dehmanora, Khayrobod and Khudgifi Bolo.
