= Marbin, Iran =

Village in Isfahan province, Iran

Marbin Persian: ماربين
- Village
- Location within Iran
- Coordinates: 33°05′26″N 52°24′15″E
- Country: Iran
- Province: Isfahan
- County: Ardestan
- District: Central
- Rural District: Barzavand

Population (2016)
  - Total: 118
- Time zone: UTC+3:30 (IRST)

Marbin (Persian: ماربين) (Note: Also romanized as Mārbīn) is a village in Barzavand Rural District of the Central District in Ardestan County, Isfahan province, Iran.

== Demographics ==
=== Population ===
At the time of the 2006 National Census, the village's population was 206 in 72 households. The following census in 2011 counted 107 people in 53 households. The 2016 census measured the population of the village as 118 people in 56 households.
