= Qahsareh =

Village in Isfahan province, Iran

Qahsareh Persian: قهساره
- Village
- Location within Iran
- Coordinates: 33°01′26″N 52°26′06″E
- Country: Iran
- Province: Isfahan
- County: Ardestan
- District: Central
- Rural District: Barzavand

Population (2016)
  - Total: 129
- Time zone: UTC+3:30 (IRST)

Qahsareh (Persian: قهساره) (Note: Also romanized as Qahsāreh and Qehsāreh; also known as ‘Alīābād-e Qahsāreh) is a village in Barzavand Rural District of the Central District in Ardestan County, Isfahan province, Iran.

== Demographics ==
=== Population ===
At the time of the 2006 National Census, the village's population was 230 in 96 households. The following census in 2011 counted 159 people in 68 households. The 2016 census measured the population of the village as 129 people in 58 households.
