= Nohuj =

Village in Isfahan province, Iran

Nohuj Persian: نهوج
- Village
- Location within Iran
- Coordinates: 32°56′51″N 52°34′35″E
- Country: Iran
- Province: Isfahan
- County: Ardestan
- District: Central
- Rural District: Barzavand

Population (2016)
  - Total: 224
- Time zone: UTC+3:30 (IRST)

Nohuj (Persian: نهوج) (Note: Also romanized as Nahūj and Nohūj) is a village in Barzavand Rural District of the Central District in Ardestan County, Isfahan province, Iran.

== Demographics ==
=== Population ===
At the time of the 2006 National Census, the village's population was 572 in 178 households. The following census in 2011 counted 302 people in 119 households. The 2016 census measured the population of the village as 224 people in 93 households.
