= Borzelan-e Sofla =

Village in North Khorasan province, Iran

Borzelan-e Sofla Persian: برزلان سفلي
- Village
- Location within Iran
- Coordinates: 37°47′15″N 57°38′56″E
- Country: Iran
- Province: North Khorasan
- County: Shirvan
- District: Qushkhaneh
- Rural District: Qushkhaneh-ye Pain

Population (2016)
  - Total: 105
- Time zone: UTC+3:30 (IRST)

Borzelan-e Sofla (Persian: برزلان سفلي) (Note: Also romanized as Borzelān-e Soflá; also known as Borzelān-e Pā’īn) is a village in Qushkhaneh-ye Pain Rural District of Qushkhaneh District in Shirvan County, North Khorasan province, Iran.

== Demographics ==
=== Population ===
At the time of the 2006 National Census, the village's population was 163 in 32 households. The following census in 2011 counted 130 people in 34 households. The 2016 census measured the population of the village as 105 people in 32 households.
