= Neysian =

Village in Isfahan province, Iran

Neysian Persian: نيسيان
- Village
- Location within Iran
- Coordinates: 32°59′29″N 52°28′15″E
- Country: Iran
- Province: Isfahan
- County: Ardestan
- District: Central
- Rural District: Barzavand

Population (2016)
  - Total: 1,369
- Time zone: UTC+3:30 (IRST)

Neysian (Persian: نيسيان) (Note: Also romanized as Neysīān and Neysīyān; also known as Naistān and Neysoyān) is a village in, and the capital of, Barzavand Rural District in the Central District of Ardestan County, Isfahan province, Iran.

== Demographics ==
=== Population ===
At the time of the 2006 National Census, the village's population was 1,097 in 394 households. The following census in 2011 counted 1,167 people in 427 households. The 2016 census measured the population of the village as 1,369 people in 480 households, the most populous in its rural district.
