= Dalaki =

City in Bushehr province, Iran

Dalaki Persian: دالکی
- City
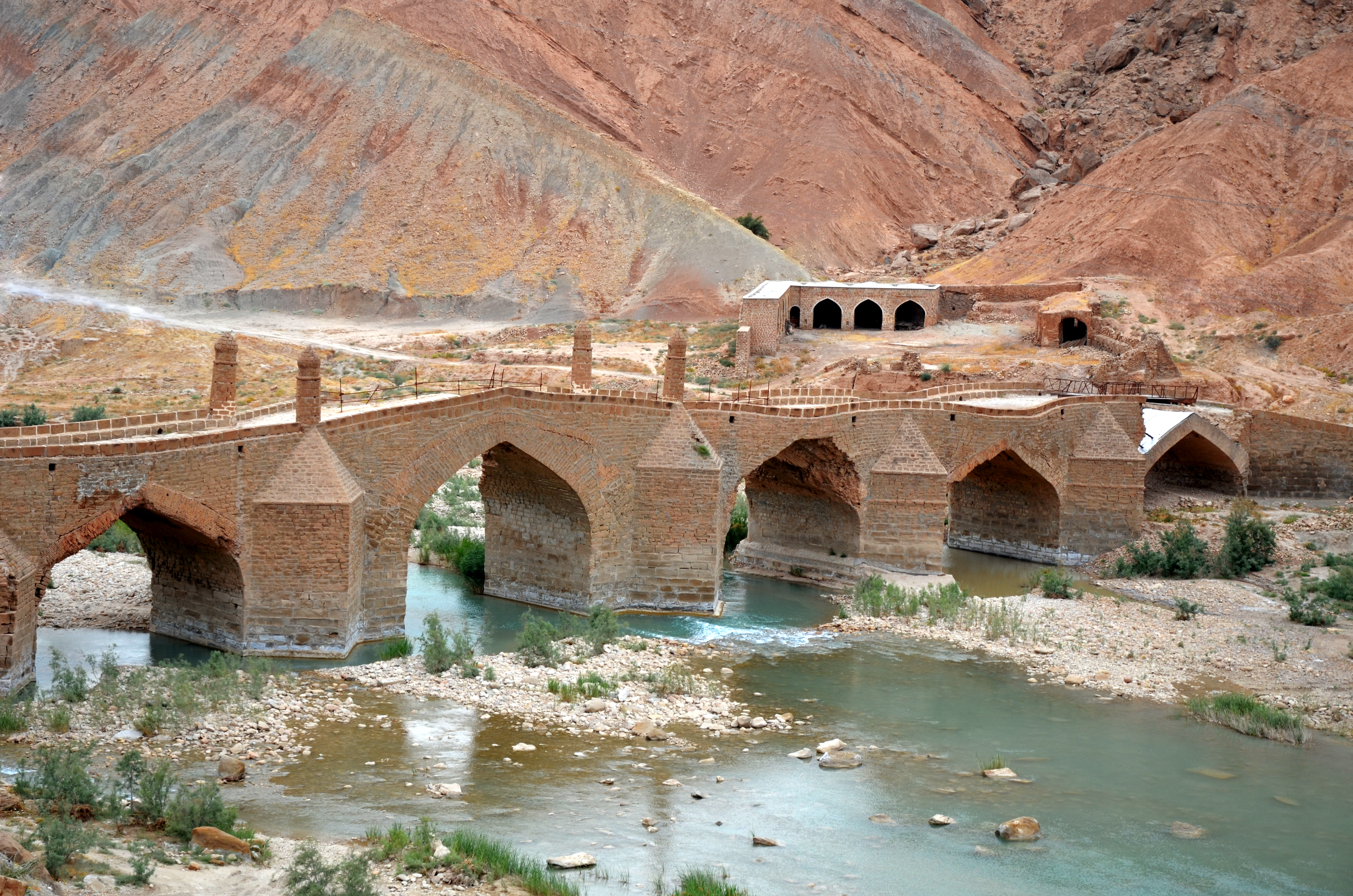

- Location within Iran
- Coordinates: 29°25′56″N 51°17′42″E
- Country: Iran
- Province: Bushehr
- County: Dashtestan
- District: Central
- Established as a city: 1999

Population (2016)
  - Total: 6,436
- Time zone: UTC+3:30 (IRST)

Dalaki (Persian: دالکی) (Note: Also romanized as Dālakī; also known as Daliki) is a city in the Central District of Dashtestan County, Bushehr province, Iran, serving as the administrative center for Dalaki Rural District. The village of Dalaki was converted to a city in 1999.

== Demographics ==
=== Population ===
At the time of the 2006 National Census, the city's population was 7,861 in 1,637 households. The following census in 2011 counted 6,044 people in 1,511 households. The 2016 census measured the population of the city as 6,436 people in 1,846 households.
