= Dalaki Rural District =

Rural district in Bushehr province, Iran

Dalaki Rural District Persian: دهستان دالكي
- Rural District
- Location within Iran
- Coordinates: 29°23′N 51°19′E
- Country: Iran
- Province: Bushehr
- County: Dashtestan
- District: Central
- Established: 1987
- Capital: Dalaki

Population (2016)
  - Total: 12,208
- Time zone: UTC+3:30 (IRST)

Dalaki Rural District (Persian: دهستان دالكي) is in the Central District of Dashtestan County, Bushehr province, Iran. It is administered from the city of Dalaki.

== Demographics ==
=== Population ===
At the time of the 2006 National Census, the rural district's population was 10,490 in 2,237 households. There were 11,761 inhabitants in 3,007 households at the following census of 2011. The 2016 census measured the population of the rural district as 12,208 in 3,394 households. The most populous of its 15 villages was Deh Qaed, with 7,509 people.

=== Other villages in the rural district ===
- Baregahi
- Boneh-ye Jaberi
- Kheyrabad
- Qaleh Sefid
- Qaraval Khaneh
- Rahdar
