= Pireh, Shirvan =

Village in North Khorasan province, Iran

Pireh Persian: پيره
- Village
- Location within Iran
- Coordinates: 37°46′16″N 57°38′48″E
- Country: Iran
- Province: North Khorasan
- County: Shirvan
- District: Qushkhaneh
- Rural District: Qushkhaneh-ye Pain

Population (2016)
  - Total: 130
- Time zone: UTC+3:30 (IRST)

Pireh (Persian: پيره) (Note: Also romanized as Pīreh; also known as Dīreh) is a village in Qushkhaneh-ye Pain Rural District of Qushkhaneh District in Shirvan County, North Khorasan province, Iran.

== Demographics ==
=== Population ===
At the time of the 2006 National Census, the village's population was 186 in 38 households. The following census in 2011 counted 117 people in 33 households. The 2016 census measured the population of the village as 130 people in 38 households.
