= Khairpur (disambiguation) =

Khairpur is a city in Sindh, Pakistan.

Khairpur may refer to:

- Khairpur District, in Sindh, Pakistan, which has Khairpur city as its capital
  - Khairpur Division, a former administrative division of West Pakistan
  - Khairpur (princely state), a former state of British India
- Khairpur, Badin, a village in Sindh, Pakistan
- Khairpur, Chakwal, a village in Punjab, Pakistan

== See also ==
- Khairabad (disambiguation)
- Khayerpur Assembly constituency, in Tripura, India
