= Ziarat Rural District (Dashtestan County) =

Rural district in Bushehr province, Iran

Ziarat Rural District Persian: دهستان زيارت
- Rural District
- Location within Iran
- Coordinates: 29°14′N 51°05′E
- Country: Iran
- Province: Bushehr
- County: Dashtestan
- District: Central
- Established: 1991
- Capital: Ziarat

Population (2016)
  - Total: 6,646
- Time zone: UTC+3:30 (IRST)

Ziarat Rural District (Persian: دهستان زيارت) is in the Central District of Dashtestan County, Bushehr province, Iran. Its capital is the village of Ziarat.

== Demographics ==
=== Population ===
At the time of the 2006 National Census, the rural district's population was 6,881 in 1,525 households. There were 6,932 inhabitants in 1,875 households at the following census of 2011. The 2016 census measured the population of the rural district as 6,646 in 1,939 households. The most populous of its 11 villages was Ziarat, with 2,758 people.

=== Other villages in the rural district ===
- Bonar-e Ab-e Shirin
- Chah Khani
- Deh Now
- Isvand
- Kolol
- Safiabad
