= Borzelan-e Olya =

Village in North Khorasan province, Iran

Borzelan-e Olya Persian: برزلان عليا
- Village
- Location within Iran
- Coordinates: 37°47′40″N 57°38′47″E
- Country: Iran
- Province: North Khorasan
- County: Shirvan
- District: Qushkhaneh
- Rural District: Qushkhaneh-ye Pain

Population (2016)
  - Total: 393
- Time zone: UTC+3:30 (IRST)

Borzelan-e Olya (Persian: برزلان عليا) (Note: Also romanized as Borzelān-e ‘Olyā; also known as Borzelān-e Bālā, Borzolān, and Borzolān-e Bālā) is a village in Qushkhaneh-ye Pain Rural District of Qushkhaneh District in Shirvan County, North Khorasan province, Iran.

== Demographics ==
=== Population ===
At the time of the 2006 National Census, the village's population was 769 in 155 households. The following census in 2011 counted 534 people in 126 households. The 2016 census measured the population of the village as 393 people in 110 households.
