= Barzavand Rural District =

Rural district in Isfahan province, Iran

Barzavand Rural District Persian: دهستان برزاوند
- Rural District
- Location within Iran
- Coordinates: 33°01′N 52°30′E
- Country: Iran
- Province: Isfahan
- County: Ardestan
- District: Central
- Established: 1987
- Capital: Neysian

Population (2016)
  - Total: 2,972
- Time zone: UTC+3:30 (IRST)

Barzavand Rural District (Persian: دهستان برزاوند) is in the Central District of Ardestan County, Isfahan province, Iran. Its capital is the village of Neysian.

== Demographics ==
=== Population ===
At the time of the 2006 National Census, the rural district's population was 3,943 in 1,324 households. There were 2,937 inhabitants in 1,121 households at the following census of 2011. The 2016 census measured the population of the rural district as 2,972 in 1,161 households. The most populous of its 32 villages was Neysian, with 1,369 people.

=== Other villages in the rural district ===
- Faran
- Kahang
- Kheyrabad
- Marbin
- Nohuj
- Qahsareh
