= Qushkhaneh, Shirvan =

City in North Khorasan province, Iran

Qushkhaneh Persian: قوشخانه
- City
- Location within Iran
- Coordinates: 37°44′45″N 57°43′24″E
- Country: Iran
- Province: North Khorasan
- County: Shirvan
- District: Qushkhaneh
- Established as a city: 2012

Population (2016)
  - Total: 996
- Time zone: UTC+3:30 (IRST)

Qushkhaneh (Persian: قوشخانه) (Note: Formerly known as Yengi Qaleh-ye Bala (ينگي قلعه بالا), also romanized as Yengī Qal‘eh-ye Bālā and Yangī Qal‘eh-ye Bālā; also known as Yangī Qal‘eh, Yengī Qaleh, and Yengī Qal‘eh-ye ‘Olyā) is a city in, and the capital of, Qushkhaneh District in Shirvan County, North Khorasan province, Iran. It also serves as the administrative center for Qushkhaneh-ye Bala Rural District. (Note: Formerly Qushkhaneh Rural District)

== Demographics ==
=== Population ===
At the time of the 2006 National Census, the population was 862 in 218 households, when it was the village of Yengi Qaleh-ye Bala (Note: Renamed Qushkhaneh) in Qushkhaneh-ye Bala Rural District. The following census in 2011 counted 927 people in 256 households. The 2016 census measured the population as 996 people in 290 households, by which time Yengi Qaleh-ye Bala had been converted to a city as Qushkhaneh.
