= Howmeh Rural District (Dashtestan County) =

Rural district in Bushehr province, Iran

Howmeh Rural District Persian: دهستان حومه
- Rural District
- Location within Iran
- Coordinates: 29°13′N 51°15′E
- Country: Iran
- Province: Bushehr
- County: Dashtestan
- District: Central
- Established: 1987
- Capital: Sar Korreh

Population (2016)
  - Total: 9,603
- Time zone: UTC+3:30 (IRST)

Howmeh Rural District (Persian: دهستان حومه) (Note: Formerly Khvosh Makan Rural District (دهستان خوشمکان)) is in the Central District of Dashtestan County, Bushehr province, Iran. Its capital is the village of Sar Korreh. The previous capital of the rural district was the village of Khvosh Makan.

== Demographics ==
=== Population ===
At the time of the 2006 National Census, the rural district's population was 6,838 in 1,500 households. There were 8,148 inhabitants in 1,929 households at the following census of 2011. The 2016 census measured the population of the rural district as 9,603 in 2,405 households. The most populous of its 14 villages was Bondaruz, with 3,724 people.

=== Other villages in the rural district ===
- Abol ol Firuz
- Gandomriz
- Gez Boland
- Hasanabad
- Jonubgaz
- Khvosh Ab
- Neynizak
