= Zeydar, North Khorasan =

Village in North Khorasan province, Iran

Zeydar Persian: زيدر
- Village
- Location within Iran
- Coordinates: 37°51′15″N 57°45′55″E
- Country: Iran
- Province: North Khorasan
- County: Shirvan
- District: Qushkhaneh
- Rural District: Qushkhaneh-ye Bala

Population (2016)
  - Total: 521
- Time zone: UTC+3:30 (IRST)

Zeydar (Persian: زيدر) (Note: Also romanized as v; also known as Zaidar) is a village in Qushkhaneh-ye Bala Rural District (Note: Formerly Qushkhaneh Rural District) of Qushkhaneh District in Shirvan County, North Khorasan province, Iran.

== Demographics ==
=== Language ===
The local language is Turkmen.

=== Population ===
At the time of the 2006 National Census, the village's population was 727 in 152 households. The following census in 2011 counted 640 people in 176 households. The 2016 census measured the population of the village as 521 people in 164 households.
