= Khayrabad, Kuhistoni Mastchoh District =

Khayrobod
- Location in Tajikistan
- Coordinates: 39°25′N 69°31′E
- Country: Tajikistan
- Region: Sughd Region
- District: Kuhistoni Mastchoh District

Khayrobod (Tajik: Хайробод) is a village in Sughd Region, northern Tajikistan. It is part of the jamoat Langar in the Kuhistoni Mastchoh District.
