= Shanaqi-ye Sofla =

Village in North Khorasan province, Iran

Shanaqi-ye Sofla Persian: شناقي سفلي
- Village
- Location within Iran
- Coordinates: 37°47′03″N 57°36′14″E
- Country: Iran
- Province: North Khorasan
- County: Shirvan
- District: Qushkhaneh
- Rural District: Qushkhaneh-ye Pain

Population (2016)
  - Total: 212
- Time zone: UTC+3:30 (IRST)

Shanaqi-ye Sofla (Persian: شناقي سفلي) (Note: Also romanized as Shanāqī-ye Soflá and Shenaqi Soflá; also known as Shanāqī-ye Pā’īn, Shanqī-ye Pā’īn, and Shenāqī) is a village in Qushkhaneh-ye Pain Rural District of Qushkhaneh District in Shirvan County, North Khorasan province, Iran.

== Demographics ==
=== Population ===
At the time of the 2006 National Census, the village's population was 462 in 95 households. The following census in 2011 counted 378 people in 95 households. The 2016 census measured the population of the village as 212 people in 66 households.
