= Shanaqi-ye Olya =

Village in North Khorasan province, Iran

Shanaqi-ye Olya Persian: شناقي سفلي
- Village
- Location within Iran
- Coordinates: 37°49′55″N 57°43′08″E
- Country: Iran
- Province: North Khorasan
- County: Shirvan
- District: Qushkhaneh
- Rural District: Qushkhaneh-ye Pain

Population (2016)
  - Total: 85
- Time zone: UTC+3:30 (IRST)

Shanaqi-ye Olya (Persian: شناقي عليا) (Note: Also romanized as Shanāqī-ye ‘Olyā; also known as Shanāqī-ye Bālā) is a village in Qushkhaneh-ye Pain Rural District of Qushkhaneh District in Shirvan County, North Khorasan province, Iran.

== Demographics ==
=== Population ===
At the time of the 2006 National Census, the village's population was 151 in 33 households. The following census in 2011 counted 86 people in 24 households. The 2016 census measured the population of the village as 85 people in 21 households.
