= Faran, Iran =

Village in Isfahan province, Iran

Faran Persian: فران
- Village
- Location within Iran
- Coordinates: 32°59′22″N 52°37′26″E
- Country: Iran
- Province: Isfahan
- County: Ardestan
- District: Central
- Rural District: Barzavand

Population (2016)
  - Total: 73
- Time zone: UTC+3:30 (IRST)

Faran (Persian: فران) (Note: Also romanized as Farān and Ferān; also known as Harān and Horūn) is a village in Barzavand Rural District of the Central District in Ardestan County, Isfahan province, Iran.

== Demographics ==
=== Population ===
At the time of the 2006 National Census, the village's population was 62 in 21 households. The following census in 2011 counted 31 people in 17 households. The 2016 census measured the population of the village as 73 people in 29 households.
