= Sevaldi =

Village in North Khorasan province, Iran

Sevaldi Persian: سولدي
- Village
- Location within Iran
- Coordinates: 37°42′16″N 57°47′59″E
- Country: Iran
- Province: North Khorasan
- County: Shirvan
- District: Qushkhaneh
- Rural District: Qushkhaneh-ye Bala

Population (2016)
  - Total: 359
- Time zone: UTC+3:30 (IRST)

Sevaldi (Persian: سولدي) (Note: Also romanized as Savaldi, Savaldī, and Sevaldī; also known as Barzan, Sāldī, Seh Baleh, Sevalī, Sovalde, and Sūlvī) is a village in Qushkhaneh-ye Bala Rural District (Note: Formerly Qushkhaneh Rural District) of Qushkhaneh District in Shirvan County, North Khorasan province, Iran.

== Demographics ==
=== Population ===
At the time of the 2006 National Census, the village's population was 615 in 152 households. The following census in 2011 counted 607 people in 149 households. The 2016 census measured the population of the village as 359 people in 109 households.
