= Qushkhaneh-ye Pain Rural District =

Rural district in North Khorasan province, Iran

Qushkhaneh-ye Pain Rural District Persian: دهستان قوشخانه پايين
- Rural District
- Location within Iran
- Coordinates: 37°48′N 57°37′E
- Country: Iran
- Province: North Khorasan
- County: Shirvan
- District: Qushkhaneh
- Established: 2006
- Capital: Qaleh-ye Ali Mohammad

Population (2016)
  - Total: 4,157
- Time zone: UTC+3:30 (IRST)

Qushkhaneh-ye Pain Rural District (Persian: دهستان قوشخانه پايين) is in Qushkhaneh District of Shirvan County, North Khorasan province, Iran. Its capital is the village of Qaleh-ye Ali Mohammad.

== Demographics ==
=== Population ===
At the time of the 2006 National Census, the rural district's population was 5,771 in 1,194 households. There were 4,896 inhabitants in 1,290 households at the following census of 2011. The 2016 census measured the population of the rural district as 4,157 in 1,202 households. The most populous of its 11 villages was Senjed, with 1,135 people.

=== Other villages in the rural district ===
- Borzelan-e Olya
- Borzelan-e Sofla
- Churchuri
- Halva Cheshmeh
- Jangah
- Pireh
- Robat
- Shanaqi-ye Olya
- Shanaqi-ye Sofla
