= Kheyrabad, Bushehr =

Village in Bushehr province, Iran

Kheyrabad Persian: خيراباد
- Village
- Location within Iran
- Coordinates: 29°23′23″N 51°15′20″E
- Country: Iran
- Province: Bushehr
- County: Dashtestan
- District: Central
- Rural District: Dalaki

Population (2016)
  - Total: 364
- Time zone: UTC+3:30 (IRST)

Kheyrabad (Persian: خيراباد) (Note: Also romanized as Kheyrābād) is a village in Dalaki Rural District of the Central District in Dashtestan County, Bushehr province, Iran.

== Demographics ==
=== Population ===
At the time of the 2006 National Census, the village's population was 441 in 79 households. The following census in 2011 counted 444 people in 108 households. The 2016 census measured the population of the village as 364 people in 104 households.
