= Kheyrabad, Jask =

Kheyrabad خيرآباد
- Village
- Country: Iran
- Province: Hormozgan
- County: Jask
- Bakhsh: Central
- Rural District: Jask

Population (2006)
  - Total: 75
- Time zone: UTC+3:30 (IRST)
  - Summer (DST): UTC+4:30 (IRDT)

Kheyrabad (Persian: خيرآباد, also Romanized as Kheyrābād) is a village in Jask Rural District, in the Central District of Jask County, Hormozgan Province, Iran. At the 2006 census, its population was 75, in 15 families.
