= Kheyrabad, Mashhad =

Kheyrabad خيراباد
- Village
- Location within Iran
- Coordinates: 36°18′52″N 59°52′17″E
- Country: Iran
- Province: Razavi Khorasan
- County: Mashhad
- Bakhsh: Central
- Rural District: Kenevist

Population (2006)
  - Total: 645
- Time zone: UTC+3:30 (IRST)
  - Summer (DST): UTC+4:30 (IRDT)

Kheyrabad (Persian: خيراباد, also Romanized as Kheyrābād) is a village in Kenevist Rural District, in the Central District of Mashhad County, Razavi Khorasan Province, Iran. At the 2006 census, its population was 645, in 154 families.
