= Tazehabad-e Qaragol =

Tazehabad-e Qaragol تازه‌آباد قراگل
- Village
- Location within Iran
- Coordinates: 35°28′14″N 47°06′53″E
- Country: Iran
- Province: Kurdistan
- County: Sanandaj
- Bakhsh: Central
- Rural District: Hoseynabad-e Jonubi

Population (2006)
  - Total: 148
- Time zone: UTC+3:30 (IRST)
  - Summer (DST): UTC+4:30 (IRDT)

Tazehabad-e Qaragol (Persian: تازه‌آباد قراگل, also Romanized as Tāzehābād-e Qarāgol; also known as Khairabad, Qarā Gol, Qarā Gūl, Qarāvol, Qarawal, Qara Wul, and Tāzehābād) is a village in Hoseynabad-e Jonubi Rural District, in the Central District of Sanandaj County, Kurdistan Province, Iran. At the 2006 census, its population was 148, in 34 families. The village is populated by Kurds.
