= Kheyrabad, Baharak District =

Kheyrabad Kheyrābād
- Location in Afghanistan
- Coordinates: 37°0′45″N 70°53′4″E
- Country: Afghanistan
- Province: Badakhshan Province
- District: Baharak District
- Time zone: + 4.30

Kheyrabad is a village in Baharak District, Badakhshan Province in north-eastern Afghanistan.
