= Kahang, Isfahan =

Village in Isfahan province, Iran

Kahang Persian: كهنگ
- Village
- Location within Iran
- Coordinates: 32°56′22″N 52°29′24″E
- Country: Iran
- Province: Isfahan
- County: Ardestan
- District: Central
- Rural District: Barzavand

Population (2016)
  - Total: 511
- Time zone: UTC+3:30 (IRST)

Kahang (Persian: كهنگ) (Note: Also romanized as Kohang; also known as Kohank) is a village in Barzavand Rural District of the Central District in Ardestan County, Isfahan province, Iran.

== Demographics ==
=== Population ===
At the time of the 2006 National Census, the village's population was 854 in 259 households. The following census in 2011 counted 587 people in 213 households. The 2016 census measured the population of the village as 511 people in 219 households.
