= Kheyrabad, Khusf =

Kheyrabad خيراباد
- Village
- Location within Iran
- Coordinates: 32°12′30″N 58°55′28″E
- Country: Iran
- Province: South Khorasan
- County: Khusf
- Bakhsh: Jolgeh-e Mazhan
- Rural District: Qaleh Zari

Population (2006)
  - Total: 48
- Time zone: UTC+3:30 (IRST)
  - Summer (DST): UTC+4:30 (IRDT)

Kheyrabad (Persian: خيراباد, also Romanized as Kheyrābād and Khairābād; also known as Kheir Abad Khoosaf) is a village in Qaleh Zari Rural District, Jolgeh-e Mazhan District, Khusf County, South Khorasan Province, Iran. At the 2006 census, its population was 48 people a part of 14 families.
