= Kheyrabad, Rudan =

Kheyrabad خيراباد
- Village
- Location within Iran
- Coordinates: 27°20′09″N 57°14′20″E
- Country: Iran
- Province: Hormozgan
- County: Rudan
- Bakhsh: Central
- Rural District: Abnama

Population (2006)
  - Total: 2,318
- Time zone: UTC+3:30 (IRST)
  - Summer (DST): UTC+4:30 (IRDT)

Kheyrabad (Persian: خيراباد, also Romanized as Kheyrābād) is a village in Abnama Rural District, in the Central District of Rudan County, Hormozgan Province, Iran. At the 2006 census, its population was 2,318, in 493 families.
