= Sadd-e Kheyrabad =

Sadd-e Kheyrabad سدخيراباد
- Village
- Location within Iran
- Coordinates: 31°48′43″N 48°26′24″E
- Country: Iran
- Province: Khuzestan
- County: Shush
- Bakhsh: Shavur
- Rural District: Seyyed Abbas

Population (2006)
  - Total: 44
- Time zone: UTC+3:30 (IRST)
  - Summer (DST): UTC+4:30 (IRDT)

Sadd-e Kheyrabad (Persian: سدخيراباد, also Romanized as Sadd-e Kheyrābād; also known as Kheyrābād-e Do) is a village in Seyyed Abbas Rural District, Shavur District, Shush County, Khuzestan Province, Iran. At the 2006 census, its population was 44, in 7 families.
