= Jizabad-e Shahan Garmab =

Jizabad-e Shahan Garmab جيزابادشاهان گرماب
- Village
- Location within Iran
- Coordinates: 35°50′09″N 60°08′28″E
- Country: Iran
- Province: Razavi Khorasan
- County: Mashhad
- Bakhsh: Razaviyeh
- Rural District: Abravan

Population (2006)
  - Total: 221
- Time zone: UTC+3:30 (IRST)
  - Summer (DST): UTC+4:30 (IRDT)

Jizabad-e Shahan Garmab (Persian: جيزابادشاهان گرماب, also Romanized as Jīzābād-e Shāhān Garmāb; also known as Jīzābād and Kheyrābād) is a village in Abravan Rural District, Razaviyeh District, Mashhad County, Razavi Khorasan Province, Iran. At the 2006 census, its population was 221, in 44 families.
