= Mehran, Tajikistan =

Mehron Meҳрон
- Village
- Location within Tajikistan
- Coordinates: 39.41691°N 69.28677°E
- Country: Tajikistan
- Region: Sughd Region
- District: Kuhistoni Mastchoh District
- Time zone: UTC+5

Mehron (Tajik: Meҳрон) is a village in northwestern Tajikistan. It is the seat of the Kuhistoni Mastchoh District, which is located in the Sughd Region.
