= Kolol, Dashtestan =

Village in Bushehr province, Iran

Kolol Persian: كلل
- Village
- Location within Iran
- Coordinates: 29°18′57″N 51°05′31″E
- Country: Iran
- Province: Bushehr
- County: Dashtestan
- District: Central
- Rural District: Ziarat

Population (2016)
  - Total: 614
- Time zone: UTC+3:30 (IRST)

Kolol (Persian: كلل) (Note: Also known as Kulal and Kūlol) is a village in Ziarat Rural District of the Central District in Dashtestan County, Bushehr province, Iran.

== Demographics ==
=== Population ===
At the time of the 2006 National Census, the village's population was 626 in 128 households. The following census in 2011 counted 644 people in 157 households. The 2016 census measured the population of the village as 614 people in 169 households.
