= Kheyrabad-e Sani =

Kheyrabad-e Sani خيرابادثاني
- Village
- Country: Iran
- Province: Khuzestan
- County: Shush
- Bakhsh: Central
- Rural District: Ben Moala

Population (2006)
  - Total: 256
- Time zone: UTC+3:30 (IRST)
  - Summer (DST): UTC+4:30 (IRDT)

Kheyrabad-e Sani (Persian: خيرابادثاني, also Romanized as Kheyrābād-e S̱ānī) is a village in Ben Moala Rural District, in the Central District of Shush County, Khuzestan Province, Iran. At the 2006 census, its population was 256, in 41 families.
