= Kheyrabad, Shirvan =

Village in North Khorasan province, Iran

Kheyrabad Persian: خيراباد
- Village
- Location within Iran
- Coordinates: 37°51′16″N 57°50′42″E
- Country: Iran
- Province: North Khorasan
- County: Shirvan
- District: Qushkhaneh
- Rural District: Qushkhaneh-ye Bala

Population (2016)
  - Total: 478
- Time zone: UTC+3:30 (IRST)

Kheyrabad (Persian: خيراباد) (Note: Also romanized as Kheyrābād; also known as Khairabād) is a village in Qushkhaneh-ye Bala Rural District (Note: Formerly Qushkhaneh Rural District) of Qushkhaneh District in Shirvan County, North Khorasan province, Iran.

== Demographics ==
=== Language ===
The local language is North khorasan Turkish.

=== Population ===
At the time of the 2006 National Census, the village's population was 564 in 132 households. The following census in 2011 counted 411 people in 108 households. The 2016 census measured the population of the village as 478 people in 136 households.
