= Kheyrabad-e Hajji Ahmad =

Kheyrabad-e Hajji Ahmad خيرابادحاجي احمد
- Village
- Country: Iran
- Province: Fars
- County: Neyriz
- Bakhsh: Qatruyeh
- Rural District: Rizab

Population (2006)
  - Total: 17
- Time zone: UTC+3:30 (IRST)
  - Summer (DST): UTC+4:30 (IRDT)

Kheyrabad-e Hajji Ahmad (Persian: خيرابادحاجي احمد, also Romanized as Kheyrābād-e Ḩājjī Aḩmad) is a village in Rizab Rural District, Qatruyeh District, Neyriz County, Fars province, Iran. At the 2006 census, its population was 17, in 4 families.
