= Kheyrabad, Mahmudabad-e Seyyed =

Kheyrabad خيراباد
- Village
- Location within Iran
- Coordinates: 29°32′17″N 55°35′20″E
- Country: Iran
- Province: Kerman
- County: Sirjan
- Bakhsh: Central
- Rural District: Mahmudabad-e Seyyed

Population (2006)
  - Total: 312
- Time zone: UTC+3:30 (IRST)
  - Summer (DST): UTC+4:30 (IRDT)

Kheyrabad (Persian: خيراباد, also Romanized as Kheyrābād) is a village in Mahmudabad-e Seyyed Rural District, in the Central District of Sirjan County, Kerman Province, Iran. At the 2006 census, its population was 312, in 70 families.
