= Kheyrabad, Qazvin =

Neighborhood in Qazvin province, Iran

Kheyrabad Persian: خيراباد
- Neighborhood
- Location within Iran
- Coordinates: 36°14′15″N 49°57′17″E
- Country: Iran
- Province: Qazvin
- County: Qazvin
- District: Central
- City: Qazvin

Population (2011)
  - Total: 1,520
- Time zone: UTC+3:30 (IRST)

Kheyrabad (Persian: خيراباد) (Note: Also romanized as Kheyrābād) is a neighborhood in the city of Qazvin in the Central District of Qazvin County, Qazvin province, Iran.

== Demographics ==
=== Population ===
At the time of the 2006 National Census, Kheyrabad's population was 1,126 in 287 households, when it was a village in Eqbal-e Gharbi Rural District. The following census in 2011 counted 1,520 people in 392 households. The village was annexed to the city of Qazvin in 2015.
