= Kheyrabad, Rey =

Kheyrabad خيراباد
- Village
- Location within Iran
- Coordinates: 35°33′15″N 51°24′30″E
- Country: Iran
- Province: Tehran
- County: Rey
- Bakhsh: Kahrizak
- Rural District: Kahrizak

Population (2006)
  - Total: 542
- Time zone: UTC+3:30 (IRST)
  - Summer (DST): UTC+4:30 (IRDT)

Kheyrabad (Persian: خيراباد, also Romanized as Kheyrābād; also known as Maḩalleh-ye Kheyrābād) is a village in Kahrizak Rural District, Kahrizak District, Ray County, Tehran Province, Iran. At the 2006 census, its population was 542, in 141 families.
