= Kheyrabad, Bardsir =

Kheyrabad خيراباد
- Village
- Location within Iran
- Coordinates: 29°53′00″N 56°58′51″E
- Country: Iran
- Province: Kerman
- County: Bardsir
- Bakhsh: Central
- Rural District: Negar

Population (2006)
  - Total: 77
- Time zone: UTC+3:30 (IRST)
  - Summer (DST): UTC+4:30 (IRDT)

Kheyrabad (Persian: خيراباد, also Romanized as Kheyrābād, Khairābād, and Kheir Abad) is a village in Negar Rural District, in the Central District of Bardsir County, Kerman Province, Iran. At the 2006 census, its population was 77, in 21 families.
