= Kheyrabad, Ardestan =

Village in Isfahan province, Iran

Kheyrabad Persian: خيراباد
- Village
- Location within Iran
- Coordinates: 32°55′09″N 52°36′17″E
- Country: Iran
- Province: Isfahan
- County: Ardestan
- District: Central
- Rural District: Barzavand

Population (2016)
  - Total: 214
- Time zone: UTC+3:30 (IRST)

Kheyrabad (Persian: خيراباد) (Note: Also romanized as Kheyrābād) is a village in Barzavand Rural District of the Central District in Ardestan County, Isfahan province, Iran.

== Demographics ==
=== Population ===
At the time of the 2006 National Census, the village's population was 343 in 86 households. The following census in 2011 counted 269 people in 82 households. The 2016 census measured the population of the village as 214 people in 68 households.
