= Kheyrabad, Nehbandan =

Kheyrabad خيراباد
- Village
- Location within Iran
- Coordinates: 31°51′02″N 59°58′15″E
- Country: Iran
- Province: South Khorasan
- County: Nehbandan
- Bakhsh: Shusef
- Rural District: Shusef

Population (2006)
  - Total: 15
- Time zone: UTC+3:30 (IRST)
  - Summer (DST): UTC+4:30 (IRDT)

Kheyrabad (Persian: خيراباد, also romanized as Kheyrābād and Khairābād) is a village in Shusef Rural District, Shusef District, Nehbandan County, South Khorasan Province, Iran. At the 2006 census, its population was 15, in 7 families.
