= Kheyrabad, Jangal =

Kheyrabad خيراباد
- Village
- Location within Iran
- Coordinates: 29°17′02″N 53°27′21″E
- Country: Iran
- Province: Fars
- County: Fasa
- Bakhsh: Central
- Rural District: Jangal

Population (2006)
  - Total: 344
- Time zone: UTC+3:30 (IRST)
  - Summer (DST): UTC+4:30 (IRDT)

Kheyrabad (Persian: خيراباد, also Romanized as Kheyrābād; also known as Kheyrābād-e Jangal) is a village in Jangal Rural District, in the Central District of Fasa County, Fars province, Iran. At the 2006 census, its population was 344, in 104 families.
