= Aghzavar =

Aghzavar اغزوار
- Village
- Location within Iran
- Coordinates: 32°32′22″N 59°41′14″E
- Country: Iran
- Province: South Khorasan
- County: Sarbisheh
- Bakhsh: Central
- Rural District: Momenabad

Population (2006)
  - Total: 63
- Time zone: UTC+3:30 (IRST)
  - Summer (DST): UTC+4:30 (IRDT)

Aghzavar (Persian: اغزوار, also Romanized as Aghzavār and Aghzevār; also known as Kalāteh-ye Aghzavār, Kalāteh Aghzvār, and Kheyrābād) is a village in Momenabad Rural District, in the Central District of Sarbisheh County, South Khorasan Province, Iran. At the 2006 census, its population was 63, in 15 families.
