= Kheyrabad, Marvdasht =

Kheyrabad خيراباد
- Village
- Location within Iran
- Coordinates: 29°50′51″N 52°57′53″E
- Country: Iran
- Province: Fars
- County: Marvdasht
- Bakhsh: Central
- Rural District: Mohammadabad

Population (2006)
  - Total: 792
- Time zone: UTC+3:30 (IRST)
  - Summer (DST): UTC+4:30 (IRDT)

Kheyrabad (Persian: خيراباد, also Romanized as Kheyrābād; also known as Khair Abad Marvdasht and Kheyrābād-e Marvdasht) is a village in Mohammadabad Rural District, in the Central District of Marvdasht County, Fars province, Iran. At the 2006 census, its population was 792, in 196 families.
