= Patali, Jiroft =

Patali پاتلي
- Village
- Interactive map of Patali
- Country: Iran
- Province: Kerman
- County: Jiroft
- Bakhsh: Central
- Rural District: Khatunabad

Population (2006)
  - Total: 23
- Time zone: UTC+3:30 (IRST)
  - Summer (DST): UTC+4:30 (IRDT)

Patali (Persian: پاتلي, also Romanized as Pātalī) is a village in Khatunabad Rural District, in the Central District of Jiroft County, Kerman Province, Iran. At the 2006 census, its population was 23, in 7 families.

According to the 2011 census conducted by the Statistical Center of Iran, Patli Village has a population of 28 people, consisting of 11 men and 17 women. The village contains 8 households and 6 residential units.

== Tourism, demographics, and services ==
Patli Village is located in the Khatunabad Rural District and is characterized by a forest-like environment on a plain. The village is accessible by a paved road.

=== Facilities and services ===
Patli Village has limited services and facilities. Below is a list of the available and unavailable amenities:

- Sports field: Not available
- Sports hall: Not available
- Mosque: Not available
- Imamzadeh shrine: Not available
- National power grid: Available
- Diesel power generator: Not available
- Renewable energy sources (Solar, Wind, etc.): Not available
- Piped gas: No data available
- Piped water supply: Available

=== Additional services ===
- Public bath: Not available
- Public Internet access: Not available
- Public transportation access: Available
- Grocery store: Not available
- Bakery: Not available
