= Kheyrabad, Marivan =

Kheyrabad خير آباد
- Village
- Location within Iran
- Coordinates: 35°27′33″N 46°17′06″E
- Country: Iran
- Province: Kurdistan
- County: Marivan
- Bakhsh: Central
- Rural District: Sarkal

Population (2006)
  - Total: 185
- Time zone: UTC+3:30 (IRST)
  - Summer (DST): UTC+4:30 (IRDT)

Kheyrabad (Persian: خير آباد, also Romanized as Kheyrābād and Khairabad) is a village in Sarkal Rural District, in the Central District of Marivan County, Kurdistan Province, Iran. At the 2006 census, its population was 185, in 42 families. The village is populated by Kurds.
