= Kheyrabad-e Sofla, Razavi Khorasan =

Village in Razavi Khorasan province, Iran

Kheyrabad-e Sofla Persian: خيرابادسفلي
- Village
- Location within Iran
- Coordinates: 37°30′35″N 59°15′05″E
- Country: Iran
- Province: Razavi Khorasan
- County: Dargaz
- District: Lotfabad
- Rural District: Dibaj

Population (2016)
  - Total: 87
- Time zone: UTC+3:30 (IRST)

Kheyrabad-e Sofla (Persian: خيرابادسفلي) (Note: Also romanized as Kheyrābād-e Soflá; also known as Kalāteh-ye Hāshemābād (كلاته هاشم اباد)) is a village in Dibaj Rural District of Lotfabad District in Dargaz County, Razavi Khorasan province, Iran.

== Demographics ==
=== Population ===
At the time of the 2006 National Census, the village's population was 101 in 29 households. The following census in 2011 counted 114 people in 42 households. The 2016 census measured the population of the village as 87 people in 33 households.
