= Kheyrabad, Darab =

Kheyrabad خيراباد
- Village
- Location within Iran
- Coordinates: 28°41′32″N 54°35′30″E
- Country: Iran
- Province: Fars
- County: Darab
- Bakhsh: Central
- Rural District: Qaryah ol Kheyr

Population (2006)
  - Total: 617
- Time zone: UTC+3:30 (IRST)
  - Summer (DST): UTC+4:30 (IRDT)

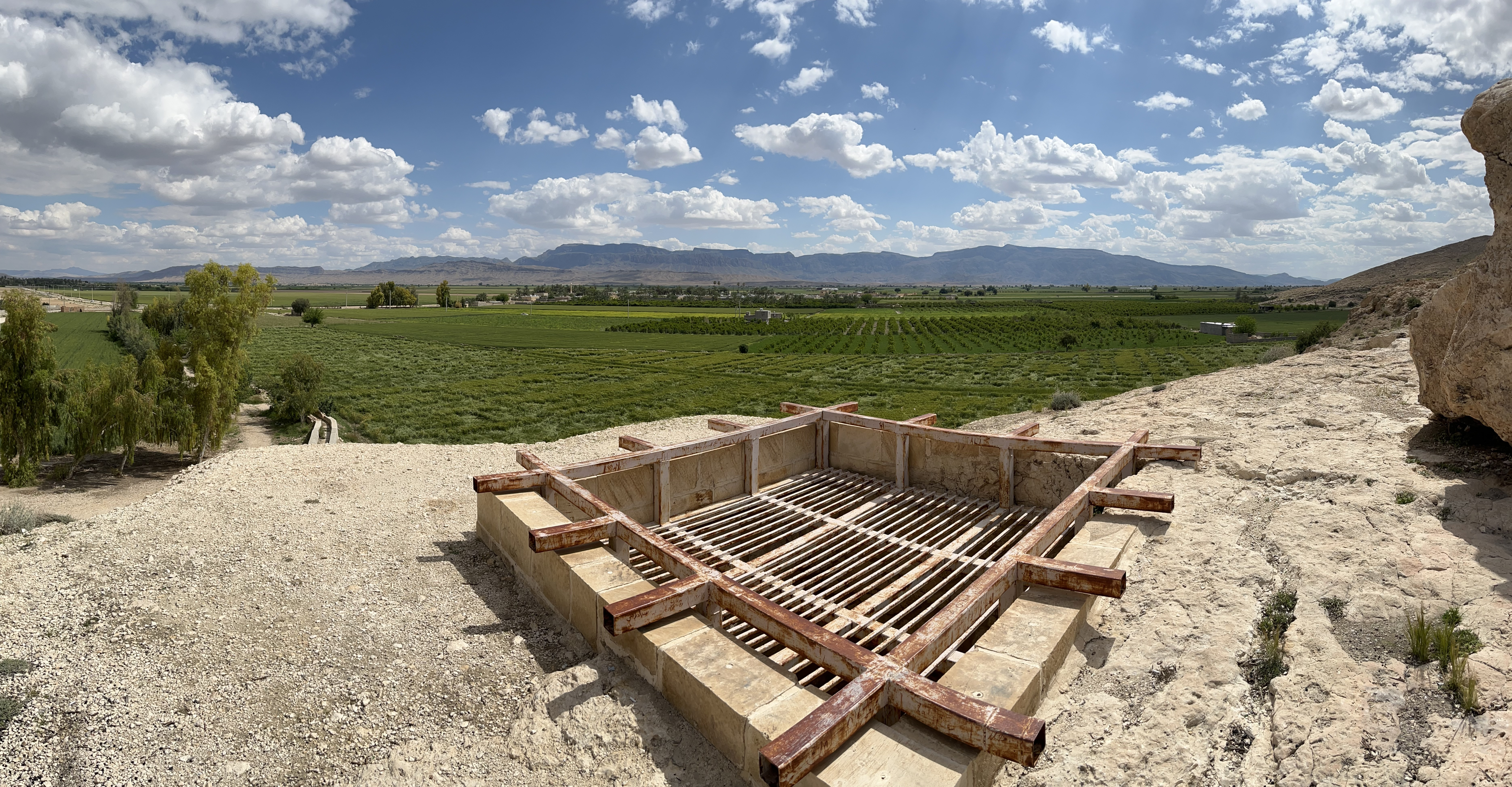
Darab Stone Mosque

Kheyrabad (Persian: خيراباد, also Romanized as Kheyrābād, Khairābād, and Kheir Abad) is a village in Qaryah ol Kheyr Rural District, in the Central District of Darab County, Fars province, Iran. At the 2006 census, its population was 617, in 125 families.
