= Kheyrabad-e Koruni =

Kheyrabad-e Koruni, Iran خيرابادكروني
- Village
- Location within Iran
- Coordinates: 29°42′49″N 51°35′13″E
- Country: Iran
- Province: Fars
- County: Kazerun
- Bakhsh: Central
- Rural District: Deris

Population (2006)
  - Total: 1,125
- Time zone: UTC+3:30 (IRST)
  - Summer (DST): UTC+4:30 (IRDT)

Kheyrabad-e Koruni (Persian: خيرابادكروني, also Romanized as Kheyrābād-e Korūnī; also known as Korūnī-ye Kheyrābād) is a village in Deris Rural District, in the Central District of Kazerun County, Fars province, Iran. At the 2006 census, its population was 1,125, in 235 families.
