= Kheyrabad-e Olya, Kerman =

Kheyrabad-e Olya خيرابادعليا
- Village
- Location within Iran
- Coordinates: 30°39′22″N 54°51′36″E
- Country: Iran
- Province: Kerman
- County: Shahr-e Babak
- Bakhsh: Dehaj
- Rural District: Dehaj

Population (2006)
  - Total: 146
- Time zone: UTC+3:30 (IRST)
  - Summer (DST): UTC+4:30 (IRDT)

Kheyrabad-e Olya (Persian: خيرابادعليا, also Romanized as Kheyrābād-e ‘Olyā) is a village in Dehaj Rural District, Dehaj District, Shahr-e Babak County, Kerman Province, Iran. At the 2006 census, its population was 146, in 20 families.
