= Kheyrabad, Kamyaran =

Kheyrabad خير آباد
- Village
- Location within Iran
- Coordinates: 35°03′00″N 47°15′00″E
- Country: Iran
- Province: Kurdistan
- County: Kamyaran
- Bakhsh: Muchesh
- Rural District: Amirabad

Population (2006)
  - Total: 363
- Time zone: UTC+3:30 (IRST)
  - Summer (DST): UTC+4:30 (IRDT)

Kheyrabad (Persian: خير آباد, also Romanized as Kheyrābād and Khairābād) is a village in Amirabad Rural District, Muchesh District, Kamyaran County, Kurdistan Province, Iran. At the 2006 census, its population was 363, in 82 families. The village is populated by Kurds.
