= Kheyrabad-e Olya, Razavi Khorasan =

Kheyrabad-e Olya خيرابادعليا
- Village
- Location within Iran
- Coordinates: 37°26′35″N 59°04′53″E
- Country: Iran
- Province: Razavi Khorasan
- County: Dargaz
- Bakhsh: Central
- Rural District: Takab

Population (2006)
  - Total: 54
- Time zone: UTC+3:30 (IRST)
  - Summer (DST): UTC+4:30 (IRDT)

Kheyrabad-e Olya (Persian: خيرابادعليا, also Romanized as Kheyrābād-e ‘Olyā; also known as Kheyrābād and Kheytābād-e ‘Olyā) is a village in Takab Rural District, in the Central District of Dargaz County, Razavi Khorasan Province, Iran. At the 2006 census, its population was 54, in 13 families.
