= Kheyrabad-e Kaffah =

Kheyrabad-e Kaffah خيرابادكفه
- Village
- Location within Iran
- Coordinates: 29°25′52″N 55°18′00″E
- Country: Iran
- Province: Kerman
- County: Sirjan
- Bakhsh: Central
- Rural District: Sharifabad

Population (2006)
  - Total: 107
- Time zone: UTC+3:30 (IRST)
  - Summer (DST): UTC+4:30 (IRDT)

Kheyrabad-e Kaffah (Persian: خيرابادكفه, also Romanized as Kheyrābād-e Kaffah; also known as Khairābād and Kheyrābād) is a village in Sharifabad Rural District, in the Central District of Sirjan County, Kerman Province, Iran. At the 2006 census, its population was 107, in 33 families.
