= Kheyrabad-e Seyf Laleh =

Kheyrabad-e Seyf Laleh خيرابادسيف لله
- Village
- Location within Iran
- Coordinates: 30°32′14″N 50°30′57″E
- Country: Iran
- Province: Kohgiluyeh and Boyer-Ahmad
- County: Gachsaran
- Bakhsh: Central
- Rural District: Lishtar

Population (2006)
  - Total: 42
- Time zone: UTC+3:30 (IRST)
  - Summer (DST): UTC+4:30 (IRDT)

Kheyrabad-e Seyf Laleh (Persian: خيرابادسيف لله, also Romanized as Kheyrābād-e Seyf Laleh; also known as Kheyrābād, Kheyrābād-e Bālā, and Kheyrābād-e ‘Olyā) is a village in Lishtar Rural District, in the Central District of Gachsaran County, Kohgiluyeh and Boyer-Ahmad Province, Iran. At the 2006 census, its population was 42, in 9 families.
