= Kheyrabad-e Gohar =

Kheyrabad-e Gohar خیرآباد گهر
- Village
- Location within Iran
- Coordinates: 30°31′51″N 50°24′28″E
- Country: Iran
- Province: Khuzestan
- County: Behbahan
- Bakhsh: Central
- Rural District: Howmeh

Population (2006)
  - Total: 638
- Time zone: UTC+3:30 (IRST)
  - Summer (DST): UTC+4:30 (IRDT)

Kheyrabad-e Gohar (Persian: خیرآباد گهر, also Romanized as Kheyrābād-e Gohar and Kheyrābād-e Gahar; also known as Khairābād and Kheyrābād) is a village in Howmeh Rural District, in the Central District of Behbahan County, Khuzestan Province, Iran. At the 2006 census, its population was 638, in 122 families.
