= Kheyrabad-e Bala =

Village in Lorestan province, Iran

Kheyrabad-e Bala Persian: خير آباد بالا
- Village
- Location within Iran
- Country: Iran
- Province: Lorestan
- County: Chegeni
- District: Central
- Rural District: Teshkan

Population (2016)
  - Total: 41
- Time zone: UTC+3:30 (IRST)

Kheyrabad-e Bala (Persian: خير آباد بالا) (Note: Also romanized as Kheyrābād-e Bālā; formerly known as Kheyrabad-e Olya (خيرابادعليا), also romanized as Kheyrābād-e ‘Olyā; also known as Bar Āftāb and Kheyrābād-e Vālī) is a village in Teshkan Rural District of the Central District (Note: Formerly Chegeni District) in Chegeni County, (Note: Formerly Dowreh County) Lorestan province, Iran.

== Demographics ==
=== Population ===
At the time of the 2006 National Census, the village's population, as Kheyrabad-e Olya, was 37 in four households, when it was in the former Dowreh-ye Chegeni District of Khorramabad County. The following census in 2011 counted 34 people in seven households, by which time the district had been separated from the county in the establishment of Dowreh County. (Note: Renamed Chegeni County) The rural district was transferred to the new Chegeni District, (Note: Renamed the Central District) and the village was listed as Kheyrabad-e Bala. The 2016 census measured the population of the village as 41 people in 14 households.
