= Khederabad, Kermanshah =

Khederabad خدراباد
- Village
- Location within Iran
- Coordinates: 34°34′49″N 47°26′12″E
- Country: Iran
- Province: Kermanshah
- County: Sahneh
- Bakhsh: Dinavar
- Rural District: Dinavar

Population (2006)
  - Total: 132
- Time zone: UTC+3:30 (IRST)
  - Summer (DST): UTC+4:30 (IRDT)

Khederabad (Persian: خدراباد, also Romanized as Khederābād and Khedrābād; also known as Khairābād, Kheyrābād, and Khezrābād) is a village in Dinavar Rural District, Dinavar District, Sahneh County, Kermanshah Province, Iran. At the 2006 census, its population was 132, in 31 families.
