= Kheyrabad-e Pain, Lorestan =

Village in Lorestan province, Iran

Kheyrabad-e Pain Persian: خير آباد پايين
- Village
- Location within Iran
- Country: Iran
- Province: Lorestan
- County: Chegeni
- District: Central
- Rural District: Teshkan

Population (2016)
  - Total: 114
- Time zone: UTC+3:30 (IRST)

Kheyrabad-e Pain (Persian: خير آباد پايين) (Note: Also romanized as Kheyrābād-e Pā’īn; formerly known as Kheyrabad-e Sofla (خيرآباد سفلي), also romanized as Kheyrābād-e Soflá; also known as Nāzbānū (نازبانو)) is a village in Teshkan Rural District of the Central District (Note: Formerly Chegeni District) in Chegeni County, (Note: Formerly Dowreh County) Lorestan province, Iran.

== Demographics ==
=== Population ===
At the time of the 2006 National Census, the village's population, as Kheyrabad-e Sofla, was 129 in 27 households, when it was in the former Dowreh-ye Chegeni District of Khorramabad County. The following census in 2011 counted 127 people in 31 households, by which time the district had been separated from the county in the establishment of Dowreh County. (Note: Renamed Chegeni County) The rural district was transferred to the new Chegeni District, (Note: Renamed the Central District) and the village was listed as Kheyrabad-e Pain. The 2016 census measured the population of the village as 114 people in 31 households.
