= Qushkhaneh-ye Bala Rural District =

Rural district in North Khorasan province, Iran

Qushkhaneh-ye Bala Rural District Persian: دهستان قوشخانه بالا
- Rural District
- Location within Iran
- Coordinates: 37°47′N 57°50′E
- Country: Iran
- Province: North Khorasan
- County: Shirvan
- District: Qushkhaneh
- Established: 1987
- Capital: Qushkhaneh

Population (2016)
  - Total: 5,270
- Time zone: UTC+3:30 (IRST)

Qushkhaneh-ye Bala Rural District (Persian: دهستان قوشخانه بالا) (Note: Formerly Qushkhaneh Rural District (دهستان قوشخانه)) is in Qushkhaneh District of Shirvan County, North Khorasan province, Iran. It is administered from the city of Qushkhaneh. (Note: Formerly the village of Yengi Qaleh-ye Bala)

== Demographics ==
=== Population ===
At the time of the 2006 National Census, the rural district's population was 8,048 in 1,820 households. There were 6,229 inhabitants in 1,680 households at the following census of 2011. The 2016 census measured the population of the rural district as 5,270 in 1,573 households. The most populous of its 18 villages was Sardab, with 785 people.

=== Other villages in the rural district ===
- Bagh
- Hesar
- Kakoli
- Kheyrabad
- Qolhak-e Olya
- Sarani
- Sevaldi
- Zeydar
