= Patali, Anbarabad =

Patali پاتلي
- Village
- Location within Iran
- Coordinates: 28°21′31″N 57°51′02″E
- Country: Iran
- Province: Kerman
- County: Anbarabad
- Bakhsh: Central
- Rural District: Jahadabad

Population (2006)
  - Total: 492
- Time zone: UTC+3:30 (IRST)
  - Summer (DST): UTC+4:30 (IRDT)

Patali (Persian: پاتلي, also Romanized as Pātalī; also known as Kheyrābād-e Pātelī) is a village in Jahadabad Rural District, in the Central District of Anbarabad County, Kerman Province, Iran. At the 2006 census, its population was 492, in 105 families.
