= Kheyrabad, Kushk-e Qazi =

Kheyrabad خيراباد
- Village
- Location within Iran
- Coordinates: 28°54′56″N 53°40′28″E
- Country: Iran
- Province: Fars
- County: Fasa
- Bakhsh: Central
- Rural District: Kushk-e Qazi

Population (2006)
  - Total: 1,530
- Time zone: UTC+3:30 (IRST)
  - Summer (DST): UTC+4:30 (IRDT)

Kheyrabad (Persian: خيراباد, also Romanized as Kheyrābād; also known as Kheyrābād-e Ḩūmeh) is a village in Kushk-e Qazi Rural District, in the Central District of Fasa County, Fars province, Iran. At the 2006 census, its population was 1,530, in 368 families.
