= Kheyrabad-e Sofla, Kohgiluyeh and Boyer-Ahmad =

Kheyrabad-e Sofla خيرابادسفلي
- Village
- Location within Iran
- Coordinates: 30°31′33″N 50°26′23″E
- Country: Iran
- Province: Kohgiluyeh and Boyer-Ahmad
- County: Gachsaran
- Bakhsh: Central
- Rural District: Lishtar

Population (2006)
  - Total: 808
- Time zone: UTC+3:30 (IRST)
  - Summer (DST): UTC+4:30 (IRDT)

Kheyrabad-e Sofla (Persian: خيرابادسفلي, also Romanized as Kheyrābād-e Soflá; also known as Khairābād, Kheyrābād, and Kheyrābād-e Pā’īn) is a village in Lishtar Rural District, in the Central District of Gachsaran County, Kohgiluyeh and Boyer-Ahmad Province, Iran. At the 2006 census, its population was 808, in 166 families.
