= Kheyrabad, Anbarabad =

Kheyrabad خيراباد
- Village
- Location within Iran
- Coordinates: 28°21′21″N 57°50′03″E
- Country: Iran
- Province: Kerman
- County: Anbarabad
- Bakhsh: Central
- Rural District: Jahadabad

Population (2006)
  - Total: 573
- Time zone: UTC+3:30 (IRST)
  - Summer (DST): UTC+4:30 (IRDT)

Kheyrabad (Persian: خيراباد, also Romanized as Kheyrābād; also known as Kheir Abād Hoomeh and Kheyrābād-e Ḩūmeh) is a village in Jahadabad Rural District, in the Central District of Anbarabad County, Kerman Province, Iran. At the 2006 census, its population was 573, in 120 families.
