= Ivan-Tojik =

Ivan-Tojik Russian: Иван-Точик Tajik: Иван-Тоҷик
- Jamoat
- Ivan-Tojik jamoat depicted on a map of Tajikistan

- Location in Tajikistan
- Coordinates: 39°27′N 69°33′E
- Country: Tajikistan
- Region: Sughd Region
- District: Kuhistoni Mastchoh District

Population (2015)
  - Total: 13,578
- Time zone: UTC+5 (TJT)

Ivan-Tojik (Russian: Иван-Точик; Tajik: Иван-Тоҷик) is a jamoat in north-west Tajikistan. It is located in Kuhistoni Mastchoh District in Sughd Region. The jamoat has a total population of 13,578 (2015). It consists of 18 villages, including Padrokh (the seat), Esizi Poyon, Hadishahr, Mehron and Ustung.
