= Qushkhaneh District =

District in North Khorasan province, Iran

Qushkhaneh District Persian: بخش قوشخانه
- District
- Location within Iran
- Coordinates: 37°47′N 57°45′E
- Country: Iran
- Province: North Khorasan
- County: Shirvan
- Established: 2006
- Capital: Qushkhaneh

Population (2016)
  - Total: 10,423
- Time zone: UTC+3:30 (IRST)

Qushkhaneh District (Persian: بخش قوشخانه) is in Shirvan County, North Khorasan province, Iran. Its capital is the city of Qushkhaneh.

== History ==
The village of Yengi Qaleh-ye Bala was converted to a city as Qushkhaneh in 2012.

== Demographics ==
=== Population ===
At the time of the 2006 census, the district's population was 13,819 in 3,014 households. The following census in 2011 counted 11,125 people in 2,970 households. The 2016 census measured the population of the district as 10,423 inhabitants in 3,065 households.

=== Administrative divisions ===
Qushkhaneh District Population
Administrative Divisions	2006	2011	2016
Qushkhaneh-ye Bala RD (Note: Formerly Qushkhaneh Rural District)	8,048	6,229	5,270
Qushkhaneh-ye Pain RD	5,771	4,896	4,157
Qushkhaneh (city) (Note: Formerly the village of Yengi Qaleh-ye Bala)			996
Total	13,819	11,125	10,423
RD = Rural District
