= Central District (Dashtestan County) =

District in Bushehr province, Iran

Central District (Dashtestan County) Persian: بخش مرکزی شهرستان دشتستان
- District
- Location within Iran
- Coordinates: 29°18′N 51°15′E
- Country: Iran
- Province: Bushehr
- County: Dashtestan
- Capital: Borazjan

Population (2016)
  - Total: 145,460
- Time zone: UTC+3:30 (IRST)

The Central District of Dashtestan County (Persian: بخش مرکزی شهرستان دشتستان) is in Bushehr province, Iran. Its capital is the city of Borazjan.

== Demographics ==
=== Population ===
At the time of the 2006 National Census, the district's population was 124,291 in 27,199 households. The following census in 2011 counted 128,334 people in 32,236 households. The 2016 census measured the population of the district as 145,460 inhabitants living in 40,845 households.

=== Administrative divisions ===
Central District (Dashtestan County) Population
Administrative Divisions	2006	2011	2016
Dalaki RD	10,490	11,761	12,208
Howmeh RD (Note: Formerly Khvosh Makan Rural District)	6,838	8,148	9,603
Ziarat RD	6,881	6,932	6,646
Borazjan (city)	92,221	95,449	110,567
Dalaki (city)	7,861	6,044	6,436
Total	124,291	128,334	145,460
RD = Rural District
