= Kuhistoni Mastchoh District =

Kuhistoni Mastchoh District Russian: Горно-Матчинский район Tajik: Ноҳияи Кӯҳистони Мастчоҳ
- District
- Location of Kuhistoni Mastchoh District in Tajikistan
- Coordinates: 39°25′N 69°35′E
- Country: Tajikistan
- Region: Sughd Region
- Capital: Mehron

Area
  - Total: 3,700 km^{2} (1,400 sq mi)

Population (2020)
  - Total: 25,400
  - Density: 6.9/km^{2} (18/sq mi)
- Time zone: UTC+5 (TJT)

Kuhistoni Mastchoh District or Nohiya-i Kuhistoni Mastchoh (Tajik: Ноҳияи Кӯҳистони Мастчоҳ), also known as the Gorno-Matchinsky Region (Russian: Горно-Матчинский район) is a district in Sughd Region, Tajikistan. The capital of district is the village of Mehron. The population of the district is 25,400 (January 2020 estimate).

== Administrative divisions ==
The district has an area of about 3,700 km^{2} (1,000 sq mi) and is divided administratively into two jamoats. They are as follows:

Jamoat	Population (Jan. 2015)
Ivan-Tojik	13,578
Langar	9,666
