= Faryab (disambiguation) =

Faryab is a city in Afghanistan, the capital of Faryab Province.

Faryab or Fariab or Fareyab or Fariyab (Persian: فارياب) may also refer to the following places in Iran:

- Faryab, Iran, city in Kerman Province
- Faryab, Dashtestan, Bushehr Province
- Faryab, alternate name of Rud-e-Faryab, Bushehr Province
- Tang-e Fariab, Bushehr Province
- Faryab, Mohr, Fars Province
- Fariab, Rostam, Fars Province
- Faryab, Bastak, Hormozgan Province
- Faryab, Minab, Hormozgan Province
- Faryab, Rudan, Hormozgan Province
- Faryab, Rudkhaneh, Hormozgan Province
- Faryab-e Isin, Hormozgan Province
- Faryab-e Sanguyeh, Hormozgan Province
- Faryab, Khuzestan
- Fariab-e Kalamak, Kohgiluyeh and Boyer-Ahmad Province
- Faryab County, in Kerman Province
- Faryab Rural District, in Hormozgan Province
