= Tashan =

Tashan may refer to:

== Geography ==
=== Bahrain ===
- Tashan, Bahrain, village

=== China ===
- Mount Ta (Yantai) (塔山; pinyin: Tǎshān), a tourist site in Zhifu District, Yantai, Shandong
- Tashan Township (塌山乡), a town in Kuancheng Manchu Autonomous County, Hebei
- Tashan, Ganyu District (塔山镇), a town in Ganyu District, Jiangsu
- Tashan, Jiangsu (塔山镇), in a town in Jiawang District, Xuzhou, Jiangsu

=== Iran ===
- Tashan, Khuzestan, a village in Khuzestan Province
- Tashan, Bushehr, a village in Bushehr Province
- Tashan District, Behbahan County, Khuzestan Province
- Tashan Rural District, Jam County, Bushehr Province

=== Turkey ===
- Taşhan, Mut, in Mersin Province

=== Ukraine ===
- Tashan rural hromada, and Tashan (village), its administrative center

== Other uses ==
- Tashan (film), a 2008 Indian film
- Battle of Tashan (塔山爭奪戰), a 1948 battle fought in Liaoning
- Seyfi Tashan (born 1925), Turkish publisher

== See also ==
- Teshan (disambiguation)
- Tashaun Gipson, an American football player
- Tayshaun Prince, an American basketball executive
