= Deh Rud =

Deh Rud or Dehrud or Dehrood (Persian: دهرود) may refer to:

- Dehrud-e Olya, Bushehr Province
- Dehrud-e Sofla, Bushehr Province
- Dehrud, East Azerbaijan
- Deh Rud, Fars
- Deh Rud, Kerman
- Deh Rud, Razavi Khorasan
- Dehrud Rural District, in Bushehr Province
