= Bidu =

BIDU or Bidu may refer to:

== Places ==
- Bidu, Dashtestan, Bushehr, Iran
- Bidu, Deylam, Bushehr, Iran
- Bidu, Jam, Bushehr, Iran
- Bidu, Anarestan, Jam, Bushehr, Iran
- Bidu, Shahr-e Babak, Kerman, Iran
- Bidu, Yazd, Iran
- Bidu (woreda), Ethiopia

== Other uses ==
- Bidu (god), gatekeeper of the underworld in Mesopotamian mythology
- Bidu Cola, Argentinian cola soft drink, also marketed in other countries, including Curaçao (Netherlands Antilles)
- Bidu Sayão (1902–1999), Brazilian opera soprano
- BIDU, the NASDAQ ticker symbol for Baidu
- Blu (Monica's Gang) (known as Bidu in Brazil), a character in Monica's Gang media
- Bidu (footballer) (Matheus Lima Beltrão Oliveira), Brazilian footballer

== See also ==
- Biddu Appaiah (born 1944), Anglo-Indian musician
- Biddu, Jerusalem
