= Suck =

Suck may refer to:

- Suction, the force exerted by a partial vacuum
- .sucks, an Internet top-level domain

== Arts and entertainment ==
=== Music ===
- Suck (band), a South African hard rock group
- Suck, drummer for the 1990s Japanese punk band Teengenerate
- Suck, a 2003 album by The Revs
- "Suck", a song by Pigface from Gub
- "Suck", a song by Priests from Nothing Feels Natural
- "Suck", a song by Shriekback from Jam Science
- "Sucks" (song), a song by KMFDM

=== Other media ===
- Suck (film), a 2009 vampire musical-comedy
- Suck (publication), a European underground pornographic magazine, 1969–1974
- Suck.com, a satire and editorial web site
- "S U C K", a 2014 episode of Ray Donovan

== Rivers ==
- River Suck, a river in Ireland
- Suck Run, a stream in Ohio

== See also ==
- Suck Creek (disambiguation)
- Sucker (disambiguation)
- Suk (disambiguation)
- Sux (disambiguation)
- Mediocrity (disambiguation)
