= Suk =

Suk or SUK may refer to:

== Places ==
- Suk, Iran, a village in Bushehr Province
- Suk Qazqan, a village in Markazi Province, Iran
- Seh Suk, a village in Lorestan Province, Iran
- Suk Samran District, a district of Ranong Province, Thailand
- Santi Suk, Chiang Mai, a subdistrict of Doi Lo District, Thailand
- Santi Suk, Chiang Rai, a subdistrict of Phan District, Thailand

== Acronyms ==
- The ISO 639 language code for the Sukuma language
- The IATA airport code for the Sakkyryr Airport
- The ICAO airline code for the Superior Aviation Services of Kenya

== Other ==
- Suk (name), a surname and given name
- Josef Suk (composer) (1874–1935), Czech composer and violinist
  - Suk Chamber Orchestra, named after composer
- Josef Suk (violinist) (1929–2011), the composer's grandson, Czech violinist and conductor
  - Suk Trio, a Czech piano trio founded in 1951
- Suk School, a fictional medical school in Frank Herbert's Dune universe
- Suk tribe, Kenya

== See also ==
- Suck (disambiguation)
- souk, an open-air Arab marketplace
