= Paraf, Iran =

Paraf (Persian: پاراف), in Iran, may refer to:

- Paraf-e Bala
- Paraf-e Pain
