= Mir Ahmad =

Mir Ahmad may refer to:

- Aqa Mir Ahmad
- Mir Ahmad I
- Mir Ahmad II
- Mir Ahmad, Khuzestan
- Mir Ahmad, Lorestan
