= Lardeh =

Lardeh (Persian: لرده) may refer to:

- Lardeh, Bushehr
- Lardeh, Rudsar, Gilan Province
- Lardeh, Siahkal, Gilan Province
