= Charab =

Village in Bushehr province, Iran

Charab Persian: چراب
- Village
- Location within Iran
- Country: Iran
- Province: Bushehr
- County: Dashtestan
- District: Eram
- Rural District: Eram

Population (2016)
  - Total: Below reporting threshold
- Time zone: UTC+3:30 (IRST)

Charab (Persian: چراب) (Note: Also romanized as Charāb) is a village in Eram Rural District of Eram District in Dashtestan County, Bushehr province, Iran.

== Demographics ==
=== Population ===
At the time of the 2006 National Census, the village's population was 87 in 16 households. The following census in 2011 counted a population below the reporting threshold. The 2016 census again measured the population of the village as below the reporting threshold.
