= Bagh-e Taj =

Village in Bushehr province, Iran

Bagh-e Taj Persian: باغ تاج
- Village
- Location within Iran
- Country: Iran
- Province: Bushehr
- County: Dashtestan
- District: Eram
- Rural District: Eram

Population (2016)
  - Total: 105
- Time zone: UTC+3:30 (IRST)

Bagh-e Taj (Persian: باغ تاج) (Note: Also romanized as Bāgh-e Tāj) is a village in Eram Rural District of Eram District in Dashtestan County, Bushehr province, Iran.

== Demographics ==
=== Population ===
At the time of the 2006 National Census, the village's population was 271 in 49 households. The following census in 2011 counted 100 people in 25 households. The 2016 census measured the population of the village as 105 people in 29 households.
