= Runi =

Village in Bushehr province, Iran

Runi Persian: روني
- Village
- Location within Iran
- Coordinates: 29°07′35″N 51°45′06″E
- Country: Iran
- Province: Bushehr
- County: Dashtestan
- District: Eram
- Rural District: Dehrud

Population (2016)
  - Total: 450
- Time zone: UTC+3:30 (IRST)

Runi (Persian: روني) (Note: also romanized as Rūnī) is a village in Dehrud Rural District of Eram District in Dashtestan County, Bushehr province, Iran.

== Demographics ==
=== Population ===
At the time of the 2006 National Census, the village's population was 744 in 130 households. The following census in 2011 counted 435 people in 97 households. The 2016 census measured the population of the village as 450 people in 104 households.
