= Sanavin Sana =

Village in Bushehr province, Iran

Sanavin Sana Persian: سناوين سنا
- Village
- Location within Iran
- Coordinates: 29°12′43″N 51°33′37″E
- Country: Iran
- Province: Bushehr
- County: Dashtestan
- District: Eram
- Rural District: Eram

Population (2016)
  - Total: 190
- Time zone: UTC+3:30 (IRST)

Sanavin Sana (Persian: سناوين سنا) (Note: Also romanized as Sanāvīn Sanā; also known as S̄anā and Senā) is a village in Eram Rural District of Eram District in Dashtestan County, Bushehr province, Iran.

== Demographics ==
=== Population ===
At the time of the 2006 National Census, the village's population was 507 in 80 households. The following census in 2011 counted 166 people in 35 households. The 2016 census measured the population of the village as 190 people in 52 households.
