= Nakhah =

Village in Bushehr province, Iran

Nakhah Persian: ناخا
- Village
- Location within Iran
- Country: Iran
- Province: Bushehr
- County: Dashtestan
- District: Eram
- Rural District: Eram

Population (2016)
  - Total: 19
- Time zone: UTC+3:30 (IRST)

Nakhah (Persian: ناخا) (Note: Also romanized as Nākhāh) is a village in Eram Rural District of Eram District in Dashtestan County, Bushehr province, Iran.

== Demographics ==
=== Population ===
At the time of the 2006 National Census, the village's population was 32 in five households. The following census in 2011 counted five people in five households. The 2016 census measured the population of the village as 19 people in five households.
