= Kaftaru =

Village in Bushehr province, Iran

Kaftaru Persian: كفترو
- Village
- Location within Iran
- Coordinates: 29°07′27″N 51°40′26″E
- Country: Iran
- Province: Bushehr
- County: Dashtestan
- District: Eram
- Rural District: Dehrud

Population (2016)
  - Total: 157
- Time zone: UTC+3:30 (IRST)

Kaftaru (Persian: كفترو) (Note: Also romanized as Kaftārū; also known as Kaftar, also romanized as Kaftār) is a village in Dehrud Rural District of Eram District in Dashtestan County, Bushehr province, Iran.

== Demographics ==
=== Population ===
At the time of the 2006 National Census, the village's population was 188 in 51 households. The following census in 2011 counted 135 people in 36 households. The 2016 census measured the population of the village as 157 people in 47 households.
