= Talkhab, Bushehr =

Village in Bushehr province, Iran

Talkhab Persian: تلخ اب
- Village
- Location within Iran
- Coordinates: 29°12′32″N 51°30′16″E
- Country: Iran
- Province: Bushehr
- County: Dashtestan
- District: Eram
- Rural District: Eram

Population (2016)
  - Total: 346
- Time zone: UTC+3:30 (IRST)

Talkhab (Persian: تلخ اب) (Note: Also romanized as Talkhāb) is a village in Eram Rural District of Eram District in Dashtestan County, Bushehr province, Iran.

== Demographics ==
=== Population ===
At the time of the 2006 National Census, the village's population was 458 in 90 households. The following census in 2011 counted 359 people in 89 households. The 2016 census measured the population of the village as 346 people in 97 households.
