= Jamileh, Iran =

Village in Bushehr province, Iran

Jamileh Persian: جميله
- Village
- Location within Iran
- Coordinates: 29°22′25″N 51°31′21″E
- Country: Iran
- Province: Bushehr
- County: Dashtestan
- District: Eram
- Rural District: Eram

Population (2016)
  - Total: 197
- Time zone: UTC+3:30 (IRST)

Jamileh (Persian: جميله) (Note: Also romanized as Jamīleh) is a village in Eram Rural District of Eram District in Dashtestan County, Bushehr province, Iran.

== Demographics ==
=== Population ===
At the time of the 2006 National Census, the village's population was 475 in 101 households. The following census in 2011 counted 434 people in 107 households. The 2016 census measured the population of the village as 197 people in 62 households.
