= Anarestan, Dashtestan =

Village in Bushehr province, Iran

Anarestan Persian: انارستان
- Village
- Location within Iran
- Country: Iran
- Province: Bushehr
- County: Dashtestan
- District: Eram
- Rural District: Eram

Population (2016)
  - Total: 18
- Time zone: UTC+3:30 (IRST)

Anarestan (Persian: انارستان) (Note: Also romanized as Ānārestān) is a village in Eram Rural District of Eram District in Dashtestan County, Bushehr province, Iran.

== Demographics ==
=== Population ===
At the time of the 2006 National Census, the village's population was 82 in 20 households. The following census in 2011 counted 39 people in eight households. The 2016 census measured the population of the village as 18 people in eight households.
