= Tang-e Suk =

Village in Bushehr province, Iran

Tang-e Suk Persian: تنگ سوك
- Village
- Location within Iran
- Coordinates: 29°16′43″N 51°27′20″E
- Country: Iran
- Province: Bushehr
- County: Dashtestan
- District: Eram
- Rural District: Eram

Population (2016)
  - Total: Below reporting threshold
- Time zone: UTC+3:30 (IRST)

Tang-e Suk (Persian: تنگ سوك (Note: Also romanized as Tang-e Sūḵ; also known as Tang-e Sok) is a village in Eram Rural District of Eram District in Dashtestan County, Bushehr province, Iran.

== Demographics ==
=== Population ===
At the time of the 2006 National Census, the village's population was 39 in eight households. The village did not appear in the following census of 2011. The 2016 census measured the population of the village as below the reporting threshold.
