= Kheyrak =

Village in Bushehr province, Iran

Kheyrak Persian: خيرك
- Village
- Location within Iran
- Coordinates: 29°15′33″N 51°36′09″E
- Country: Iran
- Province: Bushehr
- County: Dashtestan
- District: Eram
- Rural District: Eram

Population (2016)
  - Total: 251
- Time zone: UTC+3:30 (IRST)

Kheyrak (Persian: خيرك) is a village in Eram Rural District of Eram District in Dashtestan County, Bushehr province, Iran.

== Demographics ==
=== Population ===
At the time of the 2006 National Census, the village's population was 167 in 42 households. The following census in 2011 counted 193 people in 47 households. The 2016 census measured the population of the village as 251 people in 76 households.
