= Mordeh Kheyr =

Village in Bushehr province, Iran

Mordeh Kheyr Persian: مرده خير
- Village
- Location within Iran
- Coordinates: 29°09′18″N 51°37′55″E
- Country: Iran
- Province: Bushehr
- County: Dashtestan
- District: Eram
- Rural District: Dehrud

Population (2016)
  - Total: 232
- Time zone: UTC+3:30 (IRST)

Mordeh Kheyr (Persian: مرده خير) (Note: Also known as Mordeh Khar, Mordeh Kher, Mūrdeh Kheyr, and Murdeh Khir) is a village in Dehrud Rural District of Eram District in Dashtestan County, Bushehr province, Iran.

== Demographics ==
=== Population ===
At the time of the 2006 National Census, the village's population was 177 in 36 households. The following census in 2011 counted 208 people in 55 households. The 2016 census measured the population of the village as 232 people in 63 households.
