= Ab Garmu, Bushehr =

Village in Bushehr province, Iran

Ab Garmu Persian: اب گرمو
- Village
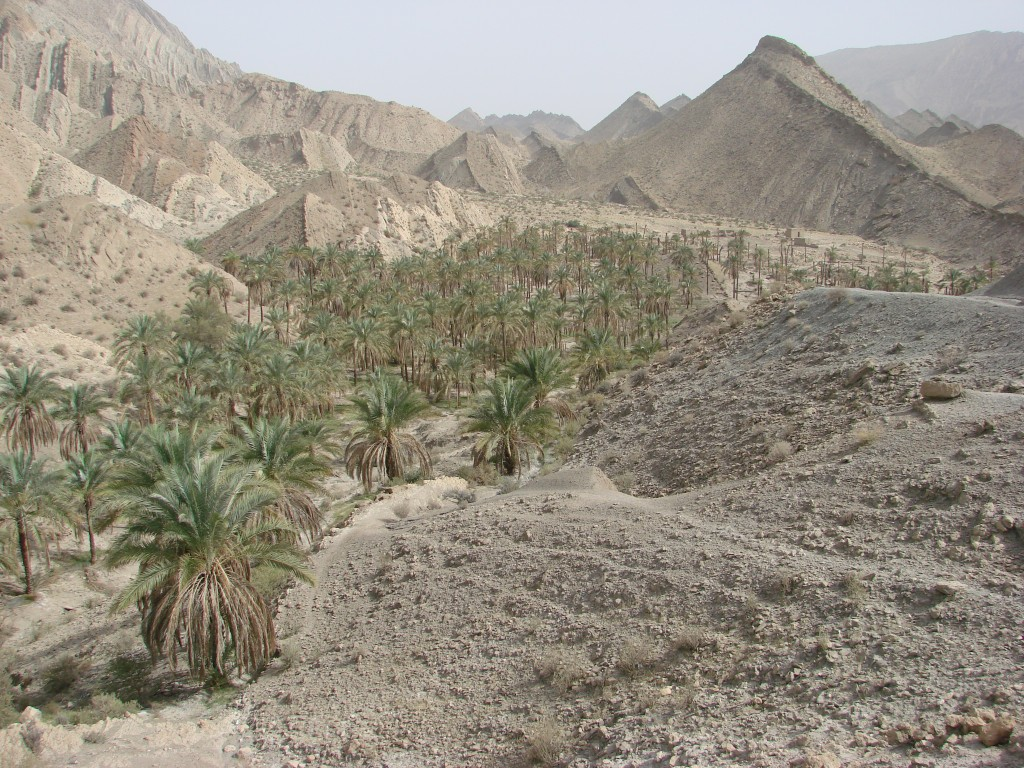
- The village of Ab Garmu

- Location within Iran
- Coordinates: 29°15′12″N 51°31′19″E
- Country: Iran
- Province: Bushehr
- County: Dashtestan
- District: Eram
- Rural District: Eram

Population (2016)
  - Total: Below reporting threshold
- Time zone: UTC+3:30 (IRST)

Ab Garmu (Persian: اب گرمو) (Note: Also romanized as Āb Garmū) is a village in Eram Rural District of Eram District in Dashtestan County, Bushehr province, Iran.

== Demographics ==
=== Population ===
At the time of the 2006 National Census, the village's population was 38 in seven households. The following census in 2011 counted a population below the reporting threshold. The 2016 census again measured the population of the village as below the reporting threshold.
