= Bidu, Dashtestan =

Village in Bushehr province, Iran

Bidu Persian: بيدو
- Village
- Location within Iran
- Coordinates: 29°10′39″N 51°36′12″E
- Country: Iran
- Province: Bushehr
- County: Dashtestan
- District: Eram
- Rural District: Eram

Population (2016)
  - Total: 177
- Time zone: UTC+3:30 (IRST)

Bidu (Persian: بيدو) (Note: Also romanized as Bīdū; also known as Mazra‘eh-ye Bīdū) is a village in Eram Rural District of Eram District in Dashtestan County, Bushehr province, Iran.

== Demographics ==
=== Population ===
At the time of the 2006 National Census, the village's population was 192 in 43 households. The following census in 2011 counted 139 people in 41 households. The 2016 census measured the population of the village as 177 people in 49 households.
