= Bozpar =

Village in Bushehr province, Iran

Bozpar Persian: بزپر
- Village
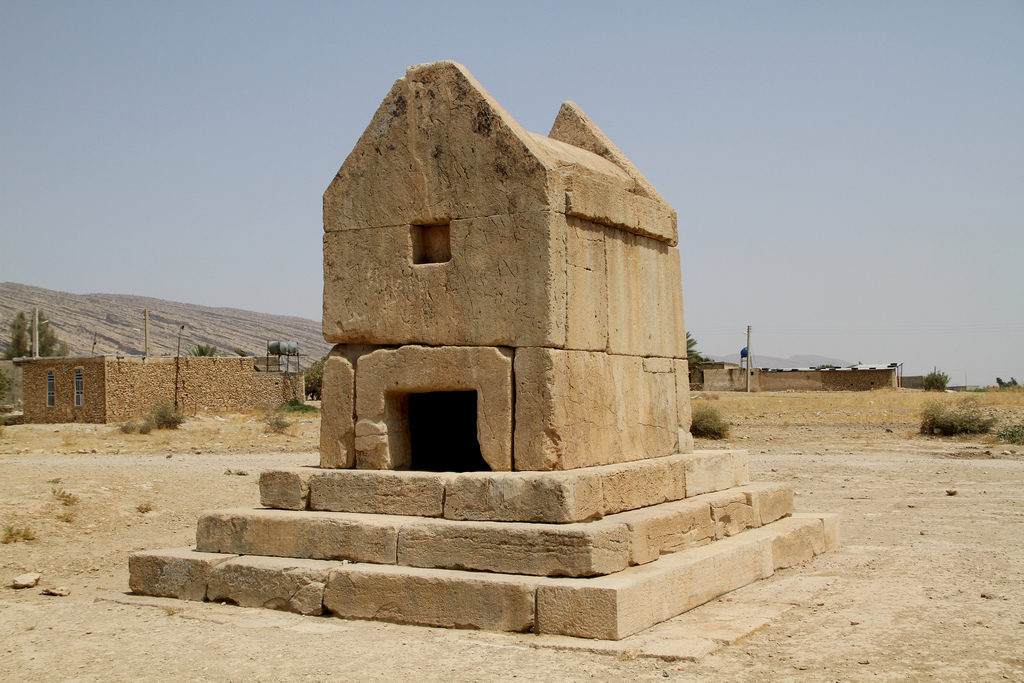
- Gur-e Dokhtar tomb near the village of Bozpar

- Location within Iran
- Country: Iran
- Province: Bushehr
- County: Dashtestan
- District: Eram
- Rural District: Eram

Population (2016)
  - Total: 938
- Time zone: UTC+3:30 (IRST)

Bozpar (Persian: بزپر) (Note: Also known as Būzpar, Poshtpā, and Pusht-i-Pa) is a village in Eram Rural District of Eram District in Dashtestan County, Bushehr province, Iran.

== Demographics ==
=== Population ===
At the time of the 2006 National Census, the village's population was 1,267 in 224 households. The following census in 2011 counted 1,059 people in 242 households. The 2016 census measured the population of the village as 938 people in 242 households.
