= Tang-e Darkash =

Village in Bushehr province, Iran

Tang-e Darkash Persian: تنگ دركش
- Village
- Location within Iran
- Country: Iran
- Province: Bushehr
- County: Dashtestan
- District: Eram
- Rural District: Eram

Population (2016)
  - Total: 149
- Time zone: UTC+3:30 (IRST)

Tang-e Darkash (Persian: تنگ دركش) is a village in Eram Rural District of Eram District in Dashtestan County, Bushehr province, Iran.

== Demographics ==
=== Population ===
At the time of the 2006 National Census, the village's population was 197 in 36 households. The following census in 2011 counted 184 people in 39 households. The 2016 census measured the population of the village as 149 people in 39 households.
