= Chavak, Bushehr =

Village in Bushehr province, Iran

Chavak Persian: چاوك
- Village
- Country: Iran
- Province: Bushehr
- County: Dashtestan
- District: Eram
- Rural District: Dehrud

Population (2016)
  - Total: 0
- Time zone: UTC+3:30 (IRST)

Chavak (Persian: چاوك) (Note: Also romanized as Chāvaḵ) is a village in Dehrud Rural District of Eram District in Dashtestan County, Bushehr province, Iran.

== Demographics ==
=== Population ===
At the time of the 2006 National Census, the village's population was 526 in 97 households. The following census in 2011 counted 336 people in 76 households. The 2016 census measured the population of the village as zero.
