= Jamghari =

Village in Bushehr province, Iran

Jamghari Persian: جمغاري
- Village
- Location within Iran
- Country: Iran
- Province: Bushehr
- County: Dashtestan
- District: Eram
- Rural District: Eram

Population (2016)
  - Total: 72
- Time zone: UTC+3:30 (IRST)

Jamghari (Persian: جمغاري) (Note: Also romanized as Jamghārī) is a village in Eram Rural District of Eram District in Dashtestan County, Bushehr province, Iran.

== Demographics ==
=== Population ===
At the time of the 2006 National Census, the village's population was 58 in 11 households. The following census in 2011 counted 51 people in 16 households. The 2016 census measured the population of the village as 72 people in 18 households.
