= Nasad, Iran =

Village in Bushehr province, Iran

Nasad Persian: نصاد
- Village
- Country: Iran
- Province: Bushehr
- County: Dashtestan
- District: Eram
- Rural District: Dehrud

Population (2016)
  - Total: Below reporting threshold
- Time zone: UTC+3:30 (IRST)

Nasad (Persian: نصاد) is a village in Dehrud Rural District of Eram District in Dashtestan County, Bushehr province, Iran.

== Demographics ==
=== Population ===
The village did not appear in the 2006 National Census. The following census in 2011 counted 26 people in five households. The 2016 census measured the population of the village as below the reporting threshold.
