= Shekarak =

Village in Bushehr province, Iran

Shekarak Persian: شكرك
- Village
- Location within Iran
- Coordinates: 29°16′36″N 51°34′52″E
- Country: Iran
- Province: Bushehr
- County: Dashtestan
- District: Eram
- Rural District: Eram

Population (2016)
  - Total: 215
- Time zone: UTC+3:30 (IRST)

Shekarak (Persian: شكرك) is a village in Eram Rural District of Eram District in Dashtestan County, Bushehr province, Iran.

== Demographics ==
=== Population ===
At the time of the 2006 National Census, the village's population was 173 in 43 households. The following census in 2011 counted 233 people in 49 households. The 2016 census measured the population of the village as 215 people in 59 households.
