= Kam Zard, Bushehr =

Village in Bushehr province, Iran

Kam Zard Persian: كم زرد
- Village
- Location within Iran
- Coordinates: 29°06′58″N 51°34′23″E
- Country: Iran
- Province: Bushehr
- County: Dashtestan
- District: Eram
- Rural District: Dehrud

Population (2016)
  - Total: 146
- Time zone: UTC+3:30 (IRST)

Kam Zard (Persian: كم زرد) (Note: Also known as Kamar Zard) is a village in Dehrud Rural District of Eram District in Dashtestan County, Bushehr province, Iran.

== Demographics ==
=== Population ===
At the time of the 2006 National Census, the village's population was 145 in 29 households. The following census in 2011 counted 121 people in 28 households. The 2016 census measured the population of the village as 146 people in 36 households.
