= Porganak =

Village in Bushehr province, Iran

Porganak Persian: پرگانك
- Village
- Location within Iran
- Coordinates: 29°06′42″N 51°32′14″E
- Country: Iran
- Province: Bushehr
- County: Dashtestan
- District: Eram
- Rural District: Dehrud

Population (2016)
  - Total: 638
- Time zone: UTC+3:30 (IRST)

Porganak (Persian: پرگانك) (Note: Also romanized as Porgānaḵ; also known as Parchūnag, Porgūnak, and Porjānak) is a village in Dehrud Rural District of Eram District in Dashtestan County, Bushehr province, Iran.

== Demographics ==
=== Population ===
At the time of the 2006 National Census, the village's population was 670 in 140 households. The following census in 2011 counted 640 people in 178 households. The 2016 census measured the population of the village as 638 people in 198 households.
