= Subaru Legacy (fifth generation) =

Fifth generation of Subaru Legacy

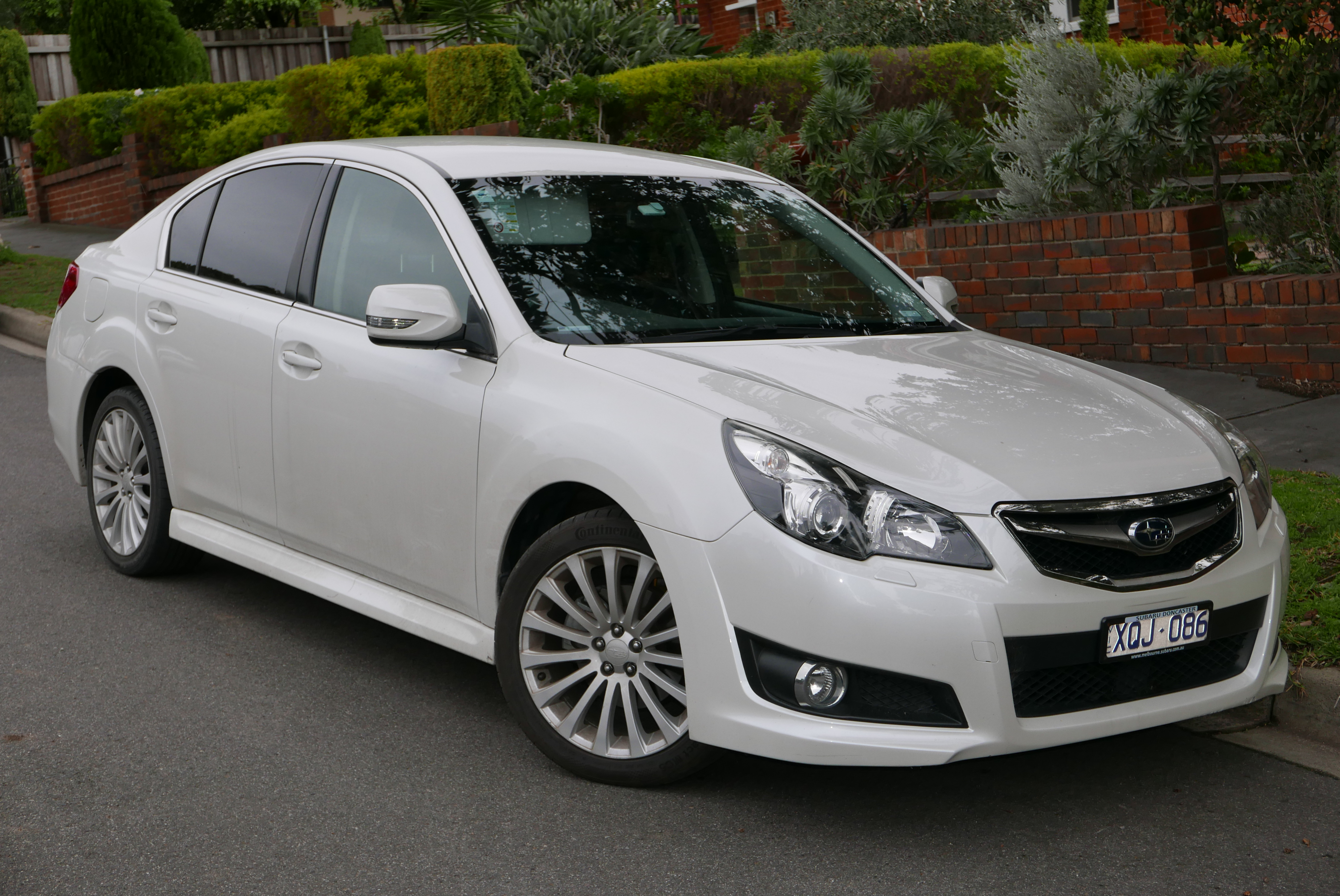

Overview
- Manufacturer: Subaru (Fuji Heavy Industries)
- Model code: BM/BR
- Also called: Legacy B4 (sedan); Legacy Touring Wagon; Subaru Liberty (Australia)
- Production: 2009–2014
- Model years: 2010–2014 (North America)
- Assembly: Ōta, Gunma, Japan; Lafayette, Indiana, United States (SIA)

Body and chassis
- Body style: 4-door sedan 5-door crossover SUV (Outback); 5-door station wagon
- Layout: front engine, variable assist 4 wheel drive
- Related: Subaru Tribeca; Subaru Exiga; Subaru Outback

Powertrain
- Engine: Gasoline: 2.0 L EJ204 DOHC AVCS H4; 2.0 L FA20 DOHC turbo AVCS H4; 2.5 L EJ253 SOHC i-AVLS H4; 2.5 L FB25 DOHC DAVCS H4; 2.5 L EJ255 DOHC turbo DAVCS H4; 3.6 L EZ36 DOHC DAVCS H6; Diesel: 2.0 L DOHC EE20 turbo H4
- Transmission: TR690 Lineartronic CVT; 5-speed 5EAT automatic 6-speed TY756 manual

Dimensions
- Wheelbase: 2,751 mm (108.3 in)
- Length: 2010-12 Sedan: 4,735 mm (186.4 in); Wagon: 4,775 mm (188.0 in); 2013- Sedan: 4,755 mm (187.2 in)
- Width: 1,821 mm (71.7 in); Wagon: 1,780 mm (70.1 in)
- Height: 1,506 mm (59.3 in); Wagon: 1,535 mm (60.4 in)
- Curb weight: 1,613 kg (3,557 lb) (3.6R Limited)

Chronology
- Predecessor: Subaru Legacy (fourth generation)
- Successor: Subaru Legacy (sixth generation); Subaru Levorg (wagon model)

The fifth-generation Subaru Legacy was originally unveiled as a concept car at the 2009 North American International Auto Show in Detroit to commemorate the 20th anniversary of the model, and the production version was introduced at the 2009 New York International Auto Show. Production of the fifth generation started on 29 May 2009.

== Summary ==
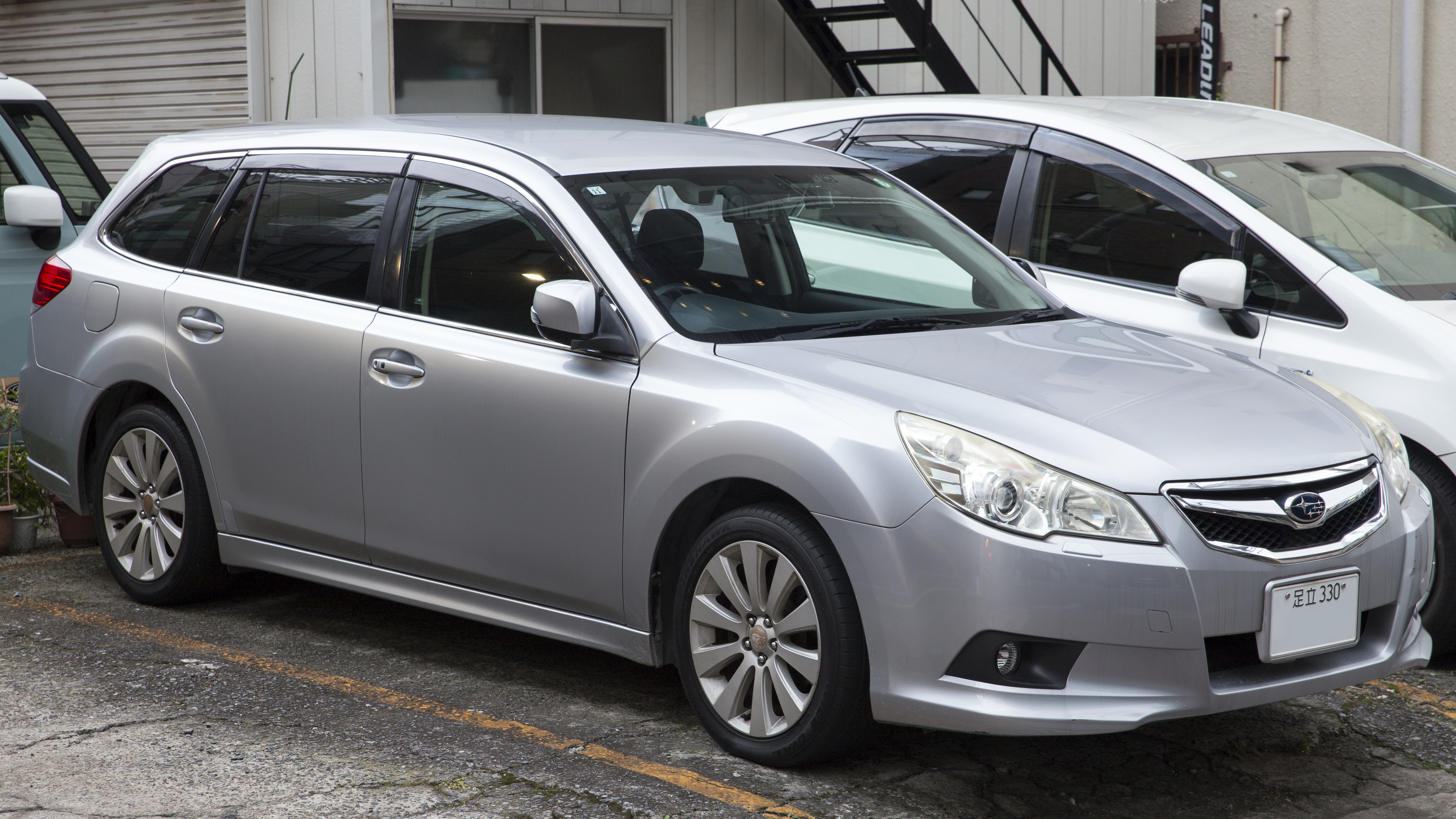
2010 Subaru Legacy 2.5i-L Touring Wagon (Japan)

Several design traditions came to an end with the advent of the fifth generation. The side windows are no longer frameless, ending a Subaru tradition started with the first generation Leone in the early 1970s. On wagons, the "D" pillar is no longer covered in glass. The parking light switch, traditionally installed on top of the steering wheel column, has also been removed. An engine coolant temperature gauge is no longer offered, replaced by a fuel economy gauge that provides estimates in either miles per gallon or liters per 100 kilometers, depending on the regional requirements where the vehicle is sold. When the engine temperature is below normal, an indicator light illuminates blue, and when the engine overheats, the light turns red. Using the key to unlock the driver's door after locking the vehicle with the remote will trigger the security system; the vehicle must be unlocked with the remote, a tradition dating back to the second generation when remote keyless access was introduced.

The manual parking brake handle, located between the front passenger seats, has been replaced with an electric parking brake switch installed on the dashboard, next to the driver's door. The term "Hill Holder" has returned but is now integrated with the electric parking brake. VDC is now standard on all models currently offered internationally. The vehicle has also added safety technologies such as Electronic Stability Control, Brake Assist, and Electronic Brakeforce Distribution to the list of standard features. The external "Limited" badge, introduced in 1998, has been retired on North American vehicles. If the vehicle features the 3.6 L six-cylinder engine, a "3.6R" badge is applied to the rear of the vehicle on the bottom right side. If the vehicle has a diesel engine, a badge that says "Boxer Diesel" is installed on the middle right rear side of the vehicle. Gasoline turbocharged vehicles can be visually identified with a front hood (bonnet) installed air scoop and symmetrical dual exhaust pipes below the rear bumper.

Subaru introduced improvements to the chassis, which they call the Dynamic Chassis Control Concept, which uses high-tensile steel in critical areas to achieve high strength with lighter weight. The front-end structure features a Cradle Mount that isolates the suspension and engine from the passenger compartment, providing a smoother and quieter ride through the use of rubber mounts. New for this generation is a double wishbone rear suspension, with all suspension links and the rear differential isolated from the rear subframe with large rubber mounts to minimize noise and vibration intruding into the passenger compartment.

=== North American models ===
Model	Transmission
2.5i, 2.5i Premium	6-speed manual or Lineartronic CVT
2.5i Limited, PZEV (all trim levels)	Lineartronic CVT
2.5GT Premium, 2.5GT Limited	6-speed manual
3.6R, 3.6R Premium, 3.6R Limited	5-speed automatic

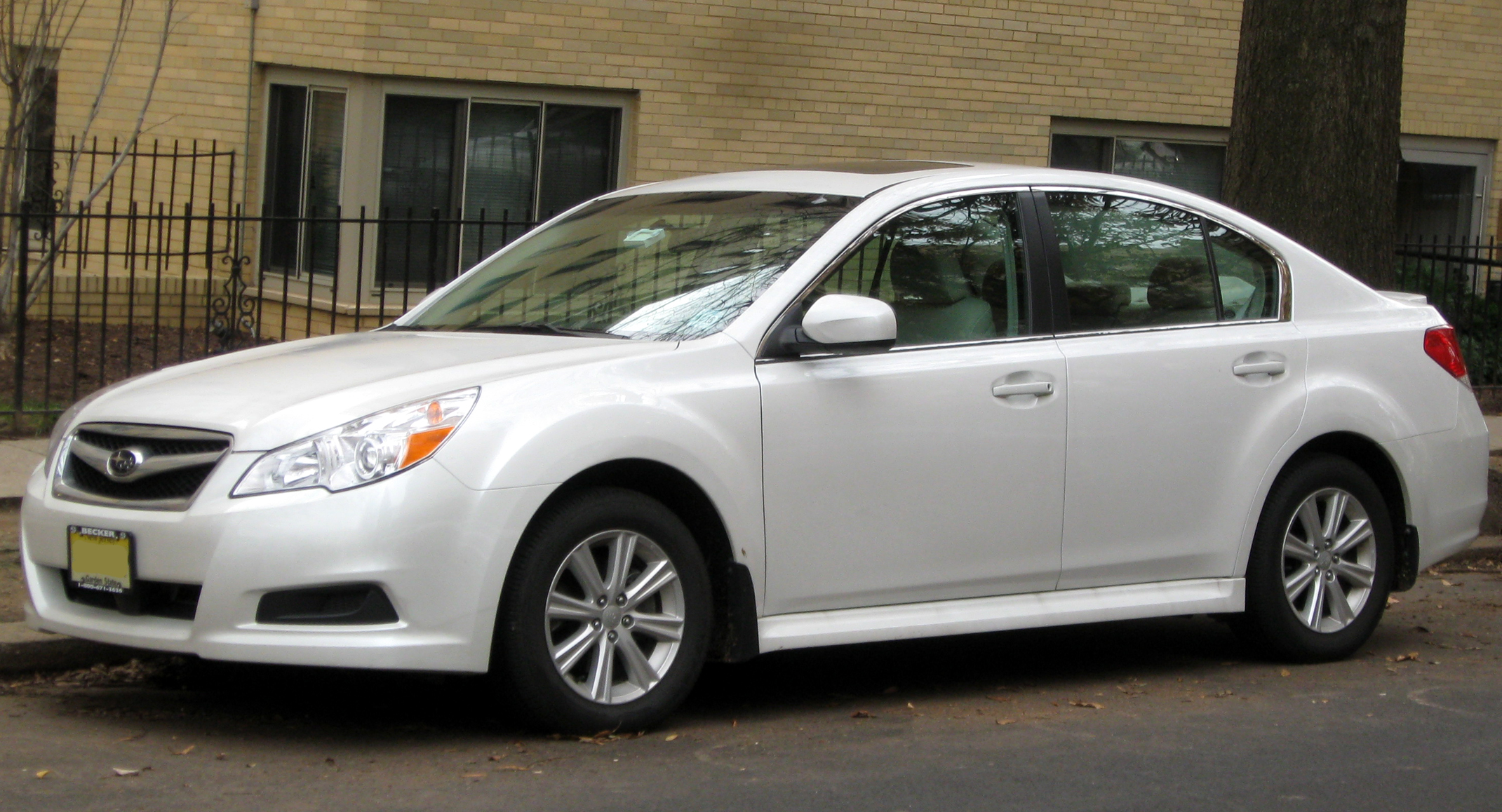
2010-2012 Subaru Legacy sedan

The interior is available in 2 colors (Warm Ivory or Off-Black) with leather offered on Limited trim packages. Standard on Limited models, and optional on Premium models, is a 440 W, 9-speaker Harman/Kardon audio system using Dolby Pro Logic II technology and DTS Digital Sound is standard, with Bluetooth and iPod capability, and an optional 8- voice activated GPS touch screen navigation system. A Harman/Kardon sourced stereo with a single disc in-dash CD player and SRS Circle Surround sound is the standard sound system offered with four speakers on all other models. A separate Bluetooth wireless package with voice recognition, called Blueconnect, is available as an optional add-on on all trim packages that do not include the GPS/stereo package. It is installed in the center of the dashboard, below the standard sound system, and is not offered internationally. Black housing for headlights is not offered on North American models. The front hood (bonnet) and front bumper covers are unique to the North American market due to slight changes in the sheet metal in comparison to those items used internationally. This is due to the North American Outback grille sharing a more prominent appearance, also used on the third-generation Forester and the facelifted Tribeca. The hood and front bumper are shared on North American Legacies and Outbacks.

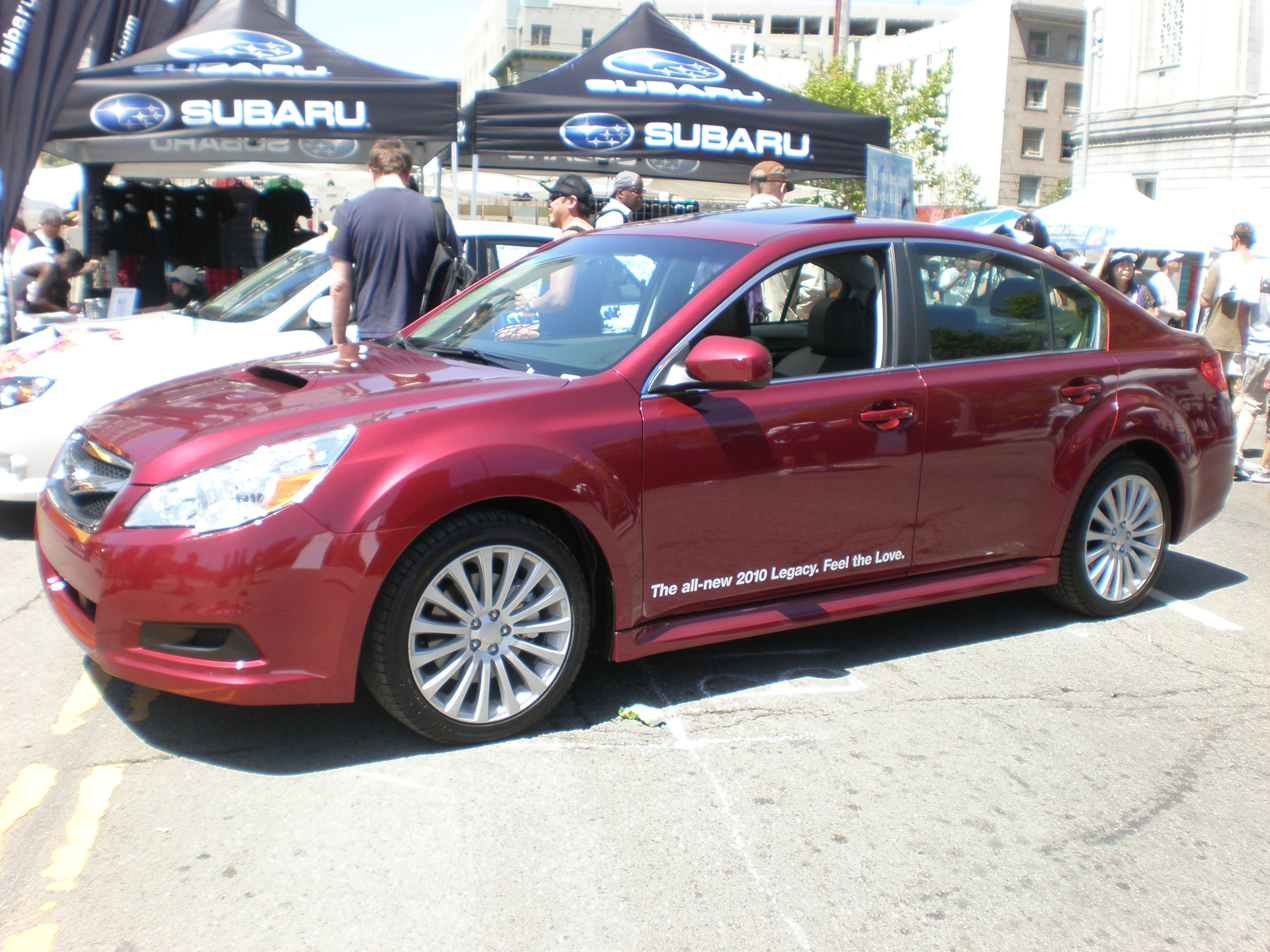
2010 Subaru Legacy 2.5GT

A dual-zone climate control system is standard and available only on Limited trim designations with a 6-speed fan; the standard air conditioning/heating system has a 4-speed fan. Lower trim levels have silver metallic trim on the interior door panels and dashboard, with woodgrain on Limited vehicles. An optional LED accessory lighting package in blue can be installed for the front passenger footwells and a matching illuminated sill panel for the front doors. Oddly, the North American version features exposed cupholders without a retractable cover, whereas international versions have a retractable cover for the console-installed cupholders. For the 2011 model year, the 2.5GT received some interior changes, replacing the woodgrain inserts on the doors and dashboard with faux carbon fiber inserts already offered on Legacy models internationally, along with contrasting stitching on the black leather interior, similar to the Japanese version, and aluminum cross-drilled pedals. XM Satellite Radio is also offered on Premium and Limited trim packages.

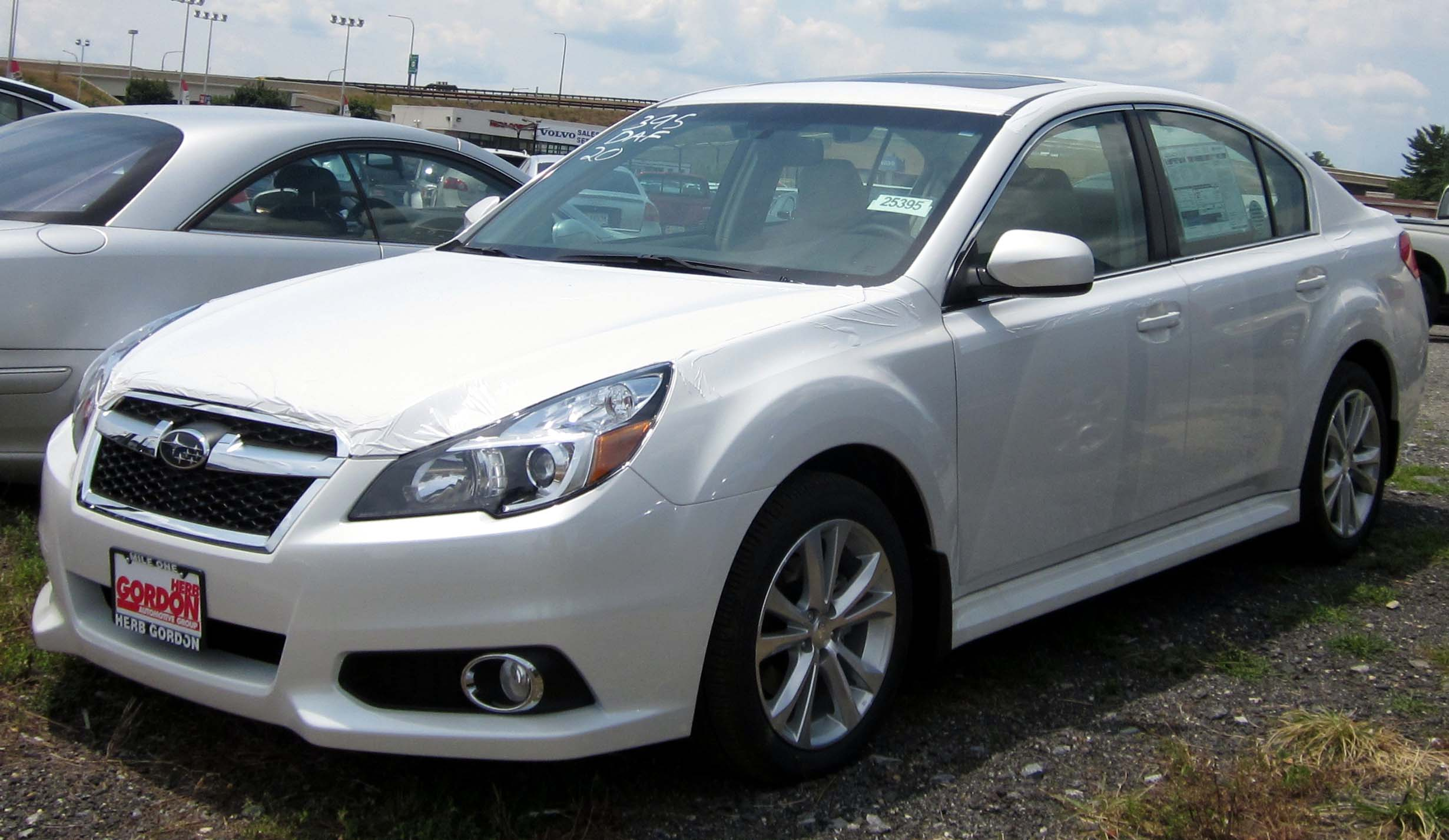
2013 Subaru Legacy 2.5i Limited

All models include painted exterior door handles, with black exterior side mirrors on the base level 2.5i sedan. Turn signal repeaters are no longer integrated into the side exterior mirrors, unlike in the previous generation. However, for the 2011 model year, the exterior mirrors can be manually folded in. The 2.5i model remains certified as a PZEV and is available for sale in all 50 states, with a badge displayed on the right rear side of the vehicle. Other models have been certified LEV2 or ULEV. Premium unleaded fuel is required for vehicles identified as GT, where the engines are equipped with a turbocharger. The 2.5 L flat-4 engine without a turbo is available with a six-speed manual transmission, a characteristic shared with Australia only.

=== Marketing ===
In 2010, Subaru introduced an advertising campaign to market their 2011 Legacy (Mediocrity (advertising campaign). The campaign, which was a parody, included a series of television advertisements and a microsite. The 2011 "Mediocrity" was a basic, beige four-door mid-size sedan that featured an exterior design to a 2001-2006 Hyundai Sonata or Kia Optima with modified styling. On the website for the 2011 Mediocrity, a link to the 2011 Subaru Legacy was provided, noting that website visitors should click the link if they are looking for a more exciting vehicle.

=== Japanese models ===
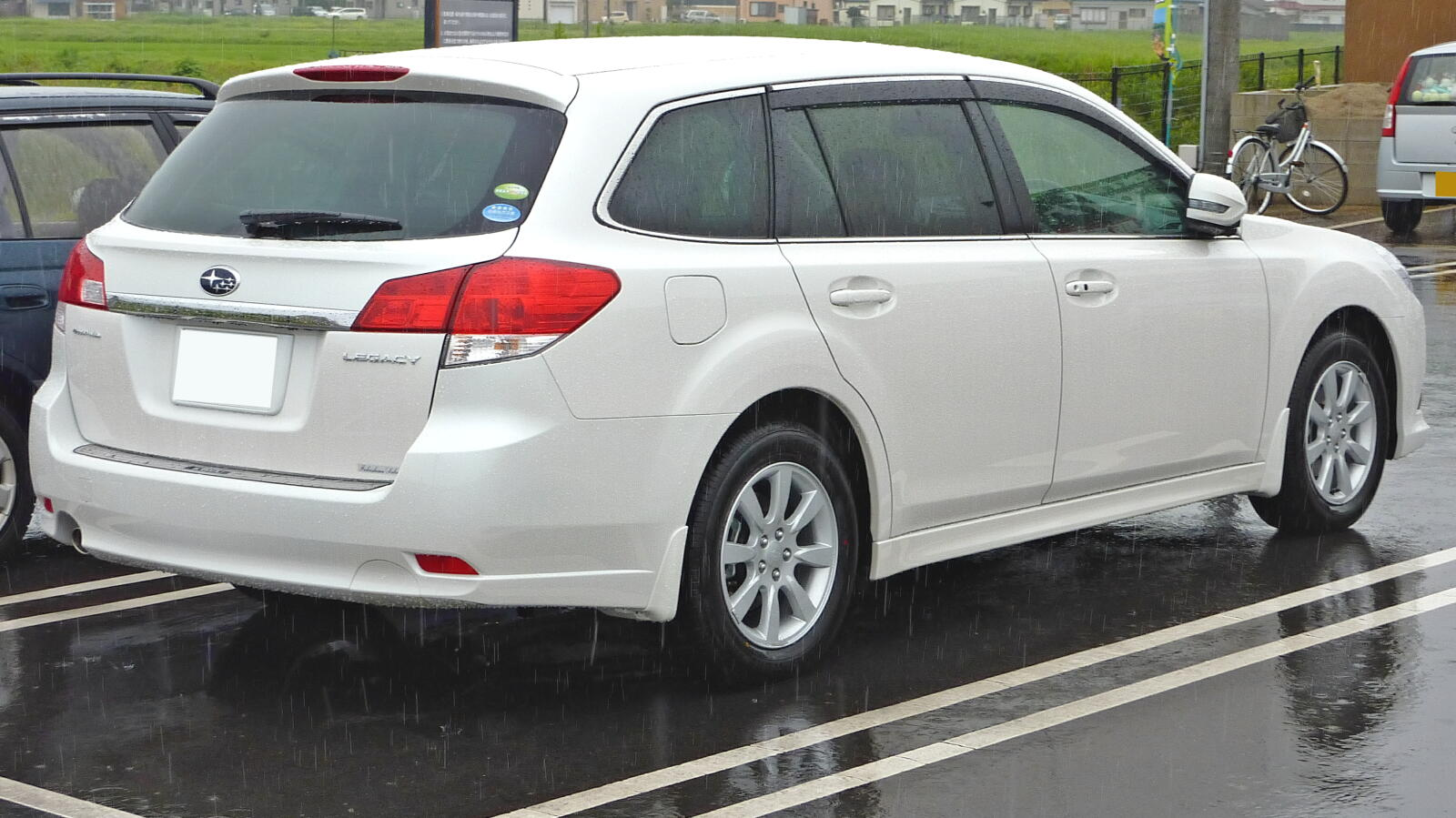
2010 Subaru Legacy 2.5i-L Touring Wagon (Japan) with turn signals integrated into folded side view mirror

Model	Transmission
2.5i (base, L Package, S Package)	Lineartronic CVT
2.5GT (base, L Package, SI-Cruise)	5-speed automatic
2.5GT S Package	5-speed automatic or 6-speed manual (2009-2011)
2.0GT DIT	Lineartronic CVT (2012-)

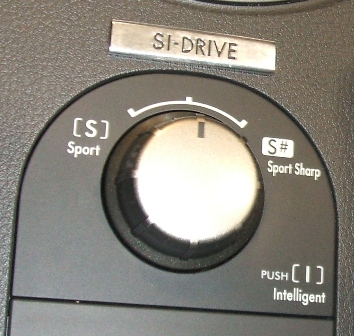
SI-Drive control knob (earlier version)

SI-Drive, or Subaru Intelligent-Drive , (Japanese: SI-Drive) is standard equipment on all trim versions. It is a feature that enables three distinctly different modes of vehicle performance characteristics (identified as "Sport", "Sport Sharp", and "Intelligent") by regulating the engine control unit (ECU), the automatic transmission control unit (TCU, if equipped), and by fine-tuning the electronically controlled throttle. The SI-Drive control knob is installed on the center console between the heated front seat control switches. The "Intelligent" mode makes throttle response more gradual and decreases maximum engine power by 10 percent. The "Sport" mode enables the engine to operate at higher speeds, resulting in a 5 percent increase in fuel efficiency compared to Subaru engines without this feature. The "Sport # (Sharp)" mode makes throttle response more abrupt and enables the automatic transmission to maintain higher RPMs within a given gear's range, and minimizes steering wheel effort. When the engine is started, the default setting is the "Sport" selection. SI-Cruise is an autonomous cruise control system that can reduce or resume a preset speed, or bring the vehicle to a complete stop if the system detects that a slower vehicle is being followed, without driver intervention.

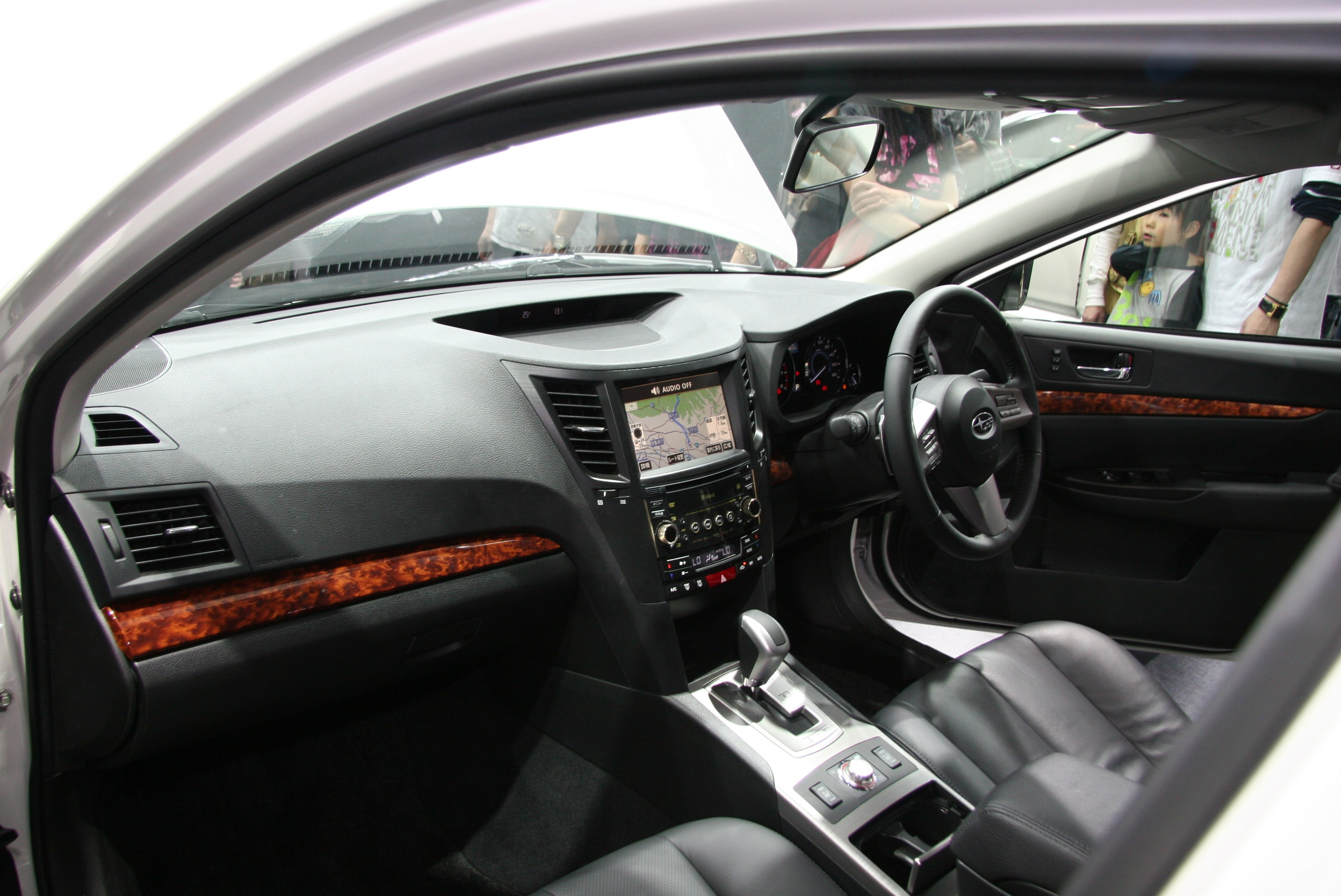
Subaru Legacy 2.5GT SI-Cruise interior (with McIntosh stereo)

Japanese buyers can choose two different premium level entertainment systems; they can select the previously described Harman/Kardon GPS-stereo with six speakers, or a McIntosh sourced GPS/stereo with Dolby Digital 5.1 Surround Sound, a separate powered amplifier and 10 speakers. Both units are Gracenote, G-BOOK and VICS enabled, with both systems available with an internal 600 MHz 40GB HDD coupled with a digital TV tuner that can be watched when the transmission is in park and the parking brake applied. Both stereos are compatible with CD, CD-R/RW, DVD, and DVD R/RW as well as MP3 and WMA music formats. A Harman/Kardon-sourced stereo with a 6-disc in-dash CD changer and SRS Circle Surround sound is the entry-level sound system, offered with six speakers and standard equipment. The center dashboard trim is color-matched to the stereo installed; if it features Harman/Kardon units, the trim color is silver brushed aluminum, and if the McIntosh system is installed, the trim color is black brushed aluminum. The climate controls are also colored either silver or black.

Both GPS navigation systems can be displayed in a split screen format that shows both two- and three-dimensional views with graphic landmarks. Trim panels on the doors and the dashboard can be exchanged for an optional second woodgrain appearance or carbon fiber. The front and rear bumper covers can also be exchanged for Subaru-designed aero-effects, allowing the buyer to install two types of mesh grilles, a choice of two front fog light selections, and a choice of oval or trapezoidal dual rear exhaust ports in chrome. A rear wiper is still available as an optional feature on the back of the sedan, a tradition established with the first-generation Legacy. The Warm Ivory interior color is only available on vehicles with the "L" package and SI-Cruise models. All other trim levels are available with a black interior and black cloth upholstery, with leather offered as an optional upgrade on the "L" package and SI-Cruise models. The dual-zone climate control system is standard on all trim levels.

A smart key is available as an option coupled with a two-position memory seat that memorizes driver's seat positions and adjustments, exterior mirror adjustments, and climate control settings. The settings can be customized based on the smart key module being used to unlock and start the car. Turn signal repeaters are still integrated into the side exterior mirrors on all Japanese-spec models. The black leather interior installed on vehicles with the "S" package can be fitted with optional black corduroy inserts with white contrasting French stitching on all visible seams and aluminum cross-drilled brake, clutch, and accelerator pedals. The Legacy wagon can be fitted with twin white LED lights installed on the interior hatch, vertically surrounding the rear window, with a separate light switch for additional illumination when the rear hatch is open. An optional LED accessory lighting package in either white or blue can be installed for the front and rear passenger footwells and a matching illuminated sill panel for the front and rear doors, and the standard overhead dome light can be exchanged for white LED as well.

HID headlights are standard equipment on all trim levels except the base 2.5i, coupled with headlight washers. Rain-sensing automatic wipers are also available. A choice between two backup cameras can be installed, along with front parking assist sensors. Bilstein struts remain available for enhanced performance handling. Air vents are installed for rear passengers at the back of the center front armrest compartment. According to the JDM STi Accessories brochure for the fifth generation Legacy sold in Japan, buyers can choose from several options to include stiffer springs for the suspension, short throw gear shift, and specially designed 18 inch alloy wheels from BBS and ENKEI.

On the first anniversary of the introduction of the fifth generation, "EyeSight" was once again offered on the Touring Wagon only. EyeSight consists of 2 cameras with one on each side of the interior rear view mirror, which use human-like stereoscopic vision to judge distances and generally keep tabs on the driver. The system can help maintain a safe distance on the highway, a lane departure warning system, a wake-up call when traffic lights change, and even keep an eye out for pedestrians. SI-Cruise has been integrated into the EyeSight feature as a driver safety aid.

==== Legacy 2.5GT tS ====
In June 2010, the Legacy 2.5GT tS or tuned by STI (Subaru Tecnica International) was released for the Japanese Domestic Market. Built in a limited edition of 600 units, the 2.5GT tS is available as a B4 Sedan and Touring Wagon.

The modifications focused on sharper handling and improved ride quality. The STI flexible tower bar, Bilstein inverted struts with stiffer springs, front flexible low stiffeners, and rear pillow-ball, along with a reinforced front crossmember, means the 2.5GT tS has more rigidity and better steering feedback.

With front lip spoiler, 18 inch alloys, sport exhaust system, "tS" grille emblem, lip trunk spoiler (B4 Sedan), or roof spoiler (Touring Wagon), the Legacy 2.5GT tS has a sportier appearance than the regular 2.5GT.

Inside, the 2.5GT tS features black leather and Alcantara sports seats with red seams and an STI label, titanium-finished instrument panels, and an STI logo on the speedometer, steering wheel, shift lever, engine start/stop button, and floor mats.

==== Legacy 2.0GT DIT ====
Starting May 8, 2012, Subaru replaced the EJ engine series with the new FA and FB engine series, co-developed with Toyota. The FB25 is used on all trim packages, with the FA20 equipped with a turbocharger called the Legacy GT DIT (Direct Injection Turbo).

=== United Kingdom models ===
Model	Transmission
2.5i (SE, SE NavPlus)	Lineartronic CVT
2.0D Turbodiesel (S, SE, SE NavPlus)	six-speed manual

Currently, only the wagon, called Legacy Tourer, is available to United Kingdom buyers with a choice of the Subaru EE turbodiesel with a six-speed manual transmission only or the 2.5 L with the continuously variable transmission only. The 3.6 L flat-6 engine and the turbocharged gasoline engine are not offered. The interior is available in black only, with cloth interior available on the 2.0D S base model and leather on all other trim levels. The interior trim strips on the doors and dashboard are silver on the base model and carbon fiber on all other models. The front bumper and bonnet utilize the Japanese configuration, which includes self-leveling HID headlights and headlight washers. The SE model has a sporty front bumper. The UK and Europe are offered an exterior paint selection, called Camellia Red Pearl, that is not available in Japan or North America. Bilstein struts are standard on all trim levels except the 2.0D S. The dual-zone climate-control system is standard on all trim levels. All engines offered in the Legacy are Euro5 compliant. For vehicle security, a Thatcham Category 1 perimeter alarm and immobilizer, along with a rolling-code ECU engine immobilizer, are standard equipment.

The smart key is available on NavPlus models only using the Harman/Kardon GPS-stereo unit, and the two-position memory seat is available on all models except the 2.0D S trim level. 16-inch alloy wheels are standard on the 2.0D S model, and 18-inch alloy wheels are standard on all other models. Rain-sensing automatic wipers are standard on all models, along with heated exterior mirrors, a glass moonroof, heated front seats, fog lights, and a tilt-and-telescoping steering wheel. The Harman/Kardon GPS/stereo system, featuring six speakers and a rear-view backup camera, is installed only on vehicles equipped with the voice recognition NavPlus system. The standard stereo system features a Harman/Kardon-sourced in-dash six-disc CD auto-changer.

=== European models ===
Model	Transmission
2.5i (Trend, Comfort, Sport)	Lineartronic CVT
2.5GT (No longer for sale)	5-speed automatic
2.0D Turbodiesel (Trend, Active, Comfort, Sport)	6-speed manual
2.0i (Trend, Active, Comfort)	6-speed manual or Lineartronic CVT

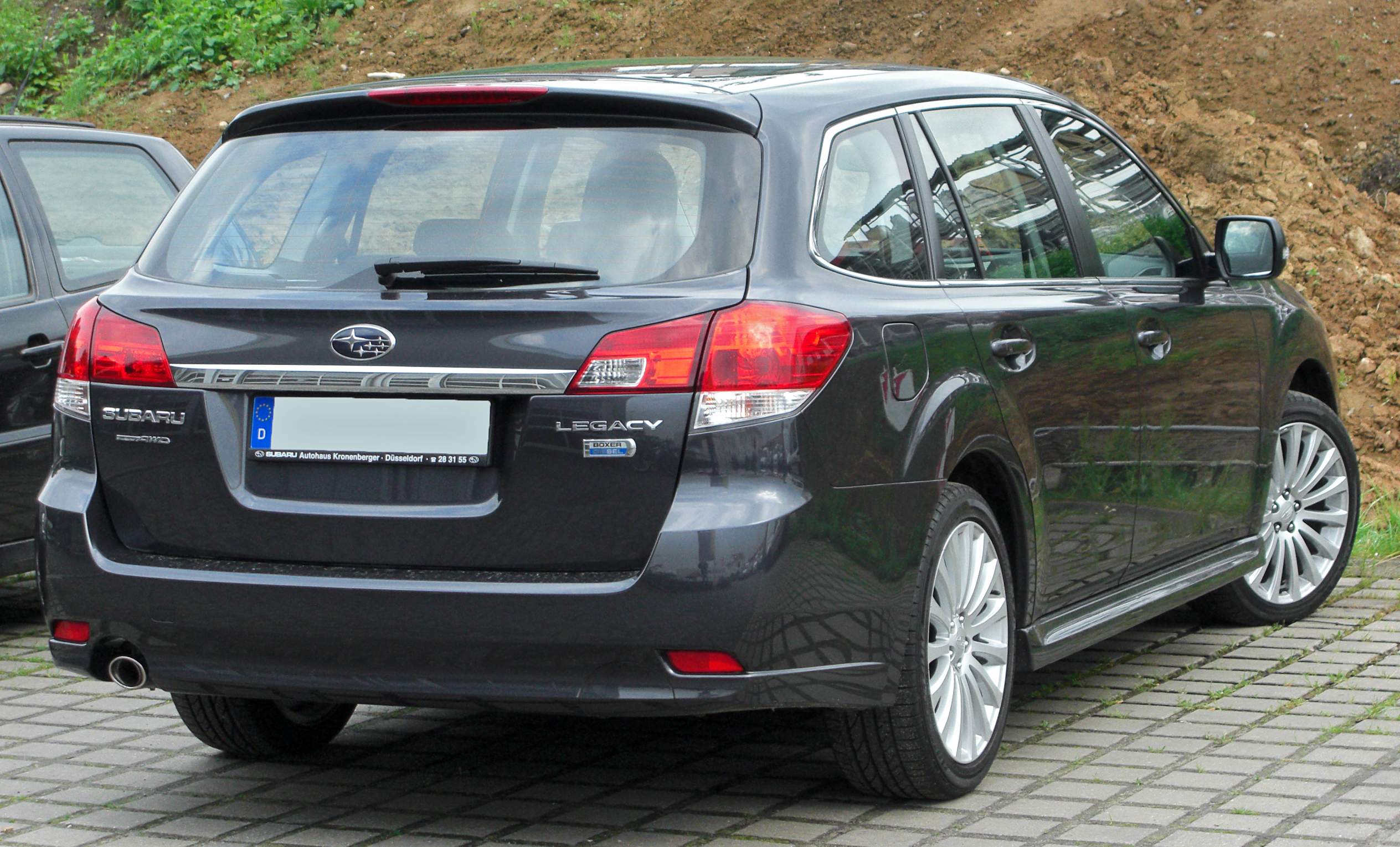
2010 Subaru Legacy 2.0D Touring Wagon

The European Legacy is available in either sedan or wagon form, and the engine choices include the flat-4 EE20 2.0L turbodiesel, the EJ20 2.0L, and the EJ25 2.5L. The Legacy GT, featuring the EJ25 turbocharged engine and a 5-speed automatic transmission, has been available in select European countries. It has been phased out since (no official explanation has been presented). Even though its more rugged brother, the Outback, is available with a 3.6 L flat-6 engine, the currently most powerful engine choice for the Legacy sold on the European market is the naturally aspirated 170 HP (130 kW) 2.5 L, coupled with a Lineartronic gearbox. The interior colors of Warm Ivory or Off-Black are offered, but Warm Ivory is only available in leather. Carbon Fiber accents are only available on the Sport trim package with black leather interior. The dual-zone climate control system is standard on all trim levels. The turbodiesel is available with the Warm Ivory interior, featuring the Harman/Kardon GPS sound system with six speakers and satellite navigation. However, the only transmission offered is the six-speed manual transmission. All engines except turbocharged EJ25 are Euro5 compliant.

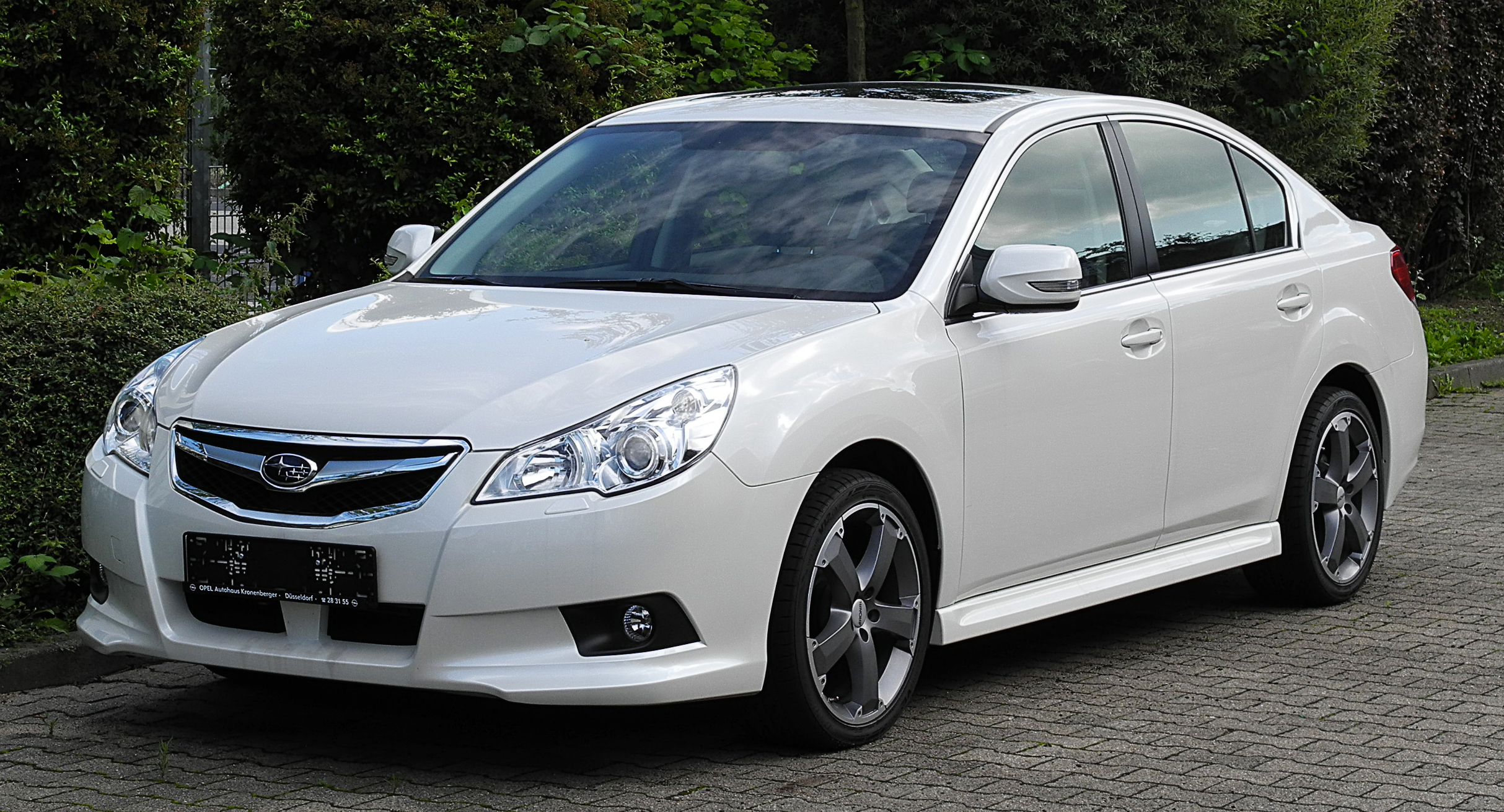
Subaru Legacy 2.0i Comfort

Cruise control, heated seats, automatic windshield wipers, HID headlights with headlight washers, heated exterior mirrors, glass moonroof, and 17" wheels are standard equipment. 18" alloy wheels are standard on the top-level trim packages Comfort and Sport. The smart key is available only on the Sport or Comfort trim packages, coupled with the Harman/Kardon satellite navigation system and memory seats. The front hood (bonnet) and front bumper covers utilize the Japanese configuration, featuring turn signal repeaters on the exterior mirrors and standard front and rear fog lights. Japan and Europe are offered an exterior paint selection, called Dark Amethyst Silica, that is not available in the UK or North America.

=== South African models ===
Model	Transmission
2.5i (Sport Premium)	Lineartronic CVT
2.0i (Premium)	6-speed manual or Lineartronic CVT

The Legacy is offered as a sedan with a black interior; its specifications are similar to those of the European "Comfort" trim package. The Legacy 2.0i Premium comes with the choice of a six-speed manual transmission or Lineartronic CVT, leather trim, a power driver's front seat with memory function, dual-zone climate control, an electric sunroof, and 16 inch alloy wheels. The Legacy 2.5i Sport Premium CVT adds dual front electric seats, carbon-fiber dash inserts, alloy pedals, sports front bumper and grille; Bilstein suspension, 18-inch alloy wheels, and Xenon headlights with headlight washers to the Premium package. Satellite navigation is not offered along with the premium Harman/Kardon sound system.

=== Australian model ===
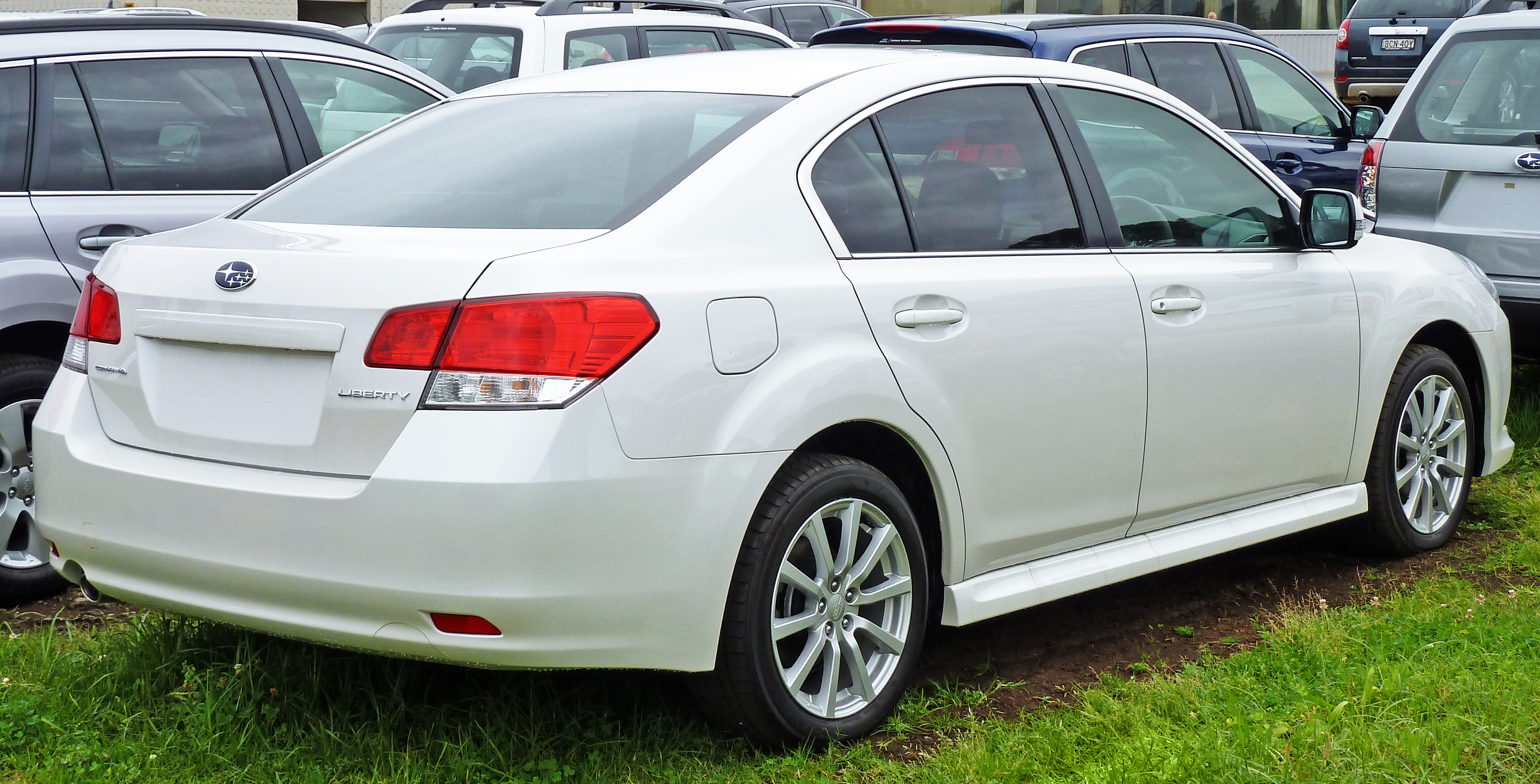
2010 Subaru Liberty (MY10) 2.5i sedan

Model	Transmission
2.5i	6-speed manual or Lineartronic CVT
2.5i Premium, 2.5i Premium SatNav	Lineartronic CVT
2.5i Sports, 2.5i Sports Premium, 2.5i Sports Premium SatNav	Lineartronic CVT
2.5GT Premium SatNav	6-speed manual or 5-speed automatic
3.6R Premium SatNav	5-speed automatic

The Liberty sedan and wagon sold in Australia resemble the vehicle sold in Europe, with some features only available in Japan. The engines offered are the EJ25, EZ36, and the EJ25 with a turbo. Australians can choose either the Lineartronic CVT or a 6-speed manual transmission on the 2.5i, a 6-speed manual or 5-speed automatic transmission on the 2.5GT, but transmission choices on the EZ36 are limited to the 5-speed automatic. The Off Black interior color is standard across the range; however, the Warm Ivory is available on the 3.6R, with leather interior offered on vehicles identified as "Premium". Cloth is offered on the 2.5i in black only. SI-Drive is offered on the 3.6R or the 2.5GT. The front bumper and hood (bonnet) use the Japanese configuration. Bilstein struts are standard equipment on all vehicles identified as 2.5i Sports and the 2.5GT turbo. The 2.5i Sports models and the 2.5GT can be identified by black housing for the HID headlights.

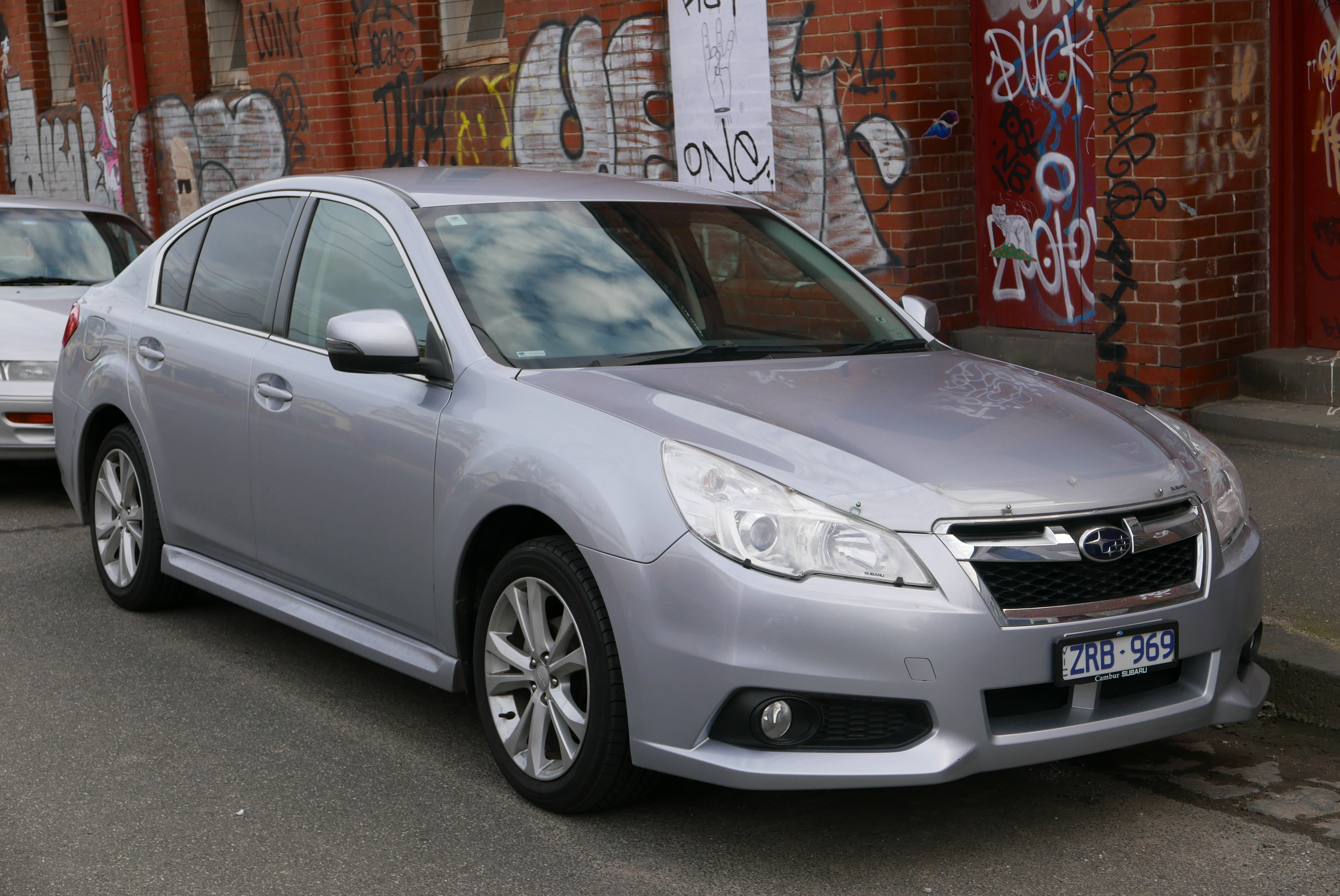
2013 Subaru Liberty (MY13) 2.5i

The dual-zone climate control system is standard on all trim levels. Sound systems offered include the McIntosh GPS/stereo unit with 10 speakers, a separate powered amplifier and satellite navigation provided by "WhereIs", a service provided by Telstra Corporation Ltd, or the Harman/Kardon stereo with the satellite navigation and six speakers or the unit offered in North America and Europe with a 6-disc in-dash CD changer and six speakers. The McIntosh unit sold in Australia features function buttons written in English and differs from the Japanese unit, as it does not use Japanese characters on some of its functions. The Australian McIntosh or Harman/Kardon GPS-stereo packages are not Gracenote, G-BOOK, and VICS enabled, and do not have the internal 600 MHz 40GB HDD coupled with a digital TV tuner. The center dashboard trim is color-matched based on the stereo installed. If either of the Harman/Kardon units is installed, the trim color is silver brushed aluminum. If the McIntosh unit is installed, the trim color is black brushed aluminum. The climate controls are also colored either silver or black. Silver trim is installed on the doors and dashboard of the 2.5i and 2.5i Premium models, while carbon fiber inserts are featured on the 2.5i Sports models and the 2.5GT. Woodgrain is available only on the 3.6R sedan. Cruise control, heated seats, automatic windshield wipers, HID headlights with headlight washers, heated exterior mirrors, and 17" wheels as standard equipment on the 2.5i, 2.5i Premium, 2.5i Premium SatNav, and 18" wheels on the 2.5i Sports, Sports Premium, Sports Premium SatNav, and the 2.5GT Premium SatNav. The smart key is available only on the 2.5GT or the 3.6R, and the glass moonroof is only offered on Premium trim packages.

== Specifications ==
=== Chassis types ===
code	BM	BR
body styles	sedan	wagon

=== Engines ===
Model	Years	Type (code)	Power, torque@rpm
North American engines
2.5i, PZEV (USA)	2009-2012	2,457 cc (2.5 L; 149.9 cu in) H4 (EJ25)	170 bhp (127 kW) @5600, 170 lb⋅ft (230 N⋅m) @4000
2.5i, PZEV (USA)	2012-	2,498 cc (2.5 L; 152.4 cu in) H4 (FB25)	173 bhp (129 kW) @5800, 174 lb⋅ft (236 N⋅m) @4100
2.5GT (USA)	2009-2012	2,457 cc (2.5 L; 149.9 cu in) H4 turbo (EJ25)	265 bhp (198 kW) @5600, 258 lb⋅ft (350 N⋅m) @2000-5200
3.6R (USA)	2009-	3,630 cc (3.6 L; 221.5 cu in) H6 (EZ36)	256 bhp (191 kW) @6000, 247 lb⋅ft (335 N⋅m) @4400
Japanese engines
2.0i (Japan)	2012-	1,998 cc (2.0 L; 121.9 cu in) H4 (FA20)	200 PS (147 kW; 197 hp) @7000, 205 N⋅m (151 lb⋅ft) @6600
2.0GT (Japan)	2012-	1,998 cc (2.0 L; 121.9 cu in) H4 (FA20) (turbo)	300 PS (221 kW; 296 hp) @5600, 400 N⋅m (295 lb⋅ft) @4800
2.5i (Japan)	2012-	2,498 cc (2.5 L; 152.4 cu in) H4 (FB25)	170 PS (125 kW; 168 hp) @5600, 229 N⋅m (169 lb⋅ft) @4000
2.5i (Japan)	2009-2012	2,457 cc (2.5 L; 149.9 cu in) H4 (EJ25)	170 PS (125 kW; 168 hp) @5600, 229 N⋅m (169 lb⋅ft) @4000
2.5GT (Japan)	2009-2012	2,457 cc (2.5 L; 149.9 cu in) H4 turbo (EJ25)	285 PS (210 kW; 281 hp) @6000, 350 N⋅m (258 lb⋅ft) @2000-5600
3.6R (Japan)	2009-	3,629 cc (3.6 L; 221.5 cu in) H6 (EZ36)	260 PS (191 kW; 256 hp) @6000, 335 N⋅m (247 lb⋅ft) @4400
United Kingdom engines
2.5i (UK)	2009-	2,457 cc (2.5 L; 149.9 cu in) H4 (EJ25)	167 PS (123 kW; 165 hp) @5600, 229 N⋅m (169 lb⋅ft) @4000
2.0D (UK)	2009-	1,998 cc (2.0 L; 121.9 cu in) H4 turbo (EE20)	150 PS (110 kW; 148 hp) @3600, 350 N⋅m (258 lb⋅ft) @1800-2400
European engines
2.5i (Europe)	2009-	2,457 cc (2.5 L; 149.9 cu in) H4 (EJ25)	167 PS (123 kW; 165 hp) @5600, 229 N⋅m (169 lb⋅ft) @4000
2.0D (Europe)	2009-	1,998 cc (2.0 L; 121.9 cu in) H4 turbo (EE20)	150 PS (110 kW; 148 hp) @3600, 350 N⋅m (258 lb⋅ft) @1800-2400
2.0i (Europe)	2009-	1,994 cc (2.0 L; 121.7 cu in) H4 (EJ20)	150 PS (110 kW; 148 hp) @6000, 196 N⋅m (145 lb⋅ft) @3000
Australian engines
2.5i (Australia)	2009-	2,457 cc (2.5 L; 149.9 cu in) H4 (EJ25)	170 bhp (127 kW) @5600, 170 lb⋅ft (230 N⋅m) @4000
2.5GT (Australia)	2009-	2,457 cc (2.5 L; 149.9 cu in) H4 turbo (EJ25)	265 bhp (198 kW) @5600, 258 lb⋅ft (350 N⋅m) @2000-5200
3.6R (Australia)	2009-	3,630 cc (3.6 L; 221.5 cu in) H6 (EZ36)	256 bhp (191 kW) @6000, 247 lb⋅ft (335 N⋅m) @4400

=== Transmissions ===
Model	Years	Type
Global engines
2.0i	2009-	6-speed manual, Lineartronic CVT
2.5i	2009-	Lineartronic CVT
2.5GT	2009-	6-speed manual
2.0D	2009-	6-speed manual
North American, Japan engines
2.5i	2009-	6-speed manual, Lineartronic CVT
2.5GT	2009-	6-speed manual, 5-speed SportShift automatic
3.6R	2009-	5-speed automatic

Models with Lineartronic Continuously variable transmission include steering column-mounted paddle shifters that allow the driver to select 6 "virtual gears" in manual mode.

=== Safety ===
ANCAP test results* Subaru Liberty / Legacy Exiga (2009)
Test	Score
Overall	5 /5 stars
Frontal offset	13.31/16
Side impact	16/16
Pole	2/2
Seat belt reminders	2/3
Whiplash protection	Not Assessed
Pedestrian protection	Adequate
Electronic stability control	Standard

ANCAP test results* Subaru Liberty / Legacy variant(s) as tested (2010)
Test	Score
Overall	5 /5 stars
Frontal offset	13.80/16
Side impact	16/16
Pole	2/2
Seat belt reminders	3/3
Whiplash protection	Not Assessed
Pedestrian protection	Adequate
Electronic stability control	Standard
