= Teshan =

Teshan may refer to:

- Teshan (monk) (780-865), Chinese zen monk
- Teshan (film), 2016 Indian Punjabi-language romantic comedy film

== See also ==
- Tashan (disambiguation)
