= Mediocre =

Mediocre or mediocrity may refer to:

- Mediocre (album), a 2008 album by Ximena Sariñana
- "Mediocre" (composition), a 1955 jazz composition by Bud Powell
- Mediocrity (advertising campaign), a 2011 Subaru advertising campaign

== See also ==
- Mediocracy, a 2006 book by Fabian Tassano
