= Bidu, Jam =

Bidu بيدو
- Village
- Location within Iran
- Coordinates: 27°58′39″N 52°16′19″E
- Country: Iran
- Province: Bushehr
- County: Jam
- Bakhsh: Riz
- Rural District: Tashan

Population (2006)
  - Total: 173
- Time zone: UTC+3:30 (IRST)
  - Summer (DST): UTC+4:30 (IRDT)

Bidu (Persian: بيدو, also Romanized as Bīdū; also known as Bīdū Sarḩad) is a village in Tashan Rural District, Riz District, Jam County, Bushehr Province, Iran. At the 2006 census, its population was 173, in 39 families.
