= Darreh Ban =

Village in Bushehr province, Iran

Darreh Ban Persian: دره بان
- Village
- Location within Iran
- Coordinates: 28°01′49″N 52°07′06″E
- Country: Iran
- Province: Bushehr
- County: Jam
- District: Riz
- Rural District: Tashan

Population (2016)
  - Total: 1,012
- Time zone: UTC+3:30 (IRST)

Darreh Ban (Persian: دره بان) (Note: Also romanized as Darreh Bān; also known as Darbān and Darvan) is a village in Tashan Rural District of Riz District in Jam County, Bushehr province, Iran.

== Demographics ==
=== Population ===
At the time of the 2006 National Census, the village's population was 783 in 167 households. The following census in 2011 counted 873 people in 222 households. The 2016 census measured the population of the village as 1,012 people in 270 households.
