= Tang-e Faryab =

Village in Bushehr province, Iran

Tang-e Faryab Persian: تنگ فارياب
- Village
- Location within Iran
- Coordinates: 29°13′57″N 51°27′25″E
- Country: Iran
- Province: Bushehr
- County: Dashtestan
- District: Eram
- Rural District: Eram

Population (2016)
  - Total: 266
- Time zone: UTC+3:30 (IRST)

Tang-e Faryab (Persian: تنگ فارياب) (Note: Also romanized as Tang-e Fāreyāb, Tang-e Fariab and Tang-e Fārīāb) is a village in Eram Rural District of Eram District in Dashtestan County, Bushehr province, Iran.

== Demographics ==
=== Population ===
At the time of the 2006 National Census, the village's population was 332 in 68 households. The following census in 2011 counted 238 people in 62 households. The 2016 census measured the population of the village as 266 people in 74 households.
