= Suk, Iran =

Village in Bushehr province, Iran

Suk Persian: سوك
- Village
- Location within Iran
- Coordinates: 29°05′55″N 51°28′28″E
- Country: Iran
- Province: Bushehr
- County: Dashtestan
- District: Eram
- Rural District: Dehrud

Population (2016)
  - Total: 32
- Time zone: UTC+3:30 (IRST)

Suk (Persian: سوك) (Note: Also romanized as Sūḵ; also known as Samūk) is a village in Dehrud Rural District of Eram District in Dashtestan County, Bushehr province, Iran.

== Demographics ==
=== Population ===
At the time of the 2006 National Census, the village's population was 74 in 17 households. The following census in 2011 counted 48 people in 12 households. The 2016 census measured the population of the village as 32 people in nine households.
