= Tang-e Eram =

City in Bushehr province, Iran

Tang-e Eram Persian: تنگ ارم
- City
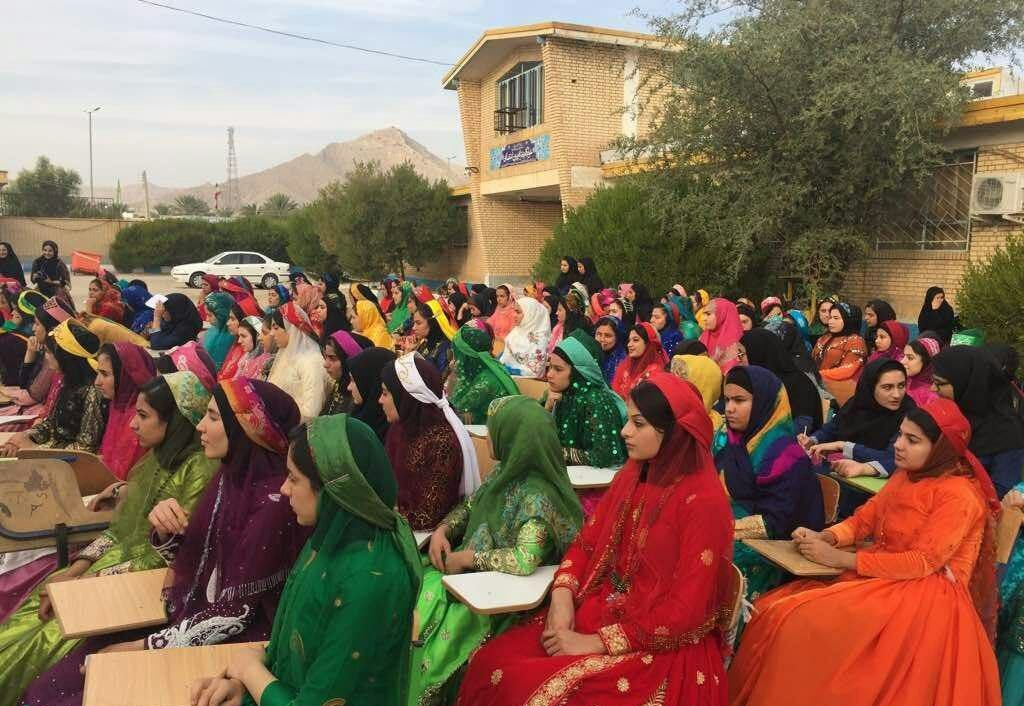
- Students of Tang-e Eram Dashtestan Boarding High School came to school wearing Southern Lori clothing

- Location within Iran
- Coordinates: 29°09′11″N 51°31′45″E
- Country: Iran
- Province: Bushehr
- County: Dashtestan
- District: Eram
- Established as a city: 2004

Population (2016)
  - Total: 3,242
- Time zone: UTC+3:30 (IRST)

Tang-e Eram (Persian: تنگ ارم) (Note: Also romanized as Tang Eram, Tang-e-Rām, and Tang-i-Ram) is a city in, and the capital of, Eram District in Dashtestan County, Bushehr province, Iran. It also serves as the administrative center for Eram Rural District. The village of Tang-e Eram was converted to a city in 2004.

== Demographics ==
=== Population ===
At the time of the 2006 National Census, the city's population was 2,928 in 637 households. The following census in 2011 counted 3,183 people in 731 households. The 2016 census measured the population of the city as 3,242 people in 875 households.

== See also ==
Media related to Tang-e Eram at Wikimedia Commons
