= Suck Creek =

Suck Creek may refer to:

- Suck Creek, Tennessee, an unincorporated community in Marion County
- Suck Creek, West Virginia, an unincorporated community in Summers County
