= Sux =

Sux or SUX may refer to:

- Sioux Gateway Airport, IATA and FAA code
- Sumerian language, ISO 639-3 code
- Suxamethonium chloride, a paralytic medication

== See also ==
- Suck (disambiguation)
