= Rud-e Faryab =

Village in Bushehr province, Iran

Rud-e Faryab Persian: رودفارياب
- Village
- Location within Iran
- Coordinates: 29°15′13″N 51°28′44″E
- Country: Iran
- Province: Bushehr
- County: Dashtestan
- District: Eram
- Rural District: Eram

Population (2016)
  - Total: 1,917
- Time zone: UTC+3:30 (IRST)

Rud-e Faryab (Persian: رودفارياب) (Note: Also romanized as Rūd Fāryāb and Rūd-e Fāryāb; also known as Fārīāb, Pāreyow, Rūh Fārīāb, and Rūḩ Fāryāb) is a village in Eram Rural District of Eram District in Dashtestan County, Bushehr province, Iran.

== Demographics ==
=== Population ===
At the time of the 2006 National Census, the village's population was 1,695 in 363 households. The following census in 2011 counted 1,860 people in 455 households. The 2016 census measured the population of the village as 1,917 people in 539 households. It was the most populous village in its rural district.
