= Aqa Mir Ahmad =

Village in Bushehr province, Iran

Aqa Mir Ahmad Persian: اقاميراحمد
- Village
- Location within Iran
- Country: Iran
- Province: Bushehr
- County: Dashtestan
- District: Eram
- Rural District: Dehrud

Population (2016)
  - Total: 93
- Time zone: UTC+3:30 (IRST)

Aqa Mir Ahmad (Persian: اقاميراحمد) (Note: Also romanized as Āqā Mīr Aḩmad) is a village in Dehrud Rural District of Eram District in Dashtestan County, Bushehr province, Iran.

== Demographics ==
=== Population ===
At the time of the 2006 National Census, the village's population was 142 in 26 households. The following census in 2011 counted 54 people in 14 households. The 2016 census measured the population of the village as 93 people in 26 households.
