= Foreign Policy Institute (Turkey) =

Turkish think tank on foreign policy and international relations

- Founder: Seyfi Tashan
- Established: 1974; 52 years ago
- President: Hüseyin Diriöz
- Location: Ankara, Turkey
- Website: https://foreignpolicy.org.tr/

The Foreign Policy Institute (Turkish: Dış Politika Enstitüsü or DPE) is a Turkish think tank on foreign policy and international relations. It was founded in 1974. The Foreign Policy Institute is the first ever think tank formed in Turkey. The founder and the first president is Seyfi Taşhan. The incumbent president is Hüseyin Diriöz.

== Background and history ==
The Turkish Foreign Policy Institute (FPI) was founded in 1974 as a private organization. Its Council of Administration is composed of academicians, diplomats and bureaucrats. The founder of the Institute, Seyfi Taşhan, is also the President. The Turkish Foreign Policy Institute aims at contributing to foreign policy through research, meetings and publications. Researchers come mostly from the Turkish universities. International conferences, seminars and workshops are organized mainly in cooperation with foreign counterparts. The FPI and its director are currently members of a number of international research and study centers.

It is currently affiliated to the Turkish Foundation for International Relations and Strategic Studies. The FPI became affiliated with the Turkish Foundation for Strategy and International Relations when it was established in 1987, and was a founder of East-West Security Studies Institute, the Mediterranean Study Commission and also of EuroMeSCo. It publishes a quarterly, Foreign Policy (Turkish: Dış Politika), first published in 1971, OCLC 5289597 It has another publication called Turkey's Neighbours.

Between 1991 and 2000, the organisation was hosted by Hacettepe University, and since then it has been associated with Bilkent University. The Institute administers an award program of İhsan Doğramacı Prize of International Relations for Peace.
