= Hüseyin Diriöz =

Turkish ambassador (b. 1956)

Assistant Secretary General of NATO
- In office 2010–2013

Personal details
- Born: Hüseyin Diriöz; 17 September 1956 (age 69) Istanbul, Turkey
- Education: Mekteb-i Mülkiye; University of Virginia; NATO Defense College

Hüseyin Diriöz (born 17 September 1956) is a retired Turkish ambassador, most notably serving as ambassador to Moscow and as former assistant secretary-general of NATO for Defence Policy and Planning. Ambassador Diriöz is currently the president of the Foreign Policy Institute.

He was a former ambassador of Turkey to Moscow, Russia (2016–2019), Brasília, Brazil (2013–2016) and Amman, Jordan (2004–2008). Prior to becoming ambassador, he served in the United States, France, and Afghanistan.

He held senior positions at the Ministry of Foreign Affairs including director-general of the Middle East Directorate, chief advisor to the President of Turkey, and spokesperson.

In 2024 Ambassador Diriöz was appointed as President of the Foreign Policy Institute.

== Education ==
Ambassador Diriöz is a graduate of Ankara University, where he studied political sciences, and the University of Virginia, where he gained his M.A.

== Career ==
Ambassador Diriöz is a career diplomat who served his country for 30 years. He first joined the Turkish Ministry of Foreign Affairs in 1978 and served in Kabul and Strasbourg before attending the NATO Defence College in Rome in 1987/88. He then returned to the Ministry of Foreign Affairs for a further year before joining the Turkish Delegation to NATO for four years.

In 1993, ambassador Diriöz joined the NATO International Staff as head of the Defence Policy Section and in 1996 he returned to the Ministry of Foreign Affairs in Ankara. From 1998 to 2000 he was minister-counsellor in the Turkish Embassy, Washington D.C., and on his return he became the Spokesman for the Ministry of Foreign Affairs. From 2004 to 2008, he was Turkey's Ambassador to Jordan after which he returned to the Ministry in Ankara for a year before becoming the Chief Foreign Policy Advisor to the President of Turkey Abdullah Gül.

In 2010, he was appointed as Assistant Secretary General of NATO for Defence Policy and Planning. After his tenure at NATO, he served as Turkish Ambassador to Brasilia. Subsequently, he was appointed as Turkish Ambassador to Moscow in 2016 until 2019.

In 2024 he became President of the Foreign Policy Institute.

== North Atlantic Treaty Organization ==
Hüseyin Diriöz served at the NATO International Staff as assistant secretary-general from October 2010 for a duration of three years. The Defence Policy and Planning Division, which he directed and managed, has the lead on defence related issues such as defence transformation, defence capabilities, defence planning, logistics, missile defence and nuclear policy.

The Division is responsible for developing political guidance for the implementation of NATO's new Strategic Concept, in particular to guide the work undertaken during the NATO Defence Planning Process, and is also responsible for the defence related aspects of cooperation between NATO and the European Union, notably in the field of defence planning and capability development. In addition, the Division is responsible for the political-military and defence related aspects of cooperation with partners and International Organisations.
