= Lardeh, Bushehr =

Village in Bushehr province, Iran

Lardeh Persian: لرده
- Village
- Location within Iran
- Country: Iran
- Province: Bushehr
- County: Dashtestan
- District: Eram
- Rural District: Eram

Population (2016)
  - Total: 27
- Time zone: UTC+3:30 (IRST)

Lardeh (Persian: لرده) is a village in Eram Rural District of Eram District in Dashtestan County, Bushehr province, Iran.

== Demographics ==
=== Population ===
At the time of the 2006 National Census, the village's population was 46 in nine households. The following census in 2011 counted a population below the reporting threshold. The 2016 census measured the population of the village as 27 people in eight households.
