= Seyfi Tashan =

Turkish political analyst and historian

Seyfi Taşhan

Founder and Director of the Foreign Policy Institute

Personal details
- Born: 1925 (age 100–101) Ankara, Turkey
- Spouse: Aymelek Tashan
- Education: Ankara University

Seyfi Taşhan (born in 1925) is a Turkish political analyst, thought leader, and historian. He is the founder and the Director of Foreign Policy Institute, Turkey's first political think-tank. On April 9, 2015, speaking at an honorary ceremony in honor of Taşhan, Turkish Foreign Minister Mevlüt Çavuşoğlu referred to Taşhan as "a guru in Turkish diplomacy, serving more than 40 years as the president of the Foreign Policy Institute and being a guiding light to the ministry as well."

Taşhan's impact on Turkey's outlook from the international perspective played an important role, especially in the Council of Europe.

== Early life ==
Taşhan was born in Ankara in 1925. He received his education at Ankara University, Faculty of Letters, graduating in 1947.

== Career ==
In 1945, he entered government service at the State Organization for Press, Radio, Information and Tourism where he served until 1955 as an international affairs analyst. In 1950 he founded the Foreign Broadcast Services of Turkish Radio and Television Corporation and from 1953 to 1955 he served as assistant to the Director in charge of information activities.

He received experience and training in France (1951) and the United States (1953). In 1954, he accompanied President Celâl Bayar during his visit to the US as information assistant and interpreter.

In 1971, he started publishing the Foreign Policy Review as a quarterly journal of international affairs. In 1974, he founded the Foreign Policy Institute with several academics that he still directs. In this capacity he attended international conferences, organized many national and international seminars and published extensively in Turkish Foreign Policy and international affairs. He lectured in many countries on Turkey and Turkish Foreign Policy.

Taşhan is a member of Turkish associations and foundations including Kocatepe Rotary Club, Turkish Foundation for International Relations and Strategic Studies, Cyprus Foundation, and abroad member of IISS (London), member of the Board of Advisors Center for European Policy Studies (Brussels), member of the Middle East Advisory Board of Center Security and International Studies (Washington D.C.), member of the academic board of Association for 2000 (The Hague), alumni member of East-West Institute (New York), member of Mediterranean Study Commission (Rome) and member of Le Cercle (London). As the Director of Foreign Policy Institute, Taşhan attended international meetings including the Bilderberg Group.

== Recognition ==
In 1989, he received the distinguished service citation by the Minister of Foreign Affairs.

In 2014, he was given pro-Merit for his previous services in Council of Europe.

In 2015, he was given an award by the Ministry of Foreign Affairs for his continued services. That year he was awarded by Middle East Technical University in Ankara for his contribution to international studies.

In 2016, the Council for International Studies of several universities of İstanbul and İzmir awarded him as the founder of the Foreign Policy Institute.

== Personal life ==
Seyfi Taşhan is the father of Turkish Ambassador to Slovenia Aylin Taşhan, and the uncle of businesswoman Pembe Candaner.
