= Dehrud-e Sofla =

Village in Bushehr province, Iran

Dehrud-e Sofla Persian: دهرود سفلي
- Village
- Location within Iran
- Coordinates: 28°59′58″N 51°39′14″E
- Country: Iran
- Province: Bushehr
- County: Dashtestan
- District: Eram
- Rural District: Dehrud

Population (2016)
  - Total: 2,218
- Time zone: UTC+3:30 (IRST)

Dehrud-e Sofla (Persian: دهرود سفلي) (Note: Also romanized as Dehrood Sofla and Dehrūd-e Soflá; also known as Dehrūd-e Pā’īn) is a village in, and the capital of, Dehrud Rural District in Eram District of Dashtestan County, Bushehr province, Iran.

== Demographics ==
=== Population ===
At the time of the 2006 National Census, the village's population was 1,666 in 343 households. The following census in 2011 counted 2,000 people in 574 households. The 2016 census measured the population of the village as 2,218 people in 602 households. It was the most populous village in its rural district.
