= Dehrud-e Olya =

Village in Bushehr province, Iran

Dehrud-e Olya Persian: دهرودعليا
- Village
- Location within Iran
- Coordinates: 29°01′49″N 51°37′52″E
- Country: Iran
- Province: Bushehr
- County: Dashtestan
- District: Eram
- Rural District: Dehrud

Population (2016)
  - Total: 992
- Time zone: UTC+3:30 (IRST)

Dehrud-e Olya (Persian: دهرودعليا) (Note: Also romanized as Dehrood Olya and Dehrūd-e ‘Olyā; also known as Dehrūd-e Bālā) is a village in Dehrud Rural District of Eram District in Dashtestan County, Bushehr province, Iran.

== Demographics ==
=== Population ===
At the time of the 2006 National Census, the village's population was 1,082 in 207 households. The following census in 2011 counted 915 people in 228 households. The 2016 census measured the population of the village as 992 people in 265 households.
