= Lardeh, Rudsar =

Lardeh لرده
- Village
- Location within Iran
- Coordinates: 36°48′12″N 50°14′04″E
- Country: Iran
- Province: Gilan
- County: Rudsar
- Bakhsh: Rahimabad
- Rural District: Shuil

Population (2016)
  - Total: 75
- Time zone: UTC+3:30 (IRST)

Lardeh (Persian: لرده) is a village in Shuil Rural District, Rahimabad District, Rudsar County, Gilan Province, Iran.

At the time of the 2006 National Census, the village's population was 59 in 17 households. The following census in 2011 counted 42 people in 19 households. The 2016 census measured the population of the village as 75 people in 26 households.
