= Suck Creek, West Virginia =

- Unincorporated community
- Location within West Virginia Location within the United States
- Coordinates: 37°36′28″N 80°59′13″W
- Country: United States
- State: West Virginia
- County: Summers
- Elevation: 1,578 ft (481 m)
- Time zone: UTC-5 (Eastern (EST))
  - Summer (DST): UTC-4 (EDT)
- Area codes: 304 & 681
- GNIS feature ID: 1549943

Suck Creek is an unincorporated community in Summers County, West Virginia, United States, located southwest of Hinton.
