= Bidu, Anarestan =

Bidu بيدو
- Village
- Location within Iran
- Coordinates: 28°02′48″N 52°00′00″E
- Country: Iran
- Province: Bushehr
- County: Jam
- Bakhsh: Riz
- Rural District: Anarestan

Population (2006)
  - Total: 45
- Time zone: UTC+3:30 (IRST)
  - Summer (DST): UTC+4:30 (IRDT)

Bidu (Persian: بيدو, also Romanized as Bīdū; also known as Bidu Mūrdī, Bāgh-e Bīdū, Bāgh-e Dīdū, and Bāgh-i-Bīdu) is a village in Anarestan Rural District, Riz District, Jam County, Bushehr Province, Iran. At the 2006 census, its population was 45, in 7 families.
