= Faryab, Bastak =

Faryab فارياب
- Village
- Location within Iran
- Coordinates: 27°08′33″N 54°12′28″E
- Country: Iran
- Province: Hormozgan
- County: Bastak
- Bakhsh: Kukherd
- Rural District: Harang

Population (2006)
  - Total: 965
- Time zone: UTC+3:30 (IRST)
  - Summer (DST): UTC+4:30 (IRDT)

Faryab (Persian: فارياب, also Romanized as Fāryāb and Fariāb; also known as Fāryāb-e Kūhej and Fāryāb-e Kūhīj) is a village in Harang Rural District, Kukherd District, Bastak County, Hormozgan Province, Iran. At the 2006 census, its population was 965, in 195 families.
