= Tashan, Bushehr =

Village in Bushehr province, Iran

Tashan Persian: تشان
- Village
- Location within Iran
- Coordinates: 28°02′24″N 52°07′14″E
- Country: Iran
- Province: Bushehr
- County: Jam
- District: Riz
- Rural District: Tashan

Population (2016)
  - Total: 1,234
- Time zone: UTC+3:30 (IRST)

Tashan (Persian: تشان) (Note: Also romanized as Tashān; also known as Tashshān) is a village in, and the capital of, Tashan Rural District in Riz District of Jam County, Bushehr province, Iran.

== Demographics ==
=== Population ===
At the time of the 2006 National Census, the village's population was 1,099 in 241 households. The following census in 2011 counted 1,318 people in 302 households. The 2016 census measured the population of the village as 1,234 people in 338 households. It was the most populous village in its rural district.
