= Darbiduiyeh =

Village in Kerman, Iran

Darbiduiyeh دربيدوييه
- Village
- Location within Iran
- Coordinates: 30°29′14″N 55°05′32″E
- Country: Iran
- Province: Kerman
- County: Shahr-e Babak
- Bakhsh: Dehaj
- Rural District: Jowzam

Population (2006)
  - Total: 148
- Time zone: UTC+3:30 (IRST)
  - Summer (DST): UTC+4:30 (IRDT)

Darbiduiyeh (Persian: دربيدوييه, also Romanized as Darbīdū’īyeh; also known as Bīdu and Bīdū’īyeh) is a village in Jowzam Rural District, Dehaj District, Shahr-e Babak County, Kerman province, Iran. At the 2006 census, its population was 148, in 36 families.
