= Mount Ta =

Mountain in Yantai, Shandong Province, China

Coordinates: 37°30′38″N 121°24′03″E

Mount Ta (Chinese: 塔山; pinyin: Tǎshān) is a scenic site in Zhifu District, Yantai, in Shandong province, People's Republic of China. It has a temple dedicated to the boddhisatva Kuan Yin as well as a Taoist pagoda dedicated to the Three Pure Ones.
