= Pembe Candaner =

Turkish businesswoman (born 1957)

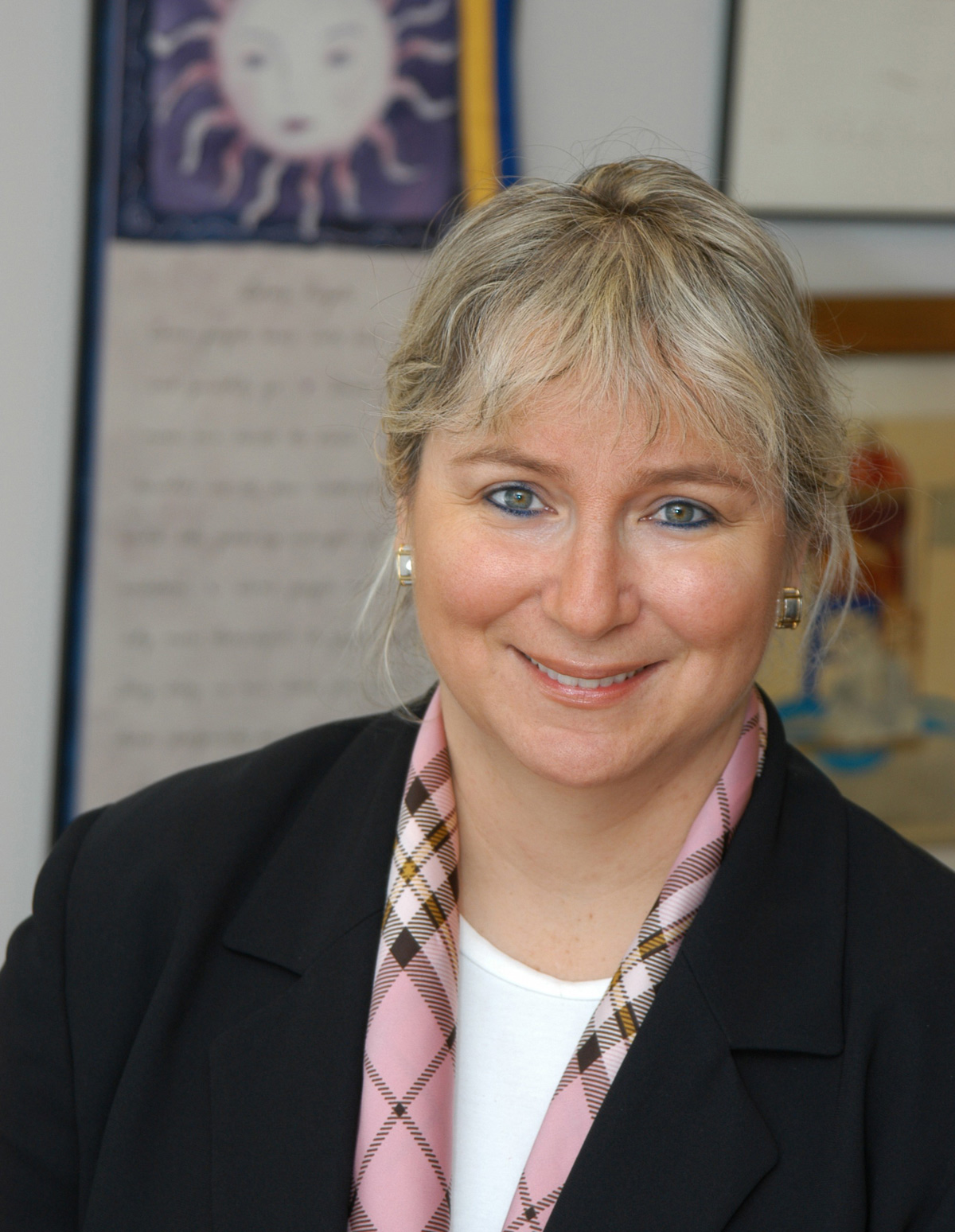
- Born: June 23, 1957 (age 69); Ankara, Turkey
- Education: Middle East Technical University; Ankara University; Mimar Sinan University

Pembe Candaner (born Pembe Taşhan on June 23, 1957) is a Turkish businesswoman, human resources expert and consultant, author, speaker, columnist and host of her TV show. Candaner served as the CEO of major corporations such as Adecco SA Turkey and Kariyer.net. She is a member of TUSIAD (Turkish Industry and Business Association), the top business association of Turkey and Society for Human Resource Management. Additionally to her career in private sector, she authored 4 books, held a column in daily Sabah and currently has a column in CEO Life Magazine. She is a member of Board of Advisors of Forbes Magazine in Turkey and hosted her TV show at ‘Artı Bir TV’ about Woman Leaders and Entrepreneurs. Candaner was awarded as the Business Woman of the year 2003, by the Dunya Newspaper.

== Career ==
In 1997, Candaner was appointed Country Manager (Turkey) of Adecco SA. Later she became the CEO of Adecco Turkey, GM of Lee Hecht Harrisson and had a chair in the Board of Directors and remained in this position for nine years. In 2003, Candaner played a central role in changing the Labor Law and the legalization of Private Employment Agencies. The law also legalized temporary work, work-on-call and part-time work, which was previously not legal in Turkey. In 2005, she was selected as a consultant by European Union for the standardization of Public Employment Agency (İşkur) and for the National Employment Strategies of Turkey. In 2009, she founded the ‘Yaratıcı İnsan Platformu' (Creative Human Platform) to help the entrepreneurs in Turkey and support the creative ideas and entrepreneurship. In 2011, she also became the shareholder of Mikom Inc. and holds the position of Vice President in Board of Directors. Since 2003, Candaner is the Founding and Honorary President of Private Employment Agencies Association (Özel İstihdam Burolari Dernegi). She is also a member of TUSIAD (Turkish Industry and Business Association), the top business association of Turkey.

In 2016, she co-founded JobzMall, a job finding platform focused primarily on youth employment, located in Orange County, California. She currently serves as its President.

== Bibliography ==
- Devenin kirpiği ne zaman işe yarar? Epsilon Yayınevi, 2006
- Sıradışı Kariyer için yaratıcı öyküler, Epsilon Yayınevi, 2007
- Bu yerin kulağı var, İş Bankası Kültür Yayınları,2011
- Türk Sanayiinde Bir Uzun Yol Kaptanı - Hasan Subaşı Kitabı, İş Bankası Kültür Yayınları,2015
