= Deh Rud, Kerman =

Deh Rud ده رود
- Village
- Location within Iran
- Coordinates: 28°51′42″N 57°44′09″E
- Country: Iran
- Province: Kerman
- County: Anbarabad
- Bakhsh: Central
- Rural District: Amjaz

Population (2006)
  - Total: 618
- Time zone: UTC+3:30 (IRST)
  - Summer (DST): UTC+4:30 (IRDT)

Deh Rud (Persian: ده رود, also Romanized as Deh Rūd) is a village in Amjaz Rural District, in the Central District of Anbarabad County, Kerman Province, Iran. At the 2006 census, its population was 618, in 105 families.
