= Fariab-e Kalamak =

Fariab-e Kalamak فارياب كلمك
- Village
- Location within Iran
- Coordinates: 31°00′23″N 50°40′59″E
- Country: Iran
- Province: Kohgiluyeh and Boyer-Ahmad
- County: Boyer-Ahmad
- Bakhsh: Ludab
- Rural District: Chin

Population (2006)
  - Total: 24
- Time zone: UTC+3:30 (IRST)
  - Summer (DST): UTC+4:30 (IRDT)

Fariab-e Kalamak (Persian: فارياب كلمك, also Romanized as Fārīāb-e Kalamak; also known as Fārīāb) is a village in Chin Rural District, Ludab District, Boyer-Ahmad County, Kohgiluyeh and Boyer-Ahmad Province, Iran. At the 2006 census, its population was 24, in 4 families.
