= Fariab, Rostam =

Fariab فارياب
- Village
- Location within Iran
- Coordinates: 30°28′18″N 51°19′41″E
- Country: Iran
- Province: Fars
- County: Rostam
- Bakhsh: Sorna
- Rural District: Poshtkuh-e Rostam

Population (2006)
  - Total: 137
- Time zone: UTC+3:30 (IRST)
  - Summer (DST): UTC+4:30 (IRDT)

Fariab (Persian: فارياب, also Romanized as Fārīāb, Fāreyāb, and Faryāb; also known as Perīyū) is a village in Poshtkuh-e Rostam Rural District, Sorna District, Rostam County, Fars province, Iran. At the 2006 census, its population was 137, in 25 families.
