= Dehrud Rural District =

Rural district in Bushehr province, Iran

Dehrud Rural District Persian: دهستان دهرود
- Rural District
- Location within Iran
- Coordinates: 29°03′N 51°38′E
- Country: Iran
- Province: Bushehr
- County: Dashtestan
- District: Eram
- Established: 2001
- Capital: Dehrud-e Sofla

Population (2016)
  - Total: 5,372
- Time zone: UTC+3:30 (IRST)

Dehrud Rural District (Persian: دهستان دهرود) is in Eram District of Dashtestan County, Bushehr province, Iran. Its capital is the village of Dehrud-e Sofla.

== Demographics ==
=== Population ===
At the time of the 2006 National Census, the rural district's population was 5,507 in 1,097 households. There were 5,072 inhabitants in 1,242 households at the following census of 2011. The 2016 census measured the population of the rural district as 5,372 in 1,459 households. The most populous of its 16 villages was Dehrud-e Sofla, with 2,218 people.

=== Other villages in the rural district ===
- Aqa Mir Ahmad
- Chavak
- Dehrud-e Olya
- Kaftaru
- Kam Zard
- Mordeh Kheyr
- Nasad
- Porganak
- Runi
- Suk
