= Faryab-e Isin =

Faryab فارياب
- Village
- Location within Iran
- Coordinates: 27°28′09″N 57°04′56″E
- Country: Iran
- Province: Hormozgan
- County: Bandar Abbas
- Bakhsh: Central
- Rural District: Isin

Population (2006)
  - Total: 1,155
- Time zone: UTC+3:30 (IRST)
  - Summer (DST): UTC+4:30 (IRDT)

Faryab (Persian: فارياب, also Romanized as Fāryāb; also known as Farīāb, Fāryāb, and Parīāb) is a village located in Roudan Rural District, in the Central District of Bandar Abbas County, Hormozgan Province, Iran. At the 2006 census, its population was 1,155, in 268 families.
