= Paraf-e Pain =

Paraf-e Pain پاراف پايين
- Village
- Country: Iran
- Province: Hormozgan
- County: Minab
- Bakhsh: Byaban
- Rural District: Byaban

Population (2006)
  - Total: 145
- Time zone: UTC+3:30 (IRST)
  - Summer (DST): UTC+4:30 (IRDT)

Paraf-e Pain (Persian: پاراف پايين, also Romanized as Pārāf-e Pā’īn) is a village in Byaban Rural District, Byaban District, Minab County, Hormozgan Province, Iran. At the 2006 census, its population was 145, in 26 families.
