= Eram Rural District =

Rural district in Bushehr province, Iran

Eram Rural District Persian: دهستان ارم
- Rural District
- Location within Iran
- Coordinates: 29°17′N 51°33′E
- Country: Iran
- Province: Bushehr
- County: Dashtestan
- District: Eram
- Established: 1987
- Capital: Tang-e Eram

Population (2016)
  - Total: 5,045
- Time zone: UTC+3:30 (IRST)

Eram Rural District (Persian: دهستان ارم) is in Eram District of Dashtestan County, Bushehr province, Iran. It is administered from the city of Tang-e Eram.

== Demographics ==
At the time of the 2006 National Census, the rural district's population was 6,116 in 1,217 households. There were 5,120 inhabitants in 1,245 households at the following census of 2011. The 2016 census measured the population of the rural district as 5,045 in 1,394 households. The most populous of its 22 villages was Rud-e Faryab, with 1,917 people.

=== Other villages in the rural district ===
- Ab Garmu
- Anarestan
- Bagh-e Taj
- Bozpar
- Charab
- Jamghari
- Jamileh
- Kheyrak
- Lardeh
- Nakhah
- Sanavin Sana
- Shekarak
- Talkh Ab
- Tang-e Darkash
- Tang-e Faryab
- Tang-e Suk
