= Faryab-e Sanguyeh =

Faryab-e Sanguyeh فارياب سنگويه
- Village
- Location within Iran
- Coordinates: 27°24′58″N 54°16′20″E
- Country: Iran
- Province: Hormozgan
- County: Bastak
- Bakhsh: Central
- Rural District: Fatuyeh

Population (2006)
  - Total: 609
- Time zone: UTC+3:30 (IRST)
  - Summer (DST): UTC+4:30 (IRDT)

Faryab-e Sanguyeh (Persian: فارياب سنگويه, also Romanized as Fāryāb-e Sangūyeh; also known as Fāryāb-e Sangū and Fāryāb-e-Sengu) is a village located in Fatuyeh Rural District, in the Central District of Bastak County, Hormozgan Province, Iran. At the 2006 census, its population was 609, in 108 families.
