= Taşhan, Mut =

Caravanserai in Mersin, Turkey

Taşhan Producer Women’s Market
- Interactive map of the Taşhan; Producer Women’s Market area

General information
- Type: Caravanserai
- Architectural style: Ottoman architecture
- Location: Mut, Turkey, Doğancı mah. Mut, Mersin
- Coordinates: 36°38′38″N 33°26′09″E.
- Construction started: 1723
- Completed: 1725
- Renovated: 2020
- Owner: Arslan family

Design and construction
- Main contractor: Hacı Sunullah Pasha

Taşhan is a historical caravanserai in Mersin Province, Turkey.

It is situated in Mut ilçe (district) of Mersin Province to the south of Mut Castle at 36°38′38″N 33°26′09″E. The caravanserai was constructed in 1723-1725 by an Ottoman mutasarrıf (governor) named Hacı Sunullah Pasha. It is a rectangular-plan caravanserai. After the period of caravans the caravanserai was used as a local bazaar. But for the last 30 years, it was out of commission. In 2020 Mersin Metropolitan Municipality and Arslan family (the owner of building) decided to open the bazaar as a Producer Women’s market. The opening ceremony was held on 26 September 2020. Mersin metropolitan mayor Vahap Seçer as well as Mut mayor Volkan Şeker and the owner of the building were present in the ceremony. The honoured quest was folk musician Musa Eroğlu.
