= Mir Ahmad, Khuzestan =

Mir Ahmad ميراحمد
- Village
- Location within Iran
- Coordinates: 31°36′38″N 50°15′02″E
- Country: Iran
- Province: Khuzestan
- County: Izeh
- Bakhsh: Dehdez
- Rural District: Donbaleh Rud-e Jonubi

Population (2006)
  - Total: 703
- Time zone: UTC+3:30 (IRST)
  - Summer (DST): UTC+4:30 (IRDT)

Mir Ahmad (Persian: ميراحمد, also Romanized as Mīr Ahmad and Mīr Aḩmad; also known as Mīr Aḩmadī) is a village in Donbaleh Rud-e Jonubi Rural District, Dehdez District, Izeh County, Khuzestan Province, Iran. At the 2006 census, its population was 703, in 138 families.
