= Suck Run =

River in Ohio

Coordinates: 38°46′10″N 83°42′55″W

Suck Run is a stream in the U.S. state of Ohio. It is a tributary of Eagle Creek.

== See also ==
- List of rivers of Ohio
