= Tashan Rural District =

Rural district in Bushehr province, Iran

Tashan Rural District Persian: دهستان تشان
- Rural District
- Location within Iran
- Coordinates: 28°01′N 52°15′E
- Country: Iran
- Province: Bushehr
- County: Jam
- District: Riz
- Established: 2003
- Capital: Tashan

Population (2016)
  - Total: 4,031
- Time zone: UTC+3:30 (IRST)

Tashan Rural District (Persian: دهستان تشان) is in Riz District of Jam County, Bushehr province, Iran. Its capital is the village of Tashan.

== Demographics ==
=== Population ===
At the time of the 2006 National Census, the rural district's population was 3,349 in 727 households. There were 3,700 inhabitants in 906 households at the following census of 2011. The 2016 census measured the population of the rural district as 4,031 in 1,125 households. The most populous of its 13 villages was Tashan, with 1,234 people.

=== Other villages in the rural district ===
- Darreh Ban
- Gandomzar
- Tang-e Man
