= Mediocrity (advertising campaign) =

The 2011 Mediocrity is an advertising campaign launched by Subaru of America to represent the blandness of mid-sized sedans. The ad campaign presents a fictitious vehicle that satirizes the American mid-sized sedan market. Without attacking specific automobile manufacturers, Subaru of America created the Mediocrity, a fictional sedan that exemplifies all of the typical features found on mid-sized sedans in 2010.

== Campaign ==
The 2011 Mediocrity launch was designed to promote the Subaru Legacy. The campaign started with a digital postcard sent out to key industry insiders, which drove them to a website and informed them of the launch date. A Facebook page was created right before launch to help spark conversations about the car. Some cryptic Tweets also went out pre-launch to help generate awareness of an approaching “big event”.

On October 1, 2010, the official website, 2011Mediocrity.com, went live. Three days later, a television campaign directed by Baker Smith of Harvest Films was launched with a series of television advertisements and rich media. Banners and 15- and 30-second video “pre-rolls” were deployed, with all communications directing consumers to the Mediocrity website. Finally, car shopping sites offered "Expert Reviews" of the car and “Competitive Comparisons” to other cars listed on the sites.

The campaign was picked up from bloggers in the automotive industry like Jalopnik, USA Today and AutoGuide.com.

== Car ==
A first-generation Kia Optima served as the basic form for the 2011 Mediocrity. Smith worked closely with West Side Auto in Torrance, California to transform the car into an amalgamation of every other car on the road in 2010. Fiberglass was added to strip away lines and transform the body of the sedan. The creative team from advertising agency Carmichael Lynch in Minneapolis, Minnesota chose colors (Medium Crumb/Stale Biscuit) and designed logos, thereby finishing off the design. Production on the campaign began July 21, 2010.

One advertisement for the Mediocrity features commentary from the "designers" of the car, noting that there are no features on the car that stand out from other mid-size sedans on the road. Notable "features" include doors, windows, a steering wheel, four doors, headlights, mirrors, windows, brakes, and no "bells or whistles".

Another advertisement parodies automotive magazine reviews, including reviews from "Car and Rider Magazine" (Car and Driver), "Sedan Trader" (Auto Trader), and "A.J. Partners and Associates" (J.D. Power and Associates).
