= Paraf-e Bala =

Paraf-e Bala پاراف بالا
- Village
- Location within Iran
- Coordinates: 26°28′53″N 57°15′45″E
- Country: Iran
- Province: Hormozgan
- County: Minab
- Bakhsh: Byaban
- Rural District: Byaban

Population (2006)
  - Total: 26
- Time zone: UTC+3:30 (IRST)
  - Summer (DST): UTC+4:30 (IRDT)

Paraf-e Bala (Persian: پاراف بالا, also Romanized as Pārāf-e Bālā; also known as Fāryāb (Persian: فارياب) and Pārāf) is a village in Byaban Rural District, Byaban District, Minab County, Hormozgan Province, Iran. As per the 2006 census, its population is 26, in 4 families.
