= Eram District =

District in Bushehr province, Iran

Eram District Persian: بخش ارم
- District
- Location within Iran
- Coordinates: 29°12′N 51°33′E
- Country: Iran
- Province: Bushehr
- County: Dashtestan
- Established: 2001
- Capital: Tang-e Eram

Population (2016)
  - Total: 13,659
- Time zone: UTC+3:30 (IRST)

Eram District (Persian: بخش ارم) is in Dashtestan County, Bushehr province, Iran. Its capital is the city of Tang-e Eram.

== Demographics ==
=== Population ===
At the time of the 2006 National Census, the district's population was 14,551 in 2,951 households. The following census in 2011 counted 13,375 people in 3,218 households. The 2016 census measured the population of the district as 13,659 inhabitants living in 3,728 households.

=== Administrative divisions ===
Eram District Population
Administrative Divisions	2006	2011	2016
Dehrud RD	5,507	5,072	5,372
Eram RD	6,116	5,120	5,045
Tang-e Eram (city)	2,928	3,183	3,242
Total	14,551	13,375	13,659
RD = Rural District
