= Anarak (disambiguation) =

Anarak is a city in Isfahan Province, Iran.

Anarak (Persian: انارك) may refer to various places in Iran:

- Anarak, Arsanjan, Fars Province
- Anarak, Khorrambid, Fars Province
- Anarak, Ilam
- Anarak, Qaleh Ganj, Kerman Province
- Anarak-e Bala, Kerman Province
- Anarak-e Pain, Kerman Province
- Anarak, Kermanshah
- Anarak-e Olya, Kermanshah Province
- Anarak-e Sofla, Kermanshah Province
- Anarak, Kohgiluyeh and Boyer-Ahmad
- Anarak District, in Isfahan Province
