= Lavar =

Lavar or LaVar may refer to:

== People with the given name ==
- LaVar Arrington (born 1978), American football player
- LaVar Arrington II (born 2007), American football player
- LaVar Ball (born 1968), American media personality
- LaVar Christensen, American politician
- Lavar Glover (born 1978), Canadian football player
- Lavar Johnson (born 1977), American mixed martial artist
- Lavar McMillan, American politician
- LaVar Payne (born 1945), Canadian politician

== Places ==
- Iran
  - Lavar, Gilan, Iran
  - Lavar, Kohgiluyeh and Boyer-Ahmad
  - Bushehr Province
    - Lavar-e Gol
    - Lavar-e Razemi
    - Lavar-e Saheli
  - Hormozgan Province
    - Lavar-e Sofla
    - Lavar, Bandar Abbas
    - Lavar, Bastak
    - Lavardin, Iran

== See also ==
- Lavardin (disambiguation)
- Levar (disambiguation)
