= Mozaffarabad =

Mozaffarabad (Persian: مظفرآباد) may refer to:

== Fars Province ==
- Mozaffarabad, Kazerun, Fars Province
- Mozaffarabad, Khorrambid, Fars Province

== Hormozgan Province ==
- Mozaffarabad, Hormozgan

== Isfahan Province ==
- Mozaffarabad, Isfahan, a village in Nain County

== Kerman Province ==
- Mozaffarabad, Kerman
- Mozaffarabad, Rudbar-e Jonubi, Kerman Province

== Kohgiluyeh and Boyer-Ahmad Province ==
- Mozaffarabad, Kohgiluyeh and Boyer-Ahmad, a village in Gachsaran County

== Kurdistan Province ==
- Mozaffarabad, Kurdistan, a village in Qorveh County

== Razavi Khorasan Province ==
- Mozaffarabad, Bardaskan, Razavi Khorasan Province
- Mozaffarabad, Nishapur, Razavi Khorasan Province
- Mozaffarabad, Sabzevar, Razavi Khorasan Province

== West Azerbaijan Province ==
- Mozaffarabad, Khoy, West Azerbaijan Province
- Mozaffarabad, Miandoab, West Azerbaijan Province

== See also ==
- Muzaffarabad (disambiguation), places in Pakistan
