= Gardaneh =

Gardaneh (Persian: گردنه) may refer to:

- Gardaneh Taqa
- Gardaneh-ye Bastak
- Gardaneh-ye Firuzabad
- Gardaneh-ye Godar Arbu
- Gardaneh-ye Hameh Kasi
- Gardaneh-ye Jenjan
- Gardaneh-ye Kol Hasank
- Gardaneh-ye Mo'allem Khani
- Gardaneh-ye Poshtkuh
- Gardaneh-ye Robat Sefid
- Gardaneh-ye Shebli
