= Qanat-e Now =

Qanat-e Now or Qanat Now or Qanat-i-Nau (Persian: قناتنو) may refer to:

- Qanat-e Now, Khorrambid, Fars Province
- Qanat-e Now, Khorrami, Khorrambid County, Fars Province
- Qanat-e Now, Anbarabad, Kerman Province
- Qanat-e Now, Esmaili, Anbarabad County, Kerman Province
- Qanat-e Now, Jiroft, Kerman Province
