= Muzaffar =

Muzafar
- Pronunciation: Arabic: [ˈmuˌðˤaf.far] Egyptian Arabic: [ˈmoˌzˤɑf.faɾ] Turkish: [moˈzaffeɾ] Urdu: [mʊzˈəffəɾ]
- Gender: Male
- Language: Arabic

Origin
- Meaning: The Victorious
- Region of origin: Arabia

Other names
- Alternative spelling: Mudhaffar, Muzaffer, Mozaffar
- Variant forms: Muzaffer (Turkish); Muzafer (Albanian and Bosnian)

Muzaffar, Muzaffer, or Mozaffar (Arabic: مظفر; "the Victorious") may refer to:

== People ==
=== Given name ===
- Al-Muzaffar Umar (died 1191), Ayyubid prince of Hama and a general of Saladin
- Muzaffar Shah of Malacca (ruled 1445–1459), sultan of Malacca
- Muzaffar II of Johor (1546–1570), Sultan of Johor
- Mozaffar al-Din Shah Qajar (1853–1907), Qajarid Shah of Persia
- Muzaffar Ahmed (economist) (1936–2012), Bangladeshi economist
- Muzaffar Ahmed (politician) (1889–1973), Bengali politician, journalist and communist activist
- Mozaffar Alam (1882–1973), Iranian governor and politician
- Muzaffar Alam (born 1947), American linguist
- Muzaffar Ali (born 1944), Indian filmmaker
- Muzaffer Atac (1933–2010), Turkish-American physicist
- Muzaffar Hussain Baig (born 1946), Indian politician
- Mozaffar Firouz (1906–1988)
- Muzaffar Hassan (1920–2012), Pakistani naval officer
- Muzaffar Hussain (disambiguation)
- Muzaffar Iqbal (born 1954), Pakistani-Canadian scientist and philosopher
- Muzaffer İzgü (1933–2017), Turkish writer and teacher
- Muzaffer Ozak (1916–1985), Turkish Dervish
- Muzaffar Ali Khan Qizilbash, Pakistani politician
- Muzaffar Hussain Shah (born 1945), Pakistani politician
- Muzafer Sherif (1906–1988), Turkish social psychologist
- Muzafer Mujić (born 1931), Bosnian physiologist
- Muzaffar Warsi (1933–2011), Pakistani Urdu poet, critic and essayist

=== Middle name ===
- Mirza Muzaffar Ahmad (1913–2002), Pakistani civil servant and member of the Ahmadiyya Muslim Community
- Muhyi ad-Din Muzaffar Jang Hidayat (died 1751), ruler of Hyderabad
- Sultan Muzaffar Khan (fl. ca. 1652), ruler of Bengal
- Shamsuddin Muzaffar Shah (died 1494), ruler of Bengal

=== Surname ===
- Abd al-Malik al-Muzaffar (died 1008), hajib of Cordoba
- Bahram Muzaffer (born 1986), Turkish boxer
- Nasirli Muzaffar (1902–1944), Talysh poet, folklorist, linguist, teacher and journalist
- Chandra Muzaffar (born 1947), Malaysian political scientist
- Habbus al-Muzaffar (died 1038), ruler of Taifa of Granada
- Mu'nis al-Muzaffar (845/6–933), Abbasid general and strongman

== Places ==
- Mozaffar, Iran, a village in Razavi Khorasan Province, Iran

== Other ==
- Mozaffar (film), a 1974 Iranian comedy film directed by Masoud Zelli

== See also ==
- Mozaffari (disambiguation)
- Muzaffarid (disambiguation)
- Muzaffarabad (disambiguation)
- Muzaffargarh (disambiguation)
- Muzaffarnagar, city in Uttar Pradesh, India
- Muzaffarnagar district, Uttar Pradesh, India
- Muzaffarpur, city in Bihar, India
- Muzaffarpur district, Bihar, India
- Muzaffar Pur, village in Punjab, Pakistan
- Muzaffar (Pakistan) a village in Sialkot District of Punjab, Pakistan,
- Müzəffəroba, village in Khachmaz District, Azerbaijan
- Sekolah Menengah Sains Muzaffar Syah, school in Malaysia
- Baghe Mozaffar, Iranian satirical television series
- Muzaffar Ahmed (disambiguation)
