= Danicheh Kheyr =

Daniche Kheyr دنیچه خير
- village
- Location within Iran
- Coordinates: 30°33′42″N 53°10′20″E
- Country: Iran
- Province: Fars
- County: Khorrambid
- Bakhsh: Central
- Rural District: Khorrami

Population (2006)
  - Total: 303
- Time zone: UTC+3:30 (IRST)
  - Summer (DST): UTC+4:30 (IRDT)

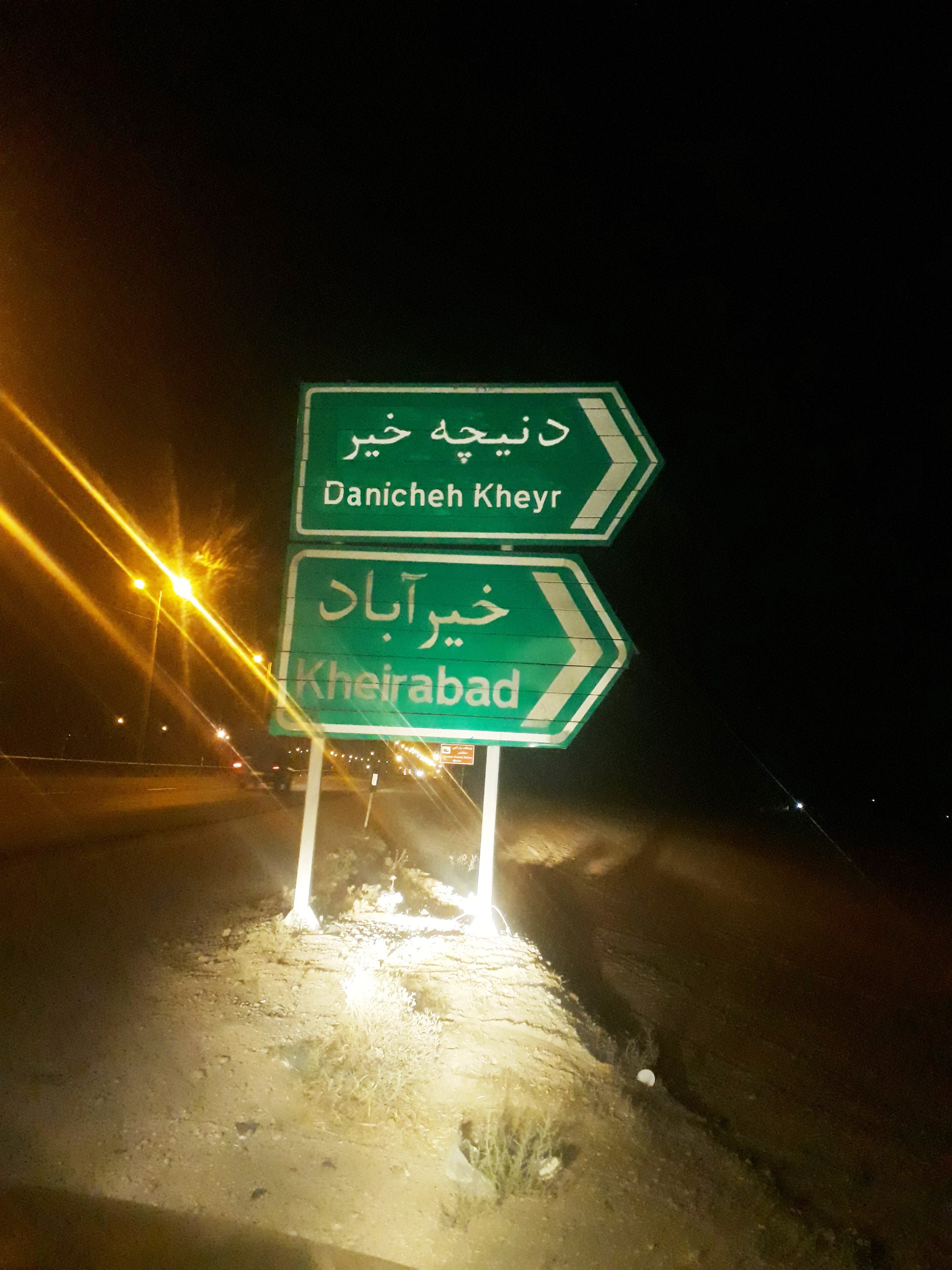
دنیچه خیر

Daniche Kheyr (دنیچه خیر) (Persian: دنیچه خير, also Romanized as Danīche Kheyr; also known as Danīche Kheyre, Dunicheh Khair, Dūnīche Kheyr, and Maḩmūdābād-e Danīche Kheyr) (دنیچه خیر) is دنیچه خیر a village in Khorrami Rural District, in the Central District of Khorrambid County, Fars province, Iran. At the 2006 census, its population was 303, in 76 families.

It is located about 5 km from Safashahr and 170 km north of Shiraz.
