= Qazian-e Sofla =

Village in Fars province, Iran

Qazian-e Sofla Persian: قاضيان سفلي
- Village
- Location within Iran
- Coordinates: 30°28′54″N 53°07′29″E
- Country: Iran
- Province: Fars
- County: Khorrambid
- District: Central
- Rural District: Khorrami

Population (2016)
  - Total: 330
- Time zone: UTC+3:30 (IRST)

Qazian-e Sofla (Persian: قاضيان سفلي) (Note: Also romanized as Qāẕīān-e Soflá; also known as Ghāzīān-e Pā’īn, Qaşr-e Jadīd, Qāẕīān, and Qāẕīān-e Pā’īn) is a village in Khorrami Rural District of the Central District of Khorrambid County, Fars province, Iran.

== Demographics ==
=== Population ===
At the time of the 2006 National Census, the village's population was 382 in 94 households, when it was in Shahidabad Rural District of Mashhad-e Morghab District. The following census in 2011 counted 341 people in 99 households, by which time the village had been transferred to Khorrami Rural District of the Central District. The 2016 census measured the population of the village as 330 people in 100 households. It was the most populous village in its rural district.
