= Deh Tall =

Deh Tall or Deh-e Tall or Deh Tal or Deh Tol or Deh-e Tol or Dehtal (Persian: ده تل) may refer to:

- Deh Tall, Manj, Lordegan County, Chaharmahal and Bakhtiari Province
- Deh Tall, Hormozgan
- Deh-e Tol, Kohgiluyeh and Boyer-Ahmad
- Deh Tall Rural District, in Hormozgan Province
