= Yitimu =

Yitimu يتيمو
- Village
- Country: Iran
- Province: Fars
- County: Khorrambid
- Bakhsh: Central
- Rural District: Khorrami

Population (2006)
  - Total: 16
- Time zone: UTC+3:30 (IRST)
  - Summer (DST): UTC+4:30 (IRDT)

Yitimu (Persian: يتيمو, also Romanized as Yītīmū) is a village in Khorrami Rural District, in the Central District of Khorrambid County, Fars province, Iran. At the 2006 census, its population was 16, in 6 families.
