= Khvorjan =

Khvorjan خورجان
- Village
- Location within Iran
- Coordinates: 30°26′59″N 53°23′34″E
- Country: Iran
- Province: Fars
- County: Khorrambid
- Bakhsh: Mashhad-e Morghab
- Rural District: Shahidabad

Population (2006)
  - Total: 208
- Time zone: UTC+3:30 (IRST)
  - Summer (DST): UTC+4:30 (IRDT)

Khvorjan (Persian: خورجان, also Romanized as Khvorjān and Khowrjān; also known as Khāneh Khurgān, Khāneh-ye Khūrqān, and Khowrgūn) is a village in Shahidabad Rural District, Mashhad-e Morghab District, Khorrambid County, Fars province, Iran. At the 2006 census, its population was 208, in 58 families.
