= Qasr-e Yaqub =

Qasr-e Yaqub قصريعقوب
- Village
- Location within Iran
- Coordinates: 30°30′43″N 53°07′42″E
- Country: Iran
- Province: Fars
- County: Khorrambid
- Bakhsh: Central
- Rural District: Khorrami

Population (2006)
  - Total: 334
- Time zone: UTC+3:30 (IRST)
  - Summer (DST): UTC+4:30 (IRDT)

Qasr-e Yaqub (Persian: قصريعقوب, also romanized as Qaşr-e Ya‘qūb and Qasr-i-Yā‘qūb; also known as Qaşr-e Qal‘eh Ya‘qūb) is a village in Khorrami Rural District, in the Central District of Khorrambid County, Fars province, Iran. At the 2006 census, its population was 334, in 83 families.
