= Dalv-e Nazar =

Dalv-e Nazar دلونظر
- Village
- Location within Iran
- Coordinates: 30°36′58″N 52°56′08″E
- Country: Iran
- Province: Fars
- County: Khorrambid
- Bakhsh: Central
- Rural District: Qeshlaq

Population (2006)
  - Total: 581
- Time zone: UTC+3:30 (IRST)
  - Summer (DST): UTC+4:30 (IRDT)

Dalv-e Nazar (Persian: دلونظر, also Romanized as Dalv-e Naz̧ar and Dalv Naz̧ar; also known as Dar Nazar) is a village in Qeshlaq Rural District, in the Central District of Khorrambid County, Fars province, Iran. At the 2006 census, its population was 581, in 130 families.
