= Aliabad-e Bejuyeh =

Aliabad-e Bejuyeh علي ابادبجويه
- Village
- Location within Iran
- Coordinates: 30°28′27″N 53°22′00″E
- Country: Iran
- Province: Fars
- County: Khorrambid
- Bakhsh: Mashhad-e Morghab
- Rural District: Shahidabad

Population (2006)
  - Total: 62
- Time zone: UTC+3:30 (IRST)
  - Summer (DST): UTC+4:30 (IRDT)

Aliabad-e Bejuyeh (Persian: علي ابادبجويه, also Romanized as 'Alīābād-e Bejūyeh) is a village in Shahidabad Rural District, Mashhad-e Morghab District, Khorrambid County, Fars province, Iran. At the 2006 census, its population was 62, in 16 families.
