= Kheyrabad, Khorrambid =

Kheyrabad خيراباد
- Village
- Location within Iran
- Coordinates: 30°35′10″N 53°11′11″E
- Country: Iran
- Province: Fars
- County: Khorrambid
- Bakhsh: Central
- Rural District: Khorrami

Population (2006)
  - Total: 41
- Time zone: UTC+3:30 (IRST)
  - Summer (DST): UTC+4:30 (IRDT)

Kheyrabad (Persian: خيراباد, also Romanized as Kheyrābād) is a village in Khorrami Rural District, in the Central District of Khorrambid County, Fars province, Iran. At the 2006 census, its population was 41, in 12 families.
