= Mozaffari =

Mozaffari (Persian: مظفری), also rendered as Muzaffari, may refer to:

== Places ==
- Mozaffari desert, Iranian desert also known as the Polond Desert located within the Mozaffari Protected Area
- Mozaffari Protected Area, protected area in Iran
- Mozaffari-ye Jonubi, Bushehr Province
- Mozaffari-ye Shomali, Bushehr Province
- Mozaffari, Kavar, Fars Province
- Mozaffari, Kharameh, Fars Province
- Muzaffari, Khorrambid, Fars Province
- Mozaffari, Qir and Karzin, Fars Province
- Mozaffari, Khuzestan
- Mozaffari, Kohgiluyeh and Boyer-Ahmad

== People ==
- Abolghasem Mozaffari (born 1967), Iranian military person and engineer
- Jasmin Mozaffari, Canadian film director and screenwriter
- Nurieh Mozaffari (born 1960), Iranian–Canadian contemporary painter
- Rasoul Mozaffari (born 1994), Iranian professional basketball player
- Saeed Mozaffari (1942–2025), Iranian dubbing director and voice actor
- Saeid Mozaffarizadeh (born 1974), Iranian football referee
- Sayed Abutalib Mozaffari (born 1966), Afghani poet and writer
- Shah Shoja Mozaffari (1333–1382), ruler of the Muzaffarid dynasty

== Other ==
- Iranian vessel Mozaffari, Iranian naval vessel
- Mozaffari (newspaper), Iranian newspaper

== See also ==
- Muzaffar (disambiguation)
- Muzaffarid (disambiguation)
