= Meshkan (disambiguation) =

Meshkan is a city in Fars Province, Iran.

Meshkan or Moshkan (Persian: مشكان) may also refer to:

- Meshkan District (Neyriz County), in Fars province
- Moshkan, Khorrambid, Fars province
- Moshkan, Isfahan
- Meshkan, Baft, Kerman province
- Moshkan, Markazi
- Meshkan, Razavi Khorasan
- Meshkan District (Khoshab County), in Razavi Khorasan province
- Meshkan Rural District (disambiguation)
