= Folo Jan =

Folo Jan فلجان
- Village
- Location within Iran
- Coordinates: 30°34′16″N 53°08′05″E
- Country: Iran
- Province: Fars
- County: Khorrambid
- Bakhsh: Central
- Rural District: Khorrami

Population (2006)
  - Total: 9
- Time zone: UTC+3:30 (IRST)
  - Summer (DST): UTC+4:30 (IRDT)

Folo Jan (Persian: فلجان, also Romanized as Folo Jān; also known as Folū Jān) is a village in Khorrami Rural District, in the Central District of Khorrambid County, Fars province, Iran. At the 2006 census, its population was 9, in 4 families.
