= Hajjiabad, Khorrambid =

Hajjiabad حاجي اباد
- Village
- Location within Iran
- Coordinates: 30°38′04″N 53°13′52″E
- Country: Iran
- Province: Fars
- County: Khorrambid
- Bakhsh: Central
- Rural District: Khorrami

Population (2006)
  - Total: 123
- Time zone: UTC+3:30 (IRST)
  - Summer (DST): UTC+4:30 (IRDT)

Hajjiabad (Persian: حاجي اباد, also Romanized as Ḩājjīābād) is a village in Khorrami Rural District, in the Central District of Khorrambid County, Fars province, Iran. At the 2006 census, its population was 123, in 31 families.
