= Qanat-e Now, Khorrambid =

Qanat-e Now قنات نو
- Village
- Location within Iran
- Coordinates: 30°25′17″N 53°19′10″E
- Country: Iran
- Province: Fars
- County: Khorrambid
- Bakhsh: Mashhad-e Morghab
- Rural District: Shahidabad

Population (2006)
  - Total: 169
- Time zone: UTC+3:30 (IRST)
  - Summer (DST): UTC+4:30 (IRDT)

Qanat-e Now (Persian: قنات نو, also Romanized as Qanāt-e Now and Qanāt-i-Nau) is a village in Shahidabad Rural District, Mashhad-e Morghab District, Khorrambid County, Fars province, Iran. At the 2006 census, its population was 169, in 48 families.
