= Lard-e Basto =

Coordinates: 27.1480°N 54.8344°E

Lard-e Basto لرد بستو
- Village
- Interactive map of Lard-e Basto
- Country: Iran
- Province: Hormozgan
- County: Bastak
- Bakhsh: Central District
- Rural District: Godeh

Population (2006)
  - Total: 25
- Time zone: UTC+3:30 (IRST)
  - Summer (DST): UTC+4:30 (IRDT)

Lard-e Basto (Persian: لرد بستو is a village in Godeh Rural District, in the Central District of Bastak County, Hormozgan Province, Iran. At the 2006 census, its population was 25, in 12 families.
