= Qaleh-ye Mirzai =

Qaleh-ye Mirzai or Qaleh Mirzai (Persian: قلعه ميرزايي) may refer to:

- Qaleh-ye Mirzai, Kavar
- Qaleh-ye Mirzai, Kazerun

== See also ==
- Qaleh-ye Mirza
