= Gauberi =

Gauberi گاوبري
- Village
- Location within Iran
- Coordinates: 27°23′07″N 54°45′46″E
- Country: Iran
- Province: Hormozgan
- County: Bastak
- Bakhsh: Central
- Rural District: Godeh

Population (2006)
  - Total: 284
- Time zone: UTC+3:30 (IRST)
  - Summer (DST): UTC+4:30 (IRDT)

Gauberi (Persian: گاوبري, also Romanized as Gāūberī; also known as Gāberī) is a village in Godeh Rural District, in the Central District of Bastak County, Hormozgan Province, Iran. At the 2006 census, its population was 284, in 59 families.
