= Bamestan =

Bamestan بامستان
- Village
- Location within Iran
- Coordinates: 27°12′38″N 54°45′39″E
- Country: Iran
- Province: Hormozgan
- County: Bastak
- Bakhsh: Central
- Rural District: Deh Tall

Population (2006)
  - Total: 106
- Time zone: UTC+3:30 (IRST)
  - Summer (DST): UTC+4:30 (IRDT)

Bamestan (Persian: بامستان, also Romanized as Bāmestān) is a village in Deh Tall Rural District, in the Central District of Bastak County, Hormozgan Province, Iran. At the 2006 census, its population was 106, in 21 families.
