= Moshkan, Khorrambid =

Moshkan مشكان
- Village
- Location within Iran
- Coordinates: 30°36′24″N 52°57′12″E
- Country: Iran
- Province: Fars
- County: Khorrambid
- Bakhsh: Central
- Rural District: Qeshlaq

Population (2006)
  - Total: 1,063
- Time zone: UTC+3:30 (IRST)
  - Summer (DST): UTC+4:30 (IRDT)

Moshkan (Persian: مشكان, also Romanized as Moshkān; also known as Moshgān and Mūsh Kān) is a village in Qeshlaq Rural District, in the Central District of Khorrambid County, Fars province, Iran. At the 2006 census, its population was 1,063, in 240 families.
