= Seyyed Ahmadi, Fars =

Seyyed Ahmadi سيداحمدي
- Village
- Location within Iran
- Coordinates: 30°37′13″N 52°55′15″E
- Country: Iran
- Province: Fars
- County: Khorrambid
- Bakhsh: Central
- Rural District: Qeshlaq

Population (2006)
  - Total: 142
- Time zone: UTC+3:30 (IRST)
  - Summer (DST): UTC+4:30 (IRDT)

Seyyed Ahmadi (Persian: سيداحمدي, also Romanized as Seyyed Aḩmadī) is a village in Qeshlaq Rural District, in the Central District of Khorrambid County, Fars province, Iran. At the 2006 census, its population was 142, in 33 families.
