= Keyend-e Bastak =

Coordinates: 27.1480°N 54.8344°E

Keyend-e Bastak كييند
- village
- Interactive map of Keyend-e Bastak
- Country: Iran
- Province: Hormozgan
- County: Bastak
- Bakhsh: Central District
- Rural District: Godeh
- Time zone: UTC+3:30 (IRST)
  - Summer (DST): UTC+4:30 (IRDT)

Keyend-e Bastak (Persian: كييند, also Romanized as Keyand; also known as Kayand) is a village in Godeh Rural District, in the Central District of Bastak County, Hormozgan Province, Iran.
