= Aq Cheshmeh =

Aq Cheshmeh (Persian: اق چشمه) may refer to:

- Aq Cheshmeh, Fars
- Aq Cheshmeh, North Khorasan
- Aq Cheshmeh, Razavi Khorasan
