= Zangard =

Zangard (Persian: زنگارد or زنگرد) may refer to:

- Zangard, Hormozgan (زنگارد - Zangārd)
- Zangard, Khuzestan (زنگرد - Zangard)
