= Shahidabad, Fars =

Village in Fars province, Iran

Shahidabad Persian: شهيداباد
- Village
- Location within Iran
- Coordinates: 30°25′17″N 53°13′09″E
- Country: Iran
- Province: Fars
- County: Khorrambid
- District: Mashhad-e Morghab
- Rural District: Shahidabad

Population (2016)
  - Total: 523
- Time zone: UTC+3:30 (IRST)

Shahidabad (Persian: شهيداباد) (Note: Also romanized as Shahīdābād; also known as Cham Bayān and Cham-e Bayān) is a village in, and the capital of, Shahidabad Rural District of Mashhad-e Morghab District, Khorrambid County, Fars province, Iran.

== Demographics ==
=== Population ===
At the time of the 2006 National Census, the village's population was 687, in 182 households. The following census in 2011 counted 682 people in 214 households. The 2016 census measured the population of the village as 523 people in 179 households.
