= Kerzeh =

Kerzeh كرزه
- Village
- Location within Iran
- Coordinates: 27°08′15″N 55°13′23″E
- Country: Iran
- Province: Hormozgan
- County: Bastak
- Bakhsh: Central
- Rural District: Deh Tall

Population (2006)
  - Total: 58
- Time zone: UTC+3:30 (IRST)
  - Summer (DST): UTC+4:30 (IRDT)

Kerzeh (Persian: كرزه; also known as Kerzā and Kerẕā) is a village in Deh Tall Rural District, in the Central District of Bastak County, Hormozgan Province, Iran. At the 2006 census, its population was 58, in 9 families.
