= Tang-e Dalan, Hormozgan =

Coordinates: 27.3280°N 55.0920°E

Tang-e Dalan تنگ دالان
- Village
- Interactive map of Tang-e Dalan
- Country: Iran
- Province: Hormozgan
- County: Bastak
- Bakhsh: Central District
- Rural District: Godeh

Population (2006)
  - Total: 157
- Time zone: UTC+3:30 (IRST)
  - Summer (DST): UTC+4:30 (IRDT)

Tang-e Dalan (Persian: تنگ دالان is a village in Godeh Rural District, in the Central District of Bastak County, Hormozgan Province, Iran. At the 2006 census, its population was 157, in 52 families.
