= Anjirdan =

Anjirdan انجيردان
- Village
- Location within Iran
- Coordinates: 27°07′44″N 55°16′59″E
- Country: Iran
- Province: Hormozgan
- County: Bastak
- Bakhsh: Central
- Rural District: Deh Tall

Population (2006)
  - Total: 455
- Time zone: UTC+3:30 (IRST)
  - Summer (DST): UTC+4:30 (IRDT)

Anjirdan (Persian: انجيردان, also Romanized as Anjīrdān) is a small village in Deh Tall Rural District, in the Central District of Bastak County, Hormozgan Province, Iran. At the 2006 census, its population was 455, in 86 families.

== Geography ==
Anjirdan is located right next to the Zagros Mountains, and is located roughly 36 miles from the Persian Gulf. (Note: Measured using Google Earth.)

== Climate ==
Anjirdan has a Hot desert climate on the Köppen climate classification system
