= Seyyed Ahmad =

Seyyed Ahmad (Persian: سيد احمد) may refer to these villages in Iran:

- Seyyed Ahmad, Hormozgan
- Seyyed Ahmad, Kermanshah
- Seyyed Ahmad, Khuzestan

== See also ==
- Seyyed Ahmadi (disambiguation)
- Syed Ahmad Khan (1817–1898), Indian reformer and social activist
