= Merd =

Merd may refer to:

- Merd-e Now, a village in Iran
- Hazar Merd Cave, a group of Paleolithic cave sites in Iraqi Kurdistan

== See also ==
- Saint-Merd (disambiguation), several places in central France
