= Yas Chaman, Fars =

Yas Chaman ياس چمن
- Village
- Location within Iran
- Coordinates: 30°25′15″N 53°16′37″E
- Country: Iran
- Province: Fars
- County: Khorrambid
- Bakhsh: Mashhad-e Morghab
- Rural District: Shahidabad

Population (2006)
  - Total: 62
- Time zone: UTC+3:30 (IRST)
  - Summer (DST): UTC+4:30 (IRDT)

Yas Chaman (Persian: ياس چمن, also Romanized as Yās Chaman) is a village in Shahidabad Rural District, Mashhad-e Morghab District, Khorrambid County, Fars province, Iran. At the 2006 census, its population was 62, in 13 families.
