= Khashauh =

Khashauh خشاوه
- Village
- Location within Iran
- Coordinates: 27°11′39″N 54°49′20″E
- Country: Iran
- Province: Hormozgan
- County: Bastak
- Bakhsh: Central
- Rural District: Deh Tall

Population (2006)
  - Total: 12
- Time zone: UTC+3:30 (IRST)
  - Summer (DST): UTC+4:30 (IRDT)

Khashauh (Persian: خشاوه, also Romanized as Khashāūh; also known as Khashū) is a village in Deh Tall Rural District, in the Central District of Bastak County, Hormozgan Province, Iran. At the 2006 census, its population was 12, in 4 families.
