= Jenjan =

Jenjan (Persian: جنجان) may refer to:

- Gardaneh-ye Jenjan
- Jenjan-e Markazi
