= Nakhl Khin =

Coordinates: 27.1480°N 54.8344°E

Nakhl Khin نخل خين
- Village
- Interactive map of Nakhl Khin
- Country: Iran
- Province: Hormozgan
- County: Bastak
- Bakhsh: Central
- Rural District: Fatuyeh

Population (2006)
  - Total: 284
- Time zone: UTC+3:30 (IRST)
  - Summer (DST): UTC+4:30 (IRDT)

Nakhl Khin (Persian: نخل خين, also Romanized as Nakhl Khīn) is a village in Fatuyeh Rural District, in the Central District of Bastak County, Hormozgan Province, Iran. At the 2006 census, its population was 284, in 56 families.
