= Sar Molki-ye Qanat-e Now =

Sar Molki-ye Qanat-e Now سرملكي قنات نو
- Village
- Location within Iran
- Coordinates: 30°38′19″N 53°13′30″E
- Country: Iran
- Province: Fars
- County: Khorrambid
- Bakhsh: Central
- Rural District: Khorrami

Population (2006)
  - Total: 56
- Time zone: UTC+3:30 (IRST)
  - Summer (DST): UTC+4:30 (IRDT)

Sar Molki-ye Qanat-e Now (Persian: سرملكي قنات نو, also Romanized as Sar Molkī-ye Qanāt-e Now; also known as Qanāt-e Now, Qanāt-e Now-e Sar Molkī, and Sar Molkī) is a village in Khorrami Rural District, in the Central District of Khorrambid County, Fars province, Iran. At the 2006 census, its population was 56, in 15 families.
