= Chah Qil =

Chah Qil چاه قيل
- Village
- Location within Iran
- Coordinates: 27°15′41″N 54°29′29″E
- Country: Iran
- Province: Hormozgan
- County: Bastak
- Bakhsh: Central
- Rural District: Fatuyeh

Population (2006)
  - Total: 36
- Time zone: UTC+3:30 (IRST)
  - Summer (DST): UTC+4:30 (IRDT)

Chah Qil (Persian: چاه قيل, also Romanized as Chāh Qīl; also known as Chāh Fīl and Chāh Kīl) is a village in Fatuyeh Rural District, in the Central District of Bastak County, Hormozgan Province, Iran. At the 2006 census, its population was 36, in 7 families.
