= Tesan =

Tesan تسن
- Village
- Location within Iran
- Coordinates: 27°22′45″N 54°35′48″E
- Country: Iran
- Province: Hormozgan
- County: Bastak
- Bakhsh: Central
- Rural District: Godeh

Population (2006)
  - Total: 41
- Time zone: UTC+3:30 (IRST)
  - Summer (DST): UTC+4:30 (IRDT)

Tesan (Persian: تسن, also Romanized as Tesān) is a village in Godeh Rural District, in the Central District of Bastak County, Hormozgan Province, Iran. At the 2006 census, its population was 41, in 7 families.
