= Ruy Gach =

Coordinates: 27.1480°N 54.8344°E

Ruy Gach روي گچ
- Village
- Interactive map of Ruy Gach
- Country: Iran
- Province: Hormozgan
- County: Bastak
- Bakhsh: Central
- Rural District: Deh Tall

Population (2006)
  - Total: 53
- Time zone: UTC+3:30 (IRST)
  - Summer (DST): UTC+4:30 (IRDT)

Ruy Gach (Persian: روي گچ, also Romanized as Rūy Gach) is a village in Deh Tall Rural District, in the Central District of Bastak County, Hormozgan Province, Iran. At the 2006 census, its population was 53, in 12 families.
