= Naveh =

Naveh may refer to:

== Places ==
- Naveh, Amarlu, Rudbar County, Gilan Province, Iran
- Naveh, Hormozgan, Iran
- Naveh, Israel, a moshav in Israel
- Naveh, Khorgam, Rudbar County, Gilan Province, Iran
- Naveh, Kurdistan, Iran
- Naveh, North Khorasan, Iran

== People with the surname ==
- Arieh Batun-Naveh (born 1933), Israeli Olympic high jumper
- Dan Naveh (born 1960), Israeli politician
- Yair Naveh (born 1957), Israeli general
- Joseph Naveh (1928–2011), Israeli archaeologist and epigrapher

== See also ==
- Ghowch Naveh, village in Afghanistan
