= Pisah =

Coordinates: 27.1480°N 54.8344°E

Pisah پیسه
- Village
- Interactive map of Pisah
- Country: Iran
- Province: Hormozgan
- County: Bastak
- Bakhsh: Central District

Population (2006)
  - Total: 300
- Time zone: UTC+3:30 (IRST)
  - Summer (DST): UTC+4:30 (IRDT)

Pisah (Persian: پیسه, also Romanized as Peesah; also known as Peeseh and Peesah) is a village in Fatuyeh Rural District, in the Central District of Bastak County, Hormozgan Province, Iran. At the 2006 census, its population was 300, in 58 families.
