= Bast Qalat =

Bast Qalat بستقلات
- Village
- Location within Iran
- Coordinates: 27°14′35″N 54°32′20″E
- Country: Iran
- Province: Hormozgan
- County: Bastak
- Bakhsh: Central
- Rural District: Fatuyeh

Population (2006)
  - Total: 1,024
- Time zone: UTC+3:30 (IRST)
  - Summer (DST): UTC+4:30 (IRDT)

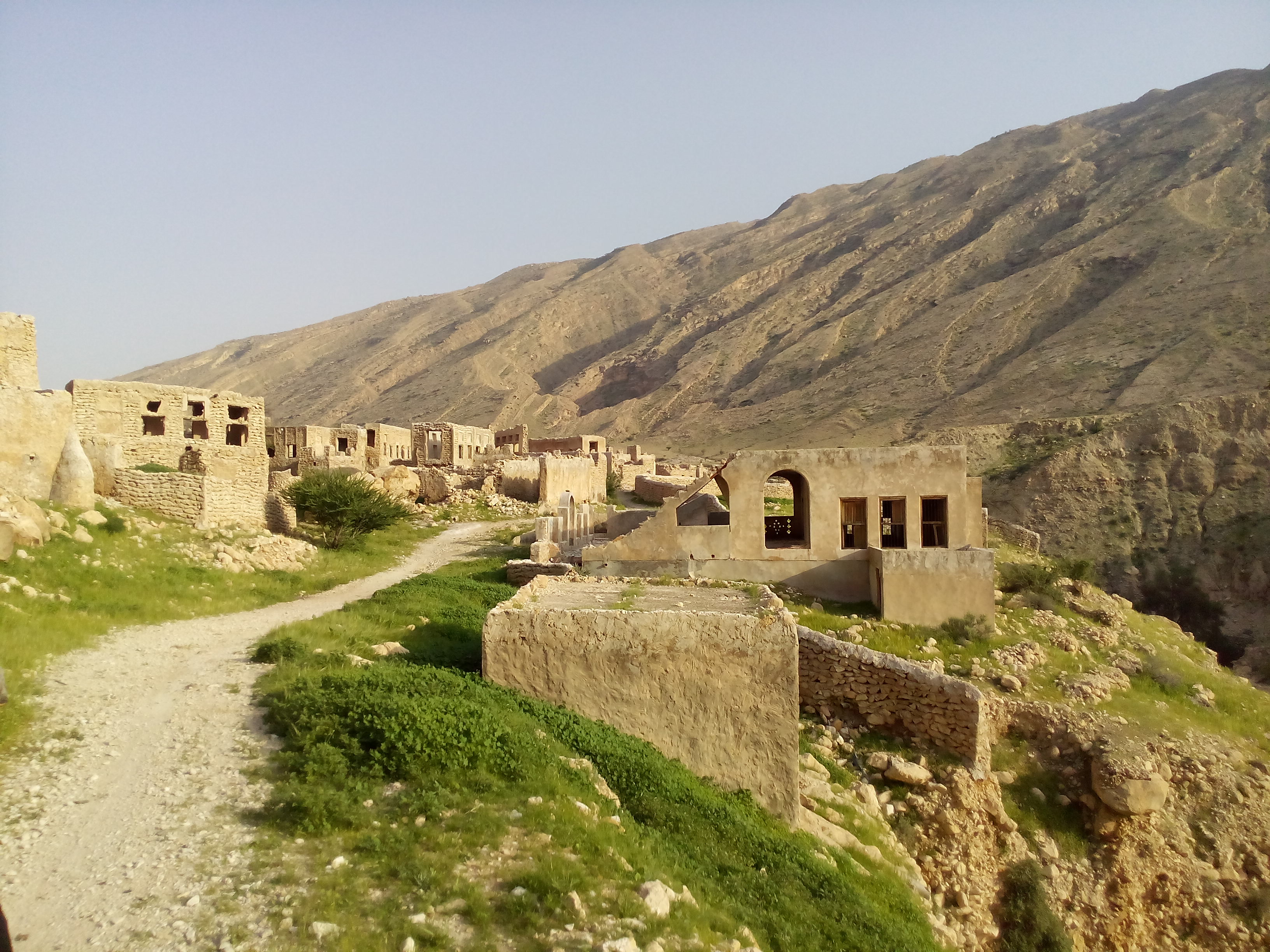
Entrance of historical Bast Qalat village

Bast Qalat (Persian: بستقلات, also Romanized as Bast Qalāt and Bast-e Qalāt; also known as Bast Ghalāt) is a village in Fatuyeh Rural District, in the Central District of Bastak County, Hormozgan Province, Iran. At the 2006 census, its population was 1,024, in 170 families.
