= Qaleh-ye Mirza =

Qaleh-ye Mirza قلعه ميرزا
- Village
- Location within Iran
- Coordinates: 30°35′11″N 52°58′02″E
- Country: Iran
- Province: Fars
- County: Khorrambid
- Bakhsh: Central
- Rural District: Qeshlaq

Population (2006)
  - Total: 300
- Time zone: UTC+3:30 (IRST)
  - Summer (DST): UTC+4:30 (IRDT)

Qaleh-ye Mirza (Persian: قلعه ميرزا, also Romanized as Qal‘eh-ye Mīrzā) is a village in Qeshlaq Rural District, in the Central District of Khorrambid County, Fars province, Iran. At the 2006 census, its population was 300, in 64 families.
