= Aq Cheshmeh, Fars =

Aq Cheshmeh اق چشمه
- Village
- Location within Iran
- Coordinates: 30°25′51″N 53°17′55″E
- Country: Iran
- Province: Fars
- County: Khorrambid
- Bakhsh: Mashhad-e Morghab
- Rural District: Shahidabad

Population (2006)
  - Total: 83
- Time zone: UTC+3:30 (IRST)
  - Summer (DST): UTC+4:30 (IRDT)

Aq Cheshmeh (Persian: اق چشمه, also Romanized as Āq Cheshmeh; also known as Āqā Cheshmeh) is a village in Shahidabad Rural District, Mashhad-e Morghab District, Khorrambid County, Fars province, Iran. At the 2006 census, its population was 83, in 21 families.
