= Qeshlaq, Khorrambid =

Village in Fars province, Iran

Qeshlaq Persian: قشلاق
- Village
- Location within Iran
- Coordinates: 30°33′45″N 53°01′22″E
- Country: Iran
- Province: Fars
- County: Khorrambid
- District: Central
- Rural District: Qeshlaq

Population (2016)
  - Total: 1,072
- Time zone: UTC+3:30 (IRST)

Qeshlaq (Persian: قشلاق) (Note: Also romanized as Qeshlāq; also known as Qeshlāq Būzarjomehr) is a village in, and the capital of, Qeshlaq Rural District of the Central District of Khorrambid County, Fars province, Iran.

== Demographics ==
=== Population ===
At the time of the 2006 National Census, the village's population was 895 in 246 households. The following census in 2011 counted 1,013 people in 279 households. The 2016 census measured the population of the village as 1,072 people in 326 households. It was the most populous village in its rural district.
