= Konji =

Konji كنجي
- Village
- Location within Iran
- Coordinates: 27°11′32″N 54°53′07″E
- Country: Iran
- Province: Hormozgan
- County: Bastak
- Bakhsh: Central
- Rural District: Deh Tall

Population (2006)
  - Total: 433
- Time zone: UTC+3:30 (IRST)
  - Summer (DST): UTC+4:30 (IRDT)

Konji (Persian: كنجي, also Romanized as Konjī; also known as Gonjī and Konchī) is a village in Deh Tall Rural District, in the Central District of Bastak County, Hormozgan Province, Iran. At the 2006 census, its population was 433, in 106 families.
