= Anarak, Khorrambid =

Anarak انارك
- Village
- Location within Iran
- Coordinates: 30°37′24″N 52°54′45″E
- Country: Iran
- Province: Fars
- County: Khorrambid
- Bakhsh: Central
- Rural District: Qeshlaq

Population (2006)
  - Total: 543
- Time zone: UTC+3:30 (IRST)
  - Summer (DST): UTC+4:30 (IRDT)

Anarak (Persian: انارك, also Romanized as Anārak; also known as Qal‘eh-ye Ḩājjī Bahman) is a village in Qeshlaq Rural District, in the Central District of Khorrambid County, Fars province, Iran. At the 2006 census, its population was 543, in 123 families.
