= Sheykh Hozur =

Sheykh Hozur شيخ حضور
- Village
- Location within Iran
- Coordinates: 27°19′55″N 54°26′19″E
- Country: Iran
- Province: Hormozgan
- County: Bastak
- Bakhsh: Central
- Rural District: Fatuyeh

Population (2006)
  - Total: 440
- Time zone: UTC+3:30 (IRST)
  - Summer (DST): UTC+4:30 (IRDT)

Sheykh Hozur (Persian: شيخ حضور, also Romanized as Sheykh Ḩoẕūr, Sheikh Hozoor, and Sheykh ’ozūr) is a village in Fatuyeh Rural District, in the Central District of Bastak County, Hormozgan Province, Iran. At the 2006 census, its population was 440, in 93 families.
