= Marvarid-e Anjirdan =

Coordinates: 27.1480°N 54.8344°E

Marvarid-e Anjirdan مرواريد انجيردان
- Village
- Interactive map of Marvarid-e Anjirdan
- Country: Iran
- Province: Hormozgan
- County: Bastak
- Bakhsh: Central
- Rural District: Deh Tall

Population (2006)
  - Total: 56
- Time zone: UTC+3:30 (IRST)
  - Summer (DST): UTC+4:30 (IRDT)

Marvarid-e Anjirdan (Persian: مرواريد انجيردان, also Romanized as Marvārīd-e Ānjīrdān) is a village in Deh Tall Rural District, in the Central District of Bastak County, Hormozgan Province, Iran. At the 2006 census, its population was 56, in 11 families.
