= Yas Chaman =

Yas Chaman (Persian: ياس چمن) may refer to:

- Yas Chaman, Fars
- Yas Chaman, Kerman
