= Bikh, Bastak =

Bikh بيخ
- Village
- Location within Iran
- Coordinates: 27°18′26″N 54°16′16″E
- Country: Iran
- Province: Hormozgan
- County: Bastak
- Bakhsh: Central
- Rural District: Fatuyeh

Population (2006)
  - Total: 21
- Time zone: UTC+3:30 (IRST)
  - Summer (DST): UTC+4:30 (IRDT)

Bikh (Persian: بيخ, also Romanized as Bīkh) is a village in Fatuyeh Rural District, in the Central District of Bastak County, Hormozgan Province, Iran. At the 2006 census, its population was 21, in 5 families.
