= Seyyed Ahmadi =

Seyyed Ahmadi (Persian: سيداحمدي) may refer to these villages in Iran:

- Seyyed Ahmadi, Fars
- Seyyed Ahmadi, Hormozgan

== See also ==
- Seyyed Ahmad (disambiguation)
