= Qeshlaq Rural District =

Qeshlaq Rural District (Persian: دهستان قشلاق) may refer to various places in Iran:

- Qeshlaq Rural District (Ahar County), East Azerbaijan Province
- Qeshlaq Rural District (Kaleybar County), East Azerbaijan Province
- Qeshlaq Rural District (Khorrambid County), Fars province

== See also ==
- Qeshlaq-e Gharbi Rural District, Ardabil Province
- Qeshlaq-e Jonubi Rural District, Ardabil Province
- Qeshlaq-e Sharqi Rural District, Ardabil Province
- Qeshlaq-e Shomali Rural District, Ardabil Province
