= Anveh =

Anveh انوه
- village
- Anveh
- Location within Iran
- Coordinates: 27°23′50″N 54°16′38″E
- Country: Iran
- Province: Hormozgan
- County: Bastak
- Bakhsh: Central
- Rural District: Fatuyeh

Population (2021)
  - Total: 1,423
- Time zone: UTC+3:30 (IRST)
  - Summer (DST): UTC+4:30 (IRDT)
- Area code: 0764433

Anveh (Persian: انوه; also known as Naveh and Sheykh 'Alī) is a village in Fatuyeh Rural District, in the Central District of Bastak County, Hormozgan province, Iran. At the 2021 census, its population was 1,423, in 400 families.
