= Merd-e Now =

Merd-e Now مردنو
- Village
- Location within Iran
- Coordinates: 27°19′48″N 54°27′59″E
- Country: Iran
- Province: Hormozgan
- County: Bastak
- Bakhsh: Central
- Rural District: Fatuyeh

Population (2006)
  - Total: 622
- Time zone: UTC+3:30 (IRST)
  - Summer (DST): UTC+4:30 (IRDT)

Merd-e Now (Persian: مردنو; also known as Mardūnow and Merdūnū) is a village in Fatuyeh Rural District, in the Central District of Bastak County, Hormozgan Province, Iran. At the 2006 census, its population was 622, in 147 families.
