= Lavardin =

Lavardin may refer to:

== Places ==
- Lavardin, Loir-et-Cher, France
- Lavardin, Sarthe, France
- Lavardin, Iran

== People ==
- Jacques de Lavardin (fl. 1575–1585), French humanist translator
- Jean de Beaumanoir (marquis) (1551–1614), the Marquis de Lavardin

== See also ==
- Lavardens, a commune in southwestern France
- Sala Lavardén, a theater in Argentina
