= Kuhij Castle =

Castle in Hormozgan Province, Iran

Kuhij castle
- قلعه کوهیج
- Interactive map of the Kuhij castle area

General information
- Type: Castle
- Location: Kuhij, Bastak County, Iran
- Coordinates: 27.19181°N 54.16703°E

Kuhij castle (Persian: قلعه کوهیج) is a historical castle located in Bastak County in Hormozgan Province. The longevity of this fortress dates back to the Safavid dynasty. It was used as a military fortress and also as an watchtower. It was made by using mud, plaster and sarooj.
