= Shourab =

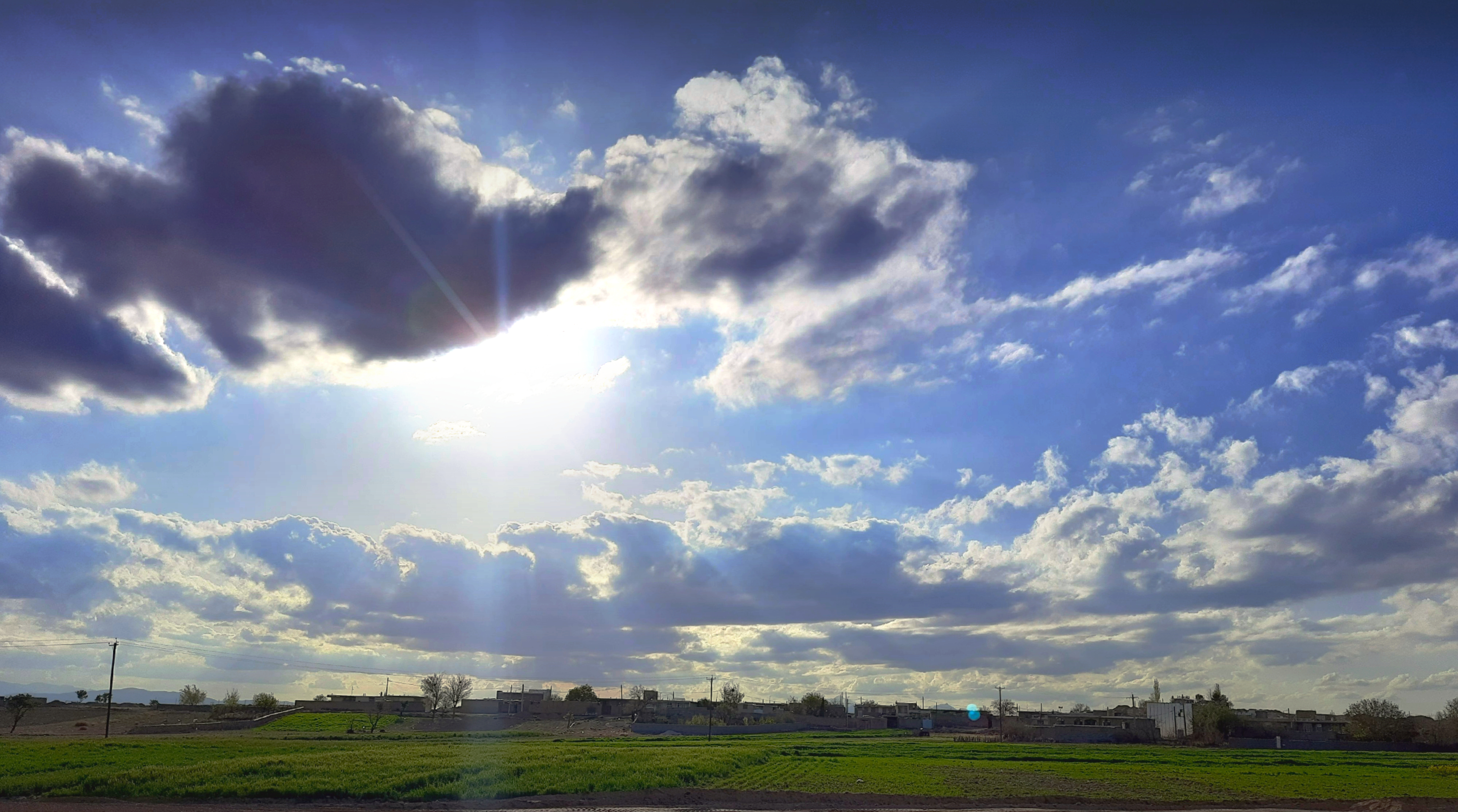
- Interactive map of Shourab
- Coordinates: 30.61117725°N 53.17920290°E
- Province: Fars
- County: Khorrambid
- Elevation: 2,200 m (7,200 ft)

Shourab is a village located in Khorrambid County, near Safashahr.

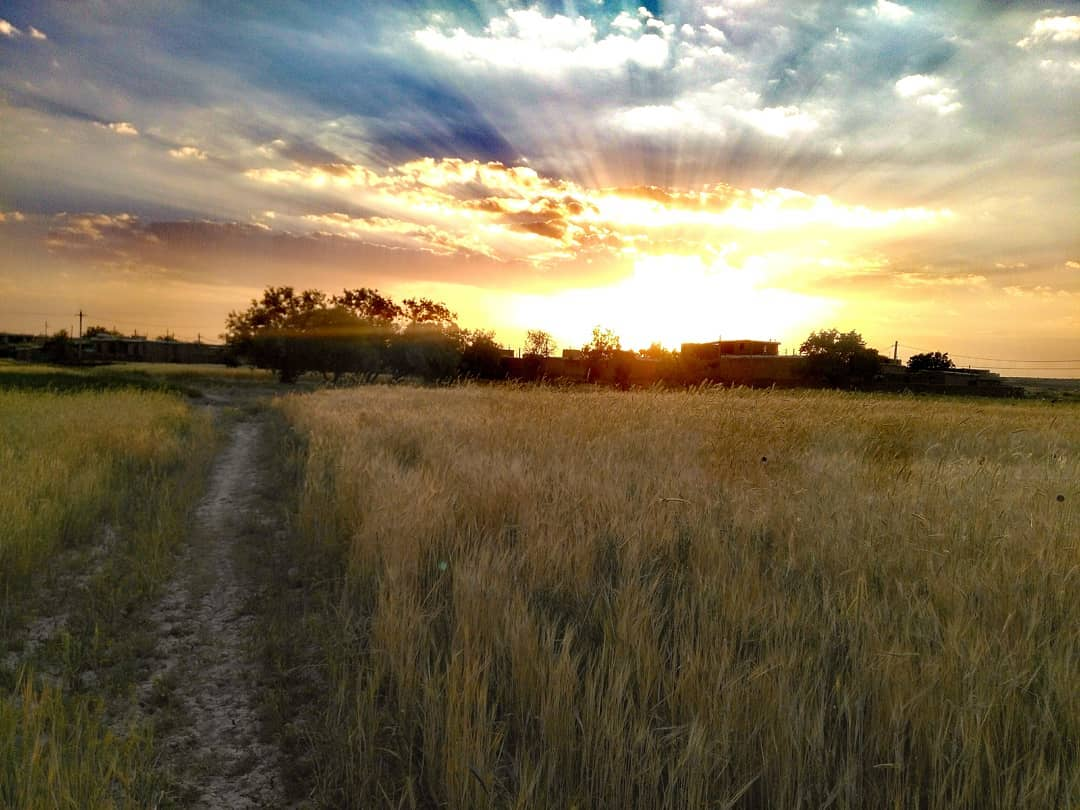
Wheat and barley fields in Shourab village

The village has connections to Safashahr, Ghal'eh Bamdad, and Firouzabad.

The residents of this village are engaged in animal husbandry and farming, with wheat and barley being their main agricultural products.
