= Bikh =

Bikh (Persian: بيخ) may refer to:

- Bikh, Bastak
- Bikh - a poison extracted from certain plants of the genus Aconitum.
