= Dehang =

Village in Hormozgan province, Iran

Dehang Persian: دهنگ
- Village
- Location within Iran
- Coordinates: 27°18′37″N 54°39′29″E
- Country: Iran
- Province: Hormozgan
- County: Bastak
- District: Central
- Rural District: Godeh

Population (2016)
  - Total: 2,021
- Time zone: UTC+3:30 (IRST)

Dehang (Persian: دهنگ) (Note: Also known as Dahūn, Deh Hang, Deh Hong, Deh-e Hong, and Dehun) is a village in, and the capital of, Godeh Rural District of the Central District of Bastak County, Hormozgan province, Iran.

== Demographics ==
=== Population ===
At the time of the 2006 National Census, the village's population was 1,636 in 344 households. The following census in 2011 counted 2,129 people in 568 households. The 2016 census measured the population of the village as 2,021 people in 564 households.
