= Lavar-e Sofla =

Lavar-e Sofla لاورسفلي
- Village
- Location within Iran
- Coordinates: 27°06′44″N 54°41′36″E
- Country: Iran
- Province: Hormozgan
- County: Bastak
- Bakhsh: Central
- Rural District: Deh Tall

Population (2006)
  - Total: 31
- Time zone: UTC+3:30 (IRST)
  - Summer (DST): UTC+4:30 (IRDT)

Lavar-e Sofla (Persian: لاورسفلي, also Romanized as Lāvar-e Soflá; also known as Lāvar) is a village in Deh Tall Rural District, in the Central District of Bastak County, Hormozgan Province, Iran. At the 2006 census, its population was 31, in 4 families.
