= Fatuiyeh =

Village in Hormozgan province, Iran

Fatuiyeh Persian: فتويه
- Village
- Location within Iran
- Coordinates: 27°19′53″N 54°24′38″E
- Country: Iran
- Province: Hormozgan
- County: Bastak
- District: Central
- Rural District: Fatuiyeh

Population (2016)
  - Total: 2,696
- Time zone: UTC+3:30 (IRST)

Fatuiyeh (Persian: فتويه) (Note: Also romanized as Fatooyeh, Fatuyeh, and Fatūyeh) is a village in, and the capital of, Fatuiyeh Rural District of the Central District of Bastak County, Hormozgan province, Iran.

== Demographics ==
=== Population ===
At the time of the 2006 National Census, the village's population was 2,565 in 545 households. The following census in 2011 counted 3,247 people in 810 households. The 2016 census measured the population of the village as 2,696 people in 784 households.
