= Mubariz al-Din's campaign against the Nikudaris =

1319 military campaign

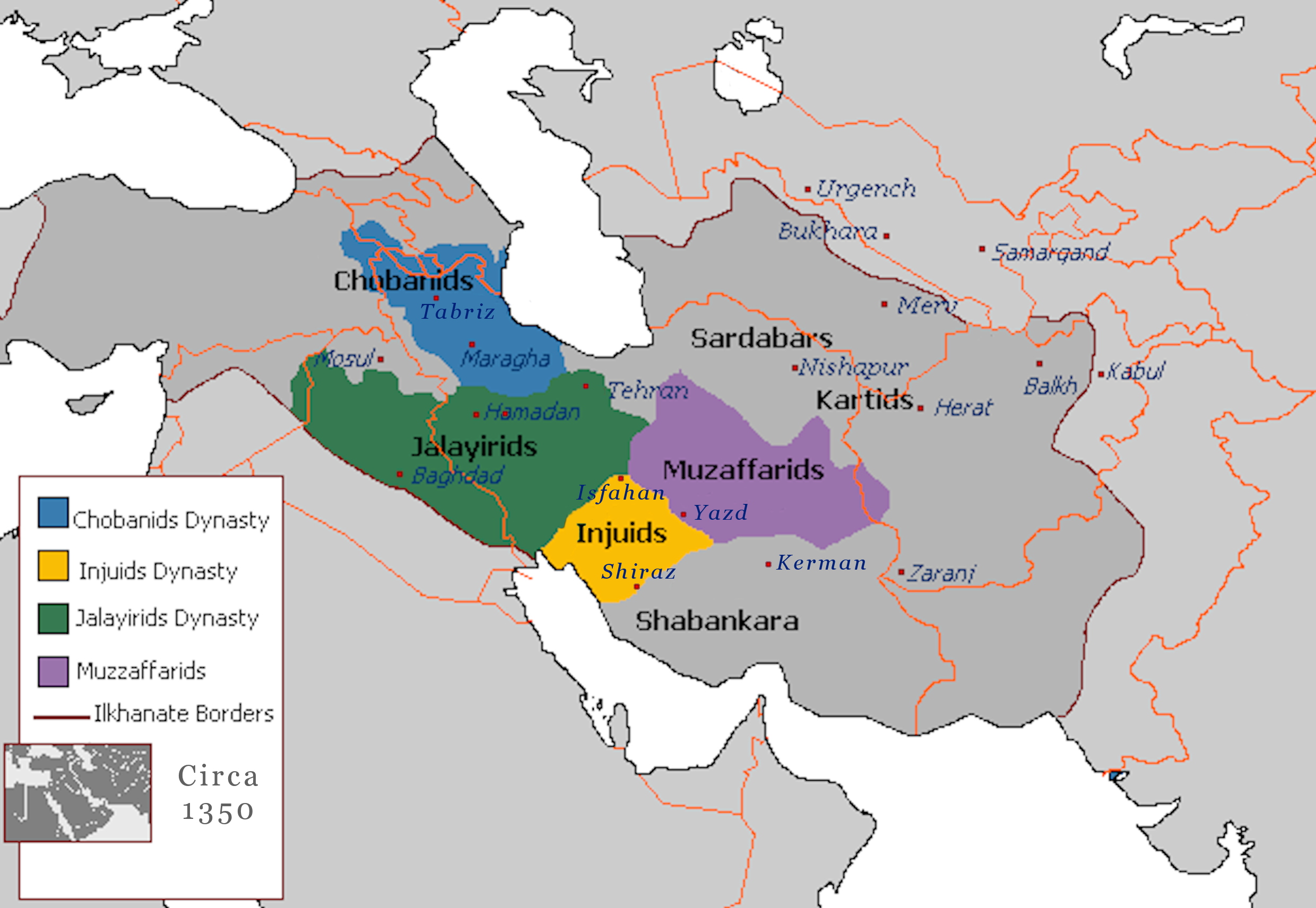
- A map depicting the states succeeding the Ilkhanate with the Jalayirids, Muzaffarids, Injuids and Chobanids represented.
Location	Sistan–Yazd
Result	Muzaffarid–Ilkhanate victory

Belligerents
Muzaffarid dynasty Ilkhanate	Nikudaris

Commanders and leaders
Mubariz al-Din (WIA); Abu Sa'id Bahadur Khan	Nawruz (executed); Naushirwan (DOW); Taman (executed); Gorbeh (executed)

Strength
60	300

Casualties and losses
Unknown	~50 killed
- He killed many of them and took others captive, until grief and mourning spread through every household of the Nikudaris. The remaining commanders and elders were captured and sent to the Ilkhanid throne together with the severed head of Nawruz

The tribes stand as a highly significant series of military confrontations in the southern and eastern provinces of Persia during the Ilkhanate period. These conflicts erupted following the rising influence of rebellious tribal factions in the Sistan region, which posed a direct and severe threat to trade routes and regional security. The ensuing events highlight a complex succession of military maneuvers and direct engagements between the regular forces of the governor of Yazd and battle hardened tribal groups.

== Background ==
In the 14th century, the Ilkhanate sought to assert its control and tighten its administrative grip over the increasingly turbulent provinces of Persia. Within this political and territorial context, Mubariz al-Din Muhammad was appointed governor of the city of Yazd by the Ilkhanid ruler Abu Sa'id. The most prominent challenge facing the young governor upon his appointment was the escalating rebellion of the Nikudaris, a militant tribal group concentrated primarily in the province of Sistan.

Exploiting the rugged geography and volatile political climate, the declared an open revolt against Ilkhanid authority. They initiated intense and coordinated raids, plundering trade caravans and severing key thoroughfares, which paralyzed economic activity and destabilized the broader region. The Nikudaris operated under the field command of their chieftain, Nawruz who successfully mobilized hundreds of fighters to impose his control. Conversely, Mubariz al-Din Muhammad's primary motivation was to prove his competence as the newly appointed governor, restore the sovereign prestige of the Ilkhanid state, and secure the vital commercial routes traversing his jurisdiction. This mutual escalation set the stage for an inevitable military clash between the provincial government forces and the rebellious tribal confederation.

== Campaign ==
The military campaign commenced with a bold tactical decision by Mubariz al-Din to confront the rebellion directly and proactively. Despite the enemy's significant numerical superiority, Mubariz al-Din marched at the head of a remarkably small strike force consisting of merely sixty cavalrymen, seeking to directly engage the Nikudaris chieftain Nawruz, who commanded a force of three hundred fighters.

The two sides clashed in a fierce and brutal military engagement. During the battle, Mubariz al-Din exhibited exceptional valor, fighting directly on the front lines against the tribal forces. His shield absorbed seventy arrows, he sustained wounds in two different locations, and two consecutive horses were killed beneath him due to the sheer intensity of the assault. At a critical juncture in the conflict, military reinforcements arrived to support the Yazd forces, shifting the balance of power on the battlefield. Mubariz al-Din's troops subsequently launched a decisive counterattack that broke the Nikudaris formations.

The battle rapidly evolved into a tactical pursuit Mubariz al-Din chased the retreating remnants as far as the region of Bafq. The conflict, however, did not end with this single engagement. Driven by a desire to avenge their fallen leadership, the Nikudaris later rallied their ranks and advanced in a direct military march toward the city of Yazd. Mubariz al-Din confronted them once more with a force smaller than theirs and succeeded in repelling their advance. The series of hit and run battles, sieges and skirmishes between the two sides persisted for an extended period, with Yazd forces fighting approximately twenty to twenty one distinct battles against the Nikudaris in a theater of operations that spanned several years.

== Aftermath ==
The decisive initial confrontations resulted in the death of the Nikudaris chieftain, Nawruz, as well as the capture of another prominent tribal commander. Mubariz al-Din ordered the captive commander to be sent in an iron cage, with Nawruz severed head suspended around his neck, to the Ilkhanid royal court associated with Öljaitü and Abu Sa'id as physical proof of the rebellion's suppression and a grisly affirmation of his loyalty. These military defeats inflicted a devastating psychological and social impact on the Nikudaris historical accounts note that wailing and mourning enveloped their homes in Sistan. Although the tribes continued a fragmented resistance that lasted between thirteen and fourteen years, they were ultimately subjected to complete submission.

On a political and administrative level, Mubariz al-Din Muhammad's status was immensely elevated. His military successes culminated in the expansion of his diplomatic and political influence.
