= Tang-e Bastak =

Tang-e Bastak تنگ بستك
- Village
- Location within Iran
- Coordinates: 27°16′00″N 54°27′00″E
- Country: Iran
- Province: Hormozgan
- County: Bastak
- Bakhsh: Central
- Rural District: Fatuyeh

Population (2006)
  - Total: 66
- Time zone: UTC+3:30 (IRST)
  - Summer (DST): UTC+4:30 (IRDT)

Tang-e Bastak (Persian: تنگ بستك, also Romanized as Tang-i-Bastak; also known as Gardaneh-ye Bastak) is a village in Fatuyeh Rural District, in the Central District of Bastak County, Hormozgan Province, Iran. At the 2006 census, its population was 66, in 13 families.
