= Zangard, Hormozgan =

Village in Hormozgan province, Iran

Zangard Persian: زنگارد
- Village
- Location within Iran
- Coordinates: 27°13′13″N 54°36′48″E
- Country: Iran
- Province: Hormozgan
- County: Bastak
- District: Central
- Rural District: Godeh

Population (2016)
  - Total: 2,635
- Time zone: UTC+3:30 (IRST)

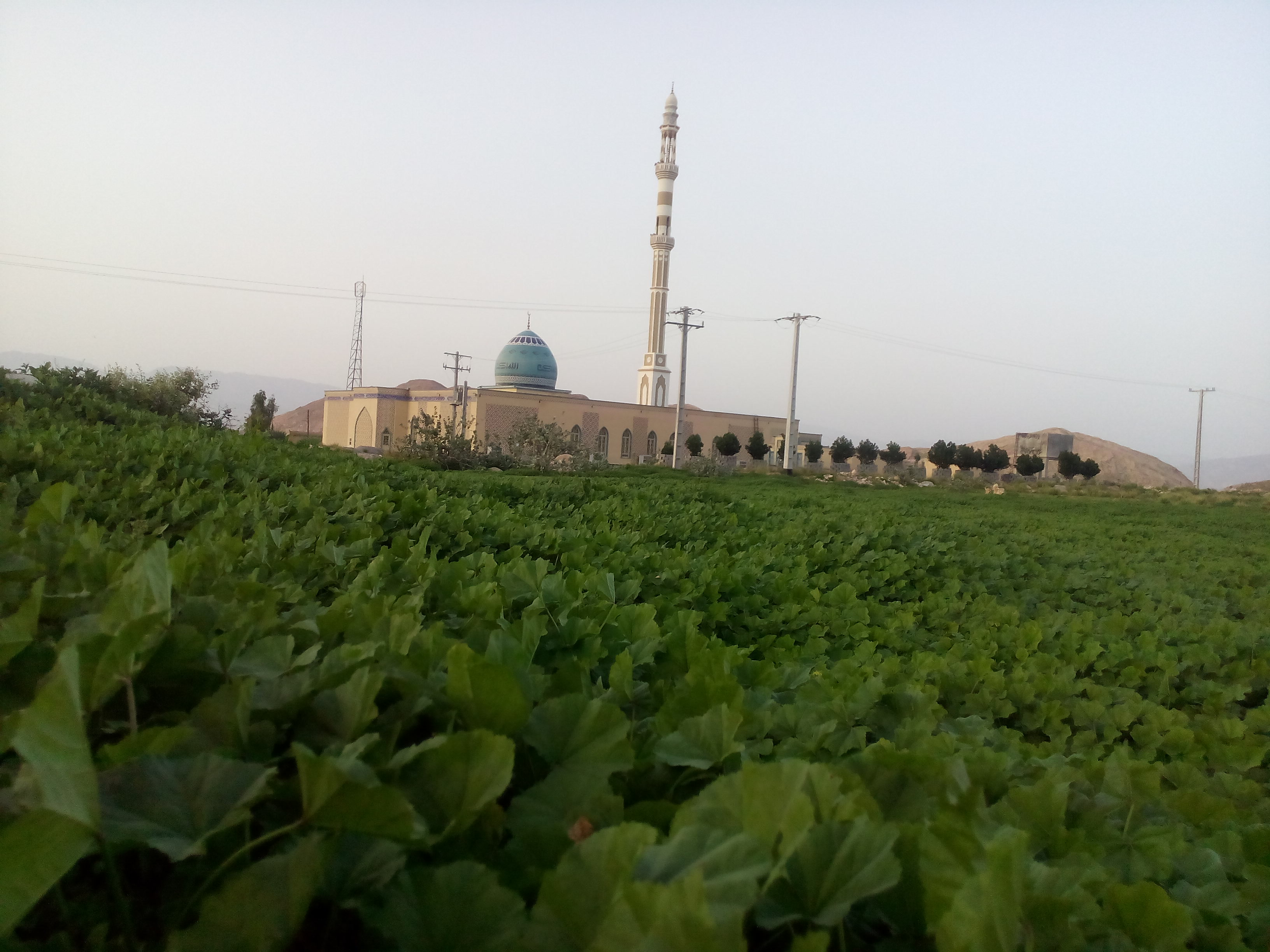
The Grand Mosque in Zangard

Zangard (Persian: زنگارد) (Note: Also romanized as Zangārd; also known as Zankard) is a village in Godeh Rural District of the Central District of Bastak County, Hormozgan province, Iran.

== Demographics ==
=== Population ===
At the time of the 2006 National Census, the village's population was 2,080 in 403 households. The following census in 2011 counted 2,556 people in 664 households. The 2016 census measured the population of the village as 2,635 people in 730 households. It was the most populous village in its rural district.
