= Muzaffar Ahmed =

Muzaffar Ahmed may refer to:

- Muzaffar Ahmed (politician) (1889–1973), Indian Bengali politician, journalist and communist activist
- Muzaffar Ahmed (economist) (1936–2012), Bangladeshi economist
- Muzaffar Ahmed (NAP politician) (1922–2019), advisor in Provisional Government of Bangladesh during wartime in 1971
