= Muzaffargarh (disambiguation) =

Muzaffargarh is a city in Punjab, Pakistan.

Muzaffargarh may also refer to:

- Muzaffargarh District, a district of Punjab, Pakistan
- Muzaffargarh Tehsil, a tehsil of district Muzaffargarh
- Muzaffargarh railway station, a railway station in Pakistan

== See also ==
- Muzaffarabad (disambiguation)
- Muzaffarpur, in Bihar, India
