= Seyyed Ahmadi, Hormozgan =

Seyyed Ahmadi سيداحمدي
- Village
- Location within Iran
- Coordinates: 27°14′12″N 54°49′50″E
- Country: Iran
- Province: Hormozgan
- County: Bastak
- Bakhsh: Central
- Rural District: Deh Tall

Population (2006)
  - Total: 154
- Time zone: UTC+3:30 (IRST)
  - Summer (DST): UTC+4:30 (IRDT)

Seyyed Ahmadi (Persian: سيداحمدي, also Romanized as Seyyed Aḩmadī; also known as Seyyed Aḩmad) is a village in Deh Tall Rural District, in the Central District of Bastak County, Hormozgan Province, Iran. At the 2006 census, its population was 154, in 36 families.
