= Levar =

LeVar or Levar may refer to:

== People ==
=== Given name ===
- LeVar Burton (born 1957), American actor, presenter, director and author
- Levar Fisher (born 1979), American football linebacker
- Levar Harper-Griffith (born 1981), American professional tennis player
- Levar Stoney (born 1981), American politician and mayor of Richmond, Virginia
- LeVar Woods (born 1978), American football coach at the University of Iowa
- Percy Levar Walton (born 1978), American convicted of three murders

=== Surname ===
- Milan Levar (c. 1954–2000), Croatian whistleblower
- Patrick Levar (born c. 1951), former alderman of the 45th ward of Chicago

== See also ==
- Lavar (disambiguation)
- Lever (disambiguation)
