= Mozaffarabad, Khorrambid =

Village in Fars province, Iran

Mozaffarabad Persian: مظفرآباد
- Village
- Location within Iran
- Coordinates: 30°25′45″N 53°19′15″E
- Country: Iran
- Province: Fars
- County: Khorrambid
- District: Mashhad-e Morghab
- Rural District: Shahidabad

Population (2016)
  - Total: 1,097
- Time zone: UTC+3:30 (IRST)

Mozaffarabad (Persian: مظفرآباد) (Note: Also romanized as Moz̧affarābād; also known as Moz̧affarābād Aḩmadī and Muzaffari) is a village in Shahidabad Rural District of Mashhad-e Morghab District, Khorrambid County, Fars province, Iran.

== Demographics ==
=== Population ===
At the time of the 2006 National Census, the village's population was 929 in 221 households. The following census in 2011 counted 955 people in 265 households. The 2016 census measured the population of the village as 1,097 people in 321 households. It was the most populous village in its rural district.
