= Dehtal, Hormozgan =

Village in Hormozgan province, Iran

Dehtal Persian: دهتل
- Village
- Location within Iran
- Coordinates: 27°12′44″N 54°47′01″E
- Country: Iran
- Province: Hormozgan
- County: Bastak
- District: Central
- Rural District: Dehtal

Population (2016)
  - Total: 1,702
- Time zone: UTC+3:30 (IRST)

Dehtal (Persian: ده تل) (Note: Also romanized as Deh Tal, Deh Tall and Deh-e Tall) is a village in, and the capital of, Dehtal Rural District of the Central District of Bastak County, Hormozgan province, Iran.

== Demographics ==
=== Population ===
At the time of the 2006 National Census, the village's population was 1,425 in 293 households. The following census in 2011 counted 2,071 people in 476 households. The 2016 census measured the population of the village as 1,702 people in 462 households. It was the most populous village in its rural district.
