= Qaderabad =

City in Fars province, Iran

Qaderabad Persian: قادراباد
- City
- Location within Iran
- Coordinates: 30°16′39″N 53°15′58″E
- Country: Iran
- Province: Fars
- County: Khorrambid
- District: Mashhad-e Morghab

Population (2016)
  - Total: 14,973
- Time zone: UTC+3:30 (IRST)

Qaderabad (Persian: قادراباد) (Note: Also romanized as Qāderābād and Qādirābād) is a city in, and the capital of, Mashhad-e Morghab District of Khorrambid County, Fars province, Iran.

== Demographics ==
=== Population ===
At the time of the 2006 National Census, the city's population was 14,095 in 3,375 households. The following census in 2011 counted 15,792 people in 4,234 households. The 2016 census measured the population of the city as 14,973 people in 4,480 households.
