= Deh-e Tol, Kohgiluyeh and Boyer-Ahmad =

Deh-e Tol ده تل
- Village
- Location within Iran
- Coordinates: 31°01′04″N 50°28′40″E
- Country: Iran
- Province: Kohgiluyeh and Boyer-Ahmad
- County: Kohgiluyeh
- Bakhsh: Dishmok
- Rural District: Bahmayi-ye Sarhadi-ye Gharbi

Population (2006)
  - Total: 363
- Time zone: UTC+3:30 (IRST)
  - Summer (DST): UTC+4:30 (IRDT)

Deh-e Tol (Persian: ده تل, also Romanized as Dehtal; also known as Darreh Tol) is a village in Bahmayi-ye Sarhadi-ye Gharbi Rural District, Dishmok District, Kohgiluyeh County, Kohgiluyeh and Boyer-Ahmad Province, Iran. At the 2006 census, its population was 363, in 65 families.
