= Qanat-e Now, Esmaili =

Qanat-e Now قناتنو
- Village
- Location within Iran
- Coordinates: 28°16′53″N 57°41′53″E
- Country: Iran
- Province: Kerman
- County: Anbarabad
- Bakhsh: Esmaili
- Rural District: Ganjabad

Population (2006)
  - Total: 289
- Time zone: UTC+3:30 (IRST)
  - Summer (DST): UTC+4:30 (IRDT)

Qanat-e Now (Persian: قناتنو, also Romanized as Qanāt-e Now; also known as Kalāt Now) is a village in Ganjabad Rural District, Esmaili District, Anbarabad County, Kerman Province, Iran. At the 2006 census, its population was 289, in 52 families.
