= Mozaffarabad, Kazerun =

Mozaffarabad مظفرآباد
- Village
- Location within Iran
- Coordinates: 29°53′10″N 51°35′13″E
- Country: Iran
- Province: Fars
- County: Kazerun
- Bakhsh: Chenar Shahijan
- Rural District: Somghan

Population (2006)
  - Total: 309
- Time zone: UTC+3:30 (IRST)
  - Summer (DST): UTC+4:30 (IRDT)

Mozaffarabad (Persian: مظفرآباد, also Romanized as Moz̧affarābād) is a village in Somghan Rural District, Chenar Shahijan District, Kazerun County, Fars province, Iran. At the 2006 census, its population was 309, in 74 families.
