= Anarak-e Sofla =

Anarak-e Sofla انارك سفلي
- Village
- Location within Iran
- Coordinates: 33°51′16″N 47°14′43″E
- Country: Iran
- Province: Kermanshah
- County: Kermanshah
- Bakhsh: Firuzabad
- Rural District: Osmanvand

Population (2006)
  - Total: 39
- Time zone: UTC+3:30 (IRST)
  - Summer (DST): UTC+4:30 (IRDT)

Anarak-e Sofla (Persian: انارك سفلي, also Romanized as Anārak-e Soflá; also known as Anārak and Anārak-e Avval) is a village in Osmanvand Rural District, Firuzabad District, Kermanshah County, Kermanshah Province, Iran. At the 2006 census, its population was 39, in 9 families.
