= Anarak-e Olya =

Anarak-e Olya انارك عليا
- Village
- Location within Iran
- Coordinates: 33°50′55″N 47°15′34″E
- Country: Iran
- Province: Kermanshah
- County: Kermanshah
- Bakhsh: Firuzabad
- Rural District: Osmanvand

Population (2006)
  - Total: 101
- Time zone: UTC+3:30 (IRST)
  - Summer (DST): UTC+4:30 (IRDT)

Anarak-e Olya (Persian: انارك عليا, also Romanized as Anārak-e ‘Olyā; also known as Anārak and Anārak-e Sevvom) is a village in Osmanvand Rural District, Firuzabad District, Kermanshah County, Kermanshah Province, Iran. At the 2006 census, its population was 101, in 23 families.
