= Naveh, Kurdistan =

Naveh ناوه
- Village
- Location within Iran
- Coordinates: 35°53′50″N 45°53′27″E
- Country: Iran
- Province: Kurdistan
- County: Baneh
- Bakhsh: Nanur
- Rural District: Buin

Population (2006)
  - Total: 196
- Time zone: UTC+3:30 (IRST)
  - Summer (DST): UTC+4:30 (IRDT)

Naveh (Persian: ناوه, also Romanized as Nāveh) is a village in Buin Rural District, Nanur District, Baneh County, Kurdistan Province, Iran. As of the 2006 census, its population was 196. The village is populated by Kurds.
