= Lavar-e Gol =

Lavar-e Gol لاورگل
- Village
- Location within Iran
- Coordinates: 27°37′57″N 52°32′18″E
- Country: Iran
- Province: Bushehr
- County: Jam
- Bakhsh: Central
- Rural District: Jam

Population (2006)
  - Total: 237
- Time zone: UTC+3:30 (IRST)
  - Summer (DST): UTC+4:30 (IRDT)

Lavar-e Gol (Persian: لاورگل, also Romanized as Lāvar-e Gol and Lāvar Gol) is a village in Jam Rural District, in the Central District of Jam County, Bushehr Province, Iran. At the 2006 census, its population was 237, in 40 families.
