= Gardaneh-ye Poshtkuh =

Gardaneh-ye Poshtkuh گردنه پشتكوه
- village
- Location within Iran
- Coordinates: 27°37′58″N 56°48′51″E
- Country: Iran
- Province: Hormozgan
- County: Bandar Abbas
- Bakhsh: shamil
- Rural District: Shamil

Population (2006)
  - Total: 215
- Time zone: UTC+3:30 (IRST)
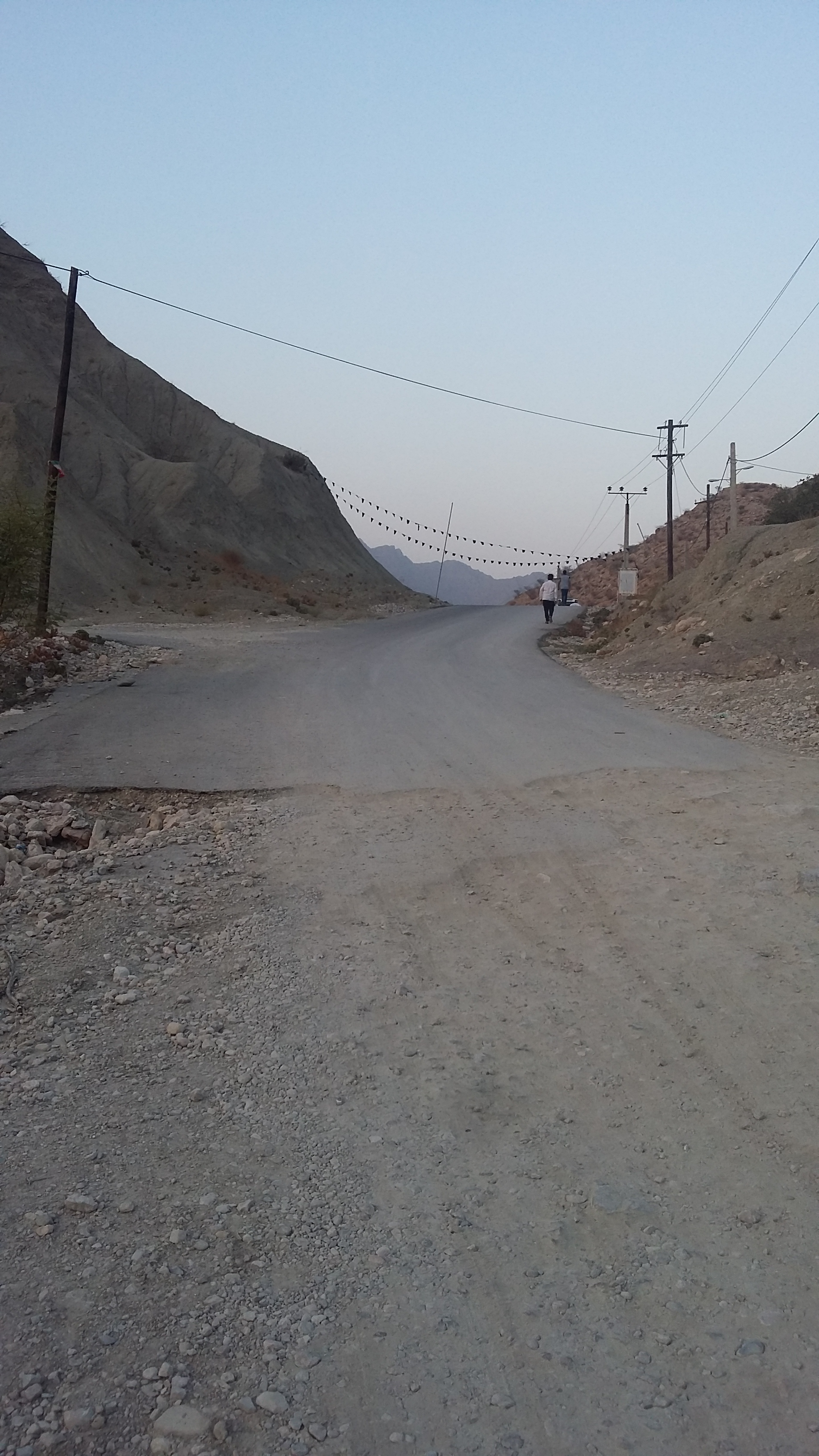

Gardaneh-ye Poshtkuh (Persian: گردنه پشتكوه, also Romanized as Gardaneh-ye Poshtkūh; also known as Gardaneh) is a village in Poshtkuh-e Shamil, Shamil Rural District, Bandar Abbas County, Hormozgan Province, Iran. At the 2006 census, its population was 215, in 51 families.
