= Moallem Khani-ye Bala =

Moallem Khani-ye Bala معلم خاني بالا
- Village
- Location within Iran
- Coordinates: 36°29′44″N 49°50′16″E
- Country: Iran
- Province: Qazvin
- County: Qazvin
- Bakhsh: Kuhin
- Rural District: Ilat-e Qaqazan-e Sharqi

Population (2006)
  - Total: 22
- Time zone: UTC+3:30 (IRST)
  - Summer (DST): UTC+4:30 (IRDT)

Moallem Khani-ye Bala (Persian: معلم خاني بالا, also Romanized as Mo‘allem Khānī-ye Bālā; also known as Gardaneh-ye Mo‘allem Khānī) is a village in Ilat-e Qaqazan-e Sharqi Rural District, Kuhin District, Qazvin County, Qazvin Province, Iran. At the 2006 census, its population was 22, in 7 families.
