= Muzaffarids =

Muzaffarids or Muzaffarid dynasty may refer to:

- Muzaffarids (Iran), rulers of parts of central and southwestern Iran from 1335 to 1393
- Muzaffarids (Gujarat), rulers of the Sultanate of Gujarat in India from 1391 to 1583
- Muzaffarids (Somalia), rulers of Mogadishu from c. 1500 to c. 1624

== See also ==
- Mozaffari (disambiguation)
- Muzaffar (disambiguation)
