= Godar-e Arbu =

Godar-e Arbu گدارعربو
- Village
- Location within Iran
- Coordinates: 28°08′24″N 56°47′15″E
- Country: Iran
- Province: Hormozgan
- County: Hajjiabad
- Bakhsh: Ahmadi
- Rural District: Kuh Shah

Population (2006)
  - Total: 150
- Time zone: UTC+3:30 (IRST)
  - Summer (DST): UTC+4:30 (IRDT)

Godar-e Arbu (Persian: گدارعربو, also Romanized as Godār-e ‘Arbū; also known as Gardaneh-ye Godār ‘Arbū) is a village in Kuh Shah Rural District, Ahmadi District, Hajjiabad County, Hormozgan Province, Iran. At the 2006 census, its population was 150, in 40 families.
