= Anarak-e Barmeyun =

Anarak-e Barmeyun انارك برميون
- Village
- Location within Iran
- Coordinates: 31°06′05″N 50°39′09″E
- Country: Iran
- Province: Kohgiluyeh and Boyer-Ahmad
- County: Boyer-Ahmad
- Bakhsh: Ludab
- Rural District: Ludab

Population (2006)
  - Total: 259
- Time zone: UTC+3:30 (IRST)
  - Summer (DST): UTC+4:30 (IRDT)

Anarak-e Barmeyun (Persian: انارك برميون, also Romanized as Anārak-e Barmeyūn; also known as Anārak) is a village in Ludab Rural District, Ludab District, Boyer-Ahmad County, Kohgiluyeh and Boyer-Ahmad Province, Iran. At the 2006 census, its population was 259, in 50 families.
