= Mozaffari, Kohgiluyeh and Boyer-Ahmad =

Mozaffari مظفری
- Village
- Location within Iran
- Coordinates: 31°01′25″N 51°15′20″E
- Country: Iran
- Province: Kohgiluyeh and Boyer-Ahmad
- County: Dana
- Bakhsh: Pataveh
- Rural District: Pataveh

Population (2006)
  - Total: 75
- Time zone: UTC+3:30 (IRST)
  - Summer (DST): UTC+4:30 (IRDT)

Mozaffari (Persian: مظفری, also Romanized as Moz̧affarī) is a village in Pataveh Rural District, Pataveh District, Dana County, Kohgiluyeh and Boyer-Ahmad Province, Iran. At the 2006 census, its population was 75, in 15 families.
