= Gardaneh-ye Kol Hasank =

Gardaneh-ye Kol Hasank گردنه كل حسنك
- Village
- Country: Iran
- Province: Fars
- County: Rostam
- Bakhsh: Central
- Rural District: Rostam-e Yek

Population (2006)
  - Total: 37
- Time zone: UTC+3:30 (IRST)
  - Summer (DST): UTC+4:30 (IRDT)

Gardaneh-ye Kol Hasank (Persian: گردنه كل حسنك, also Romanized as Gardaneh-ye Kol Ḩasank) is a village in Rostam-e Yek Rural District, in the Central District of Rostam County, Fars province, Iran. At the 2006 census, its population was 37, in 7 families.
