= Muzaffarabad chalo =

Muzaffarabad chalo (lit. 'Go to Muzaffarabad') refers to a call that was given by a co-ordination committee (a conglomerate of both factions of Hurriyat composed of Hurriyat (M) and Hurriyat (G), Jammu and Kashmir Liberation Front, Kashmir Bar Association and Kashmir Traders Federation) on 11 August 2008 when the people of Jammu and Kashmir, India were appealed to march to Muzaffarabad, the capital of Azad Kashmir in Pakistan, in retaliation to the economic blockade of the Kashmir valley sources following the Amarnath land transfer controversy. The Separatist leader, Mirwaiz, was put on house arrest by the Indian administration to prevent unrest in the valley.

On 11 August 2008, a huge population of Indian Kashmir was leading towards Muzaffarabad through Srinagar – Muzaffarabad National Highway via Baramulla. The procession was a result of a call by the Chairman All Parties Hurriyat Conference, Syed Ali Shah Geelani. 2008 was a critical year for Kashmir, Amarnath Land Issue arose the level of unrest and agitation in the valley. The people – men, women, children and old from all the parts of valley – were marching towards the line of control (LOC) via the national highway. The procession was led by Shabir Shah and Sheikh Abdul Aziz. The procession of 100,000 people was blocked at Chahlah Nowshera, a place about 50 km before the LOC, by police and CRPF but the forces couldn't control the huge crowd and thus opened fire. In the firing, leader Sheikh Aziz and four other people were killed. The procession was blocked and people turned back but the killings acted as fuel to the fire and contributed to due unrest in the Kashmir valley.
