= Kuhij =

City in Hormozgan province, Iran

Kuhij Persian: کوهیج
- City
- Location within Iran
- Coordinates: 27°11′20″N 54°09′38″E
- Country: Iran
- Province: Hormozgan
- County: Bastak
- District: Central

Population (2016)
  - Total: 3,597
- Time zone: UTC+3:30 (IRST)

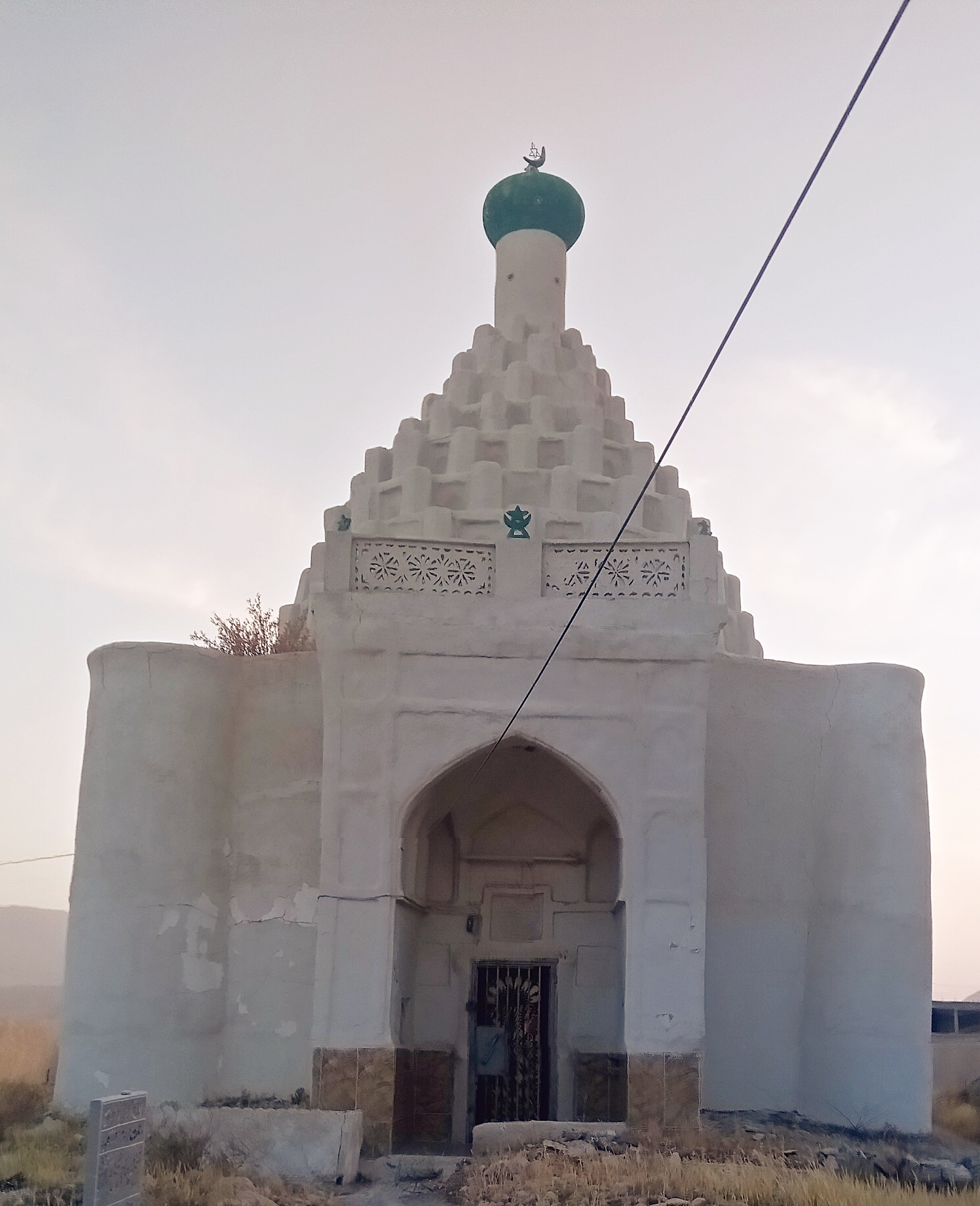
Tomb of Sheikh Hassan Aali, Kuhij

Kuhij (Persian: کوهیج) (Note: Also romanized as Kūhīj and Kuhīj; also known as Koohaj, Koohej, Kohaj, Kūhech, Kūhej, and Kuhi) is a city in the Central District of Bastak County, Hormozgan province, Iran.

== Demographics ==
=== Population ===
At the time of the 2006 National Census, Kuhij's population was 2,728 in 526 households, when it was a village in Jenah Rural District of Jenah District. The following census in 2011 counted 3,900 people in 853 households. The 2016 census measured the population of the village as 3,597 people in 917 households, by which time it had been transferred to Fatuyeh Rural District of the Central District. It was the most populous village in its rural district.

After the census, the village of Kutij was elevated to the status of a city.
