= Aq Cheshmeh, North Khorasan =

Aq Cheshmeh اق چشمه
- Village
- Location within Iran
- Coordinates: 36°59′27″N 58°04′22″E
- Country: Iran
- Province: North Khorasan
- County: Faruj
- Bakhsh: Central
- Rural District: Sangar

Population (2006)
  - Total: 156
- Time zone: UTC+3:30 (IRST)
  - Summer (DST): UTC+4:30 (IRDT)

Aq Cheshmeh (Persian: اق چشمه, also Romanized as Āq Cheshmeh) is a village in Sangar Rural District, in the Central District of Faruj County, North Khorasan Province, Iran. At the 2006 census, its population was 156, in 47 families.
