= Gardan Taq =

Gardan Taq گردن طاق
- Village
- Location within Iran
- Coordinates: 32°02′56″N 49°45′02″E
- Country: Iran
- Province: Khuzestan
- County: Izeh
- Bakhsh: Central
- Rural District: Pian

Population (2006)
  - Total: 444
- Time zone: UTC+3:30 (IRST)
  - Summer (DST): UTC+4:30 (IRDT)

Gardan Taq (Persian: گردن طاق, also Romanized as Gardan Ţāq; also known as Gardaneh Ţāqā and Takht-e Kāshān) is a village in Pian Rural District, in the Central District of Izeh County, Khuzestan Province, Iran. At the 2006 census, its population was 444, in 67 families.
