= Qaleh-ye Mirzai, Kazerun =

Qaleh-ye Mirzai قلعه ميرزايي
- Village
- Location within Iran
- Coordinates: 29°28′33″N 51°54′19″E
- Country: Iran
- Province: Fars
- County: Kazerun
- Bakhsh: Jereh and Baladeh
- Rural District: Famur

Population (2006)
  - Total: 62
- Time zone: UTC+3:30 (IRST)
  - Summer (DST): UTC+4:30 (IRDT)

Qaleh-ye Mirzai (Persian: قلعه ميرزايي, also Romanized as Qal‘eh-ye Mīrzā’ī; also known as Qal‘eh-ye Mīrzā) is a village in Famur Rural District, Jereh and Baladeh District, Kazerun County, Fars province, Iran. At the 2006 census, its population was 62, in 14 families.
