= Anarak, Ilam =

Anarak انارك
- Village
- Location within Iran
- Coordinates: 33°38′51″N 46°07′29″E
- Country: Iran
- Province: Ilam
- County: Ilam
- Bakhsh: Chavar
- Rural District: Arkavazi

Population (2006)
  - Total: 114
- Time zone: UTC+3:30 (IRST)
  - Summer (DST): UTC+4:30 (IRDT)
- Climate: Csa

Anarak (Persian: انارك, also Romanized as Anārak; also known as Qeyţūlī) is a village in Arkavazi Rural District, Chavar District, Ilam County, Ilam Province, Iran. At the 2006 census, its population was 114, in 22 families. The village is populated by Kurds.
