= Qanat-e Now, Anbarabad =

Qanat-e Now قناتنو
- Village
- Location within Iran
- Coordinates: 28°20′10″N 57°50′20″E
- Country: Iran
- Province: Kerman
- County: Anbarabad
- Bakhsh: Central
- Rural District: Jahadabad

Population (2006)
  - Total: 108
- Time zone: UTC+3:30 (IRST)
  - Summer (DST): UTC+4:30 (IRDT)

Qanat-e Now (Persian: قناتنو, also Romanized as Qanāt-e Now and Qanāt Now; also known as Mahtābī, Qanāt-e Now Pā’īn, Qanāt Now-e Pā’īn, and Qanāt Now Pā’īn) is a village in Jahadabad Rural District, in the Central District of Anbarabad County, Kerman Province, Iran. At the 2006 census, its population was 108, in 20 families.
