= Sala Lavardén =

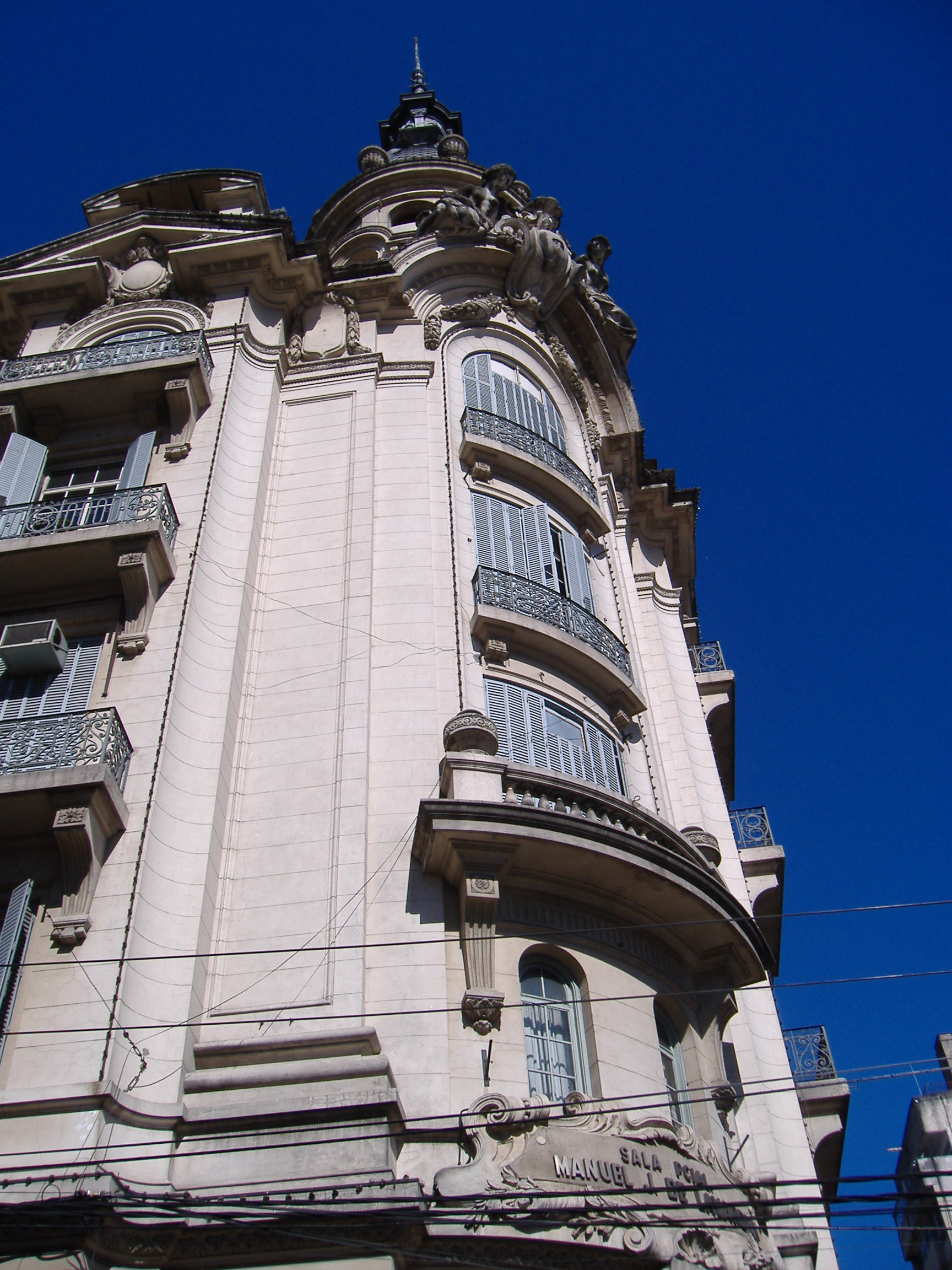
The upper floors of the Lavardén building.

The Sala Lavardén (Spanish, Lavardén Hall) is a theater in Rosario, province of Santa Fe, Argentina. It is formally called Teatro Provincial Manuel José de Lavardén and is part of the culture center of the same name, in turn administered by the provincial state.

At present the theater has a capacity for 400 attendants. It is hosted in a palace-like building on the corner of Mendoza St. and Sarmiento St. in downtown Rosario, which has an area of 1,242 square metres (13,370 sq ft) in six floors and two underground levels.

The building was started in 1925 as the seat of the Argentine Agrarian Federation, and inaugurated as such on 3 March 1927. The theater itself was opened on 23 June as a cinema (Cine La Federación). The effects of the Great Depression caused the Federation to be unable to pay the installments of the loan requested for the building, which was finally given over to the provincial state. In 1933 it was in turn ceded to the national Ministry of Agriculture and Animal Husbandry. The Ministry authorized the provincial state to use the theater room again in 1965 (it was being employed as a warehouse). It was then renamed after Manuel José de Lavardén, a renowned poet and scriptwriter.
