= Mozaffari, Kharameh =

Mozaffari مظفری
- Village
- Location within Iran
- Coordinates: 29°33′05″N 53°23′45″E
- Country: Iran
- Province: Fars
- County: Kharameh
- Bakhsh: Central
- Rural District: Sofla

Population (2006)
  - Total: 440
- Time zone: UTC+3:30 (IRST)
  - Summer (DST): UTC+4:30 (IRDT)

Mozaffari (Persian: مظفری, also Romanized as Moz̧affarī; also known as Muzaffari) is a village in Sofla Rural District, in the Central District of Kharameh County, Fars province, Iran. At the 2006 census, its population was 440, in 109 families.
