= Lavar, Kohgiluyeh and Boyer-Ahmad =

Lavar لاور
- Village
- Country: Iran
- Province: Kohgiluyeh and Boyer-Ahmad
- County: Charam
- Bakhsh: Central
- Rural District: Charam

Population (2006)
  - Total: 40
- Time zone: UTC+3:30 (IRST)
  - Summer (DST): UTC+4:30 (IRDT)

Lavar (Persian: لاور, also Romanized as Lāvar) is a village in Charam Rural District, in the Central District of Charam County, Kohgiluyeh and Boyer-Ahmad Province, Iran. At the 2006 census, its population was 40, in 6 families.
