= Mozaffarabad, Kohgiluyeh and Boyer-Ahmad =

Mozaffarabad مظفرآباد
- Village
- Location within Iran
- Coordinates: 30°25′23″N 50°31′35″E
- Country: Iran
- Province: Kohgiluyeh and Boyer-Ahmad
- County: Gachsaran
- Bakhsh: Central
- Rural District: Lishtar

Population (2006)
  - Total: 559
- Time zone: UTC+3:30 (IRST)
  - Summer (DST): UTC+4:30 (IRDT)

Mozaffarabad (Persian: مظفرآباد, also Romanized as Moz̧affarābād) is a village in Lishtar Rural District, in the Central District of Gachsaran County, Kohgiluyeh and Boyer-Ahmad Province, Iran. At the 2006 census, its population was 559, in 114 families.
