= Mozaffarabad, Kerman =

Mozaffarabad مظفرآباد
- Village
- Location within Iran
- Coordinates: 29°38′29″N 57°24′35″E
- Country: Iran
- Province: Kerman
- County: Kerman
- Bakhsh: Rayen
- Rural District: Rayen

Population (2006)
  - Total: 71
- Time zone: UTC+3:30 (IRST)
  - Summer (DST): UTC+4:30 (IRDT)

Mozaffarabad (Persian: مظفرآباد, also Romanized as Moz̧affarābād; also known as Moz̧affarābād-e Rāyen and Muzaffarābād) is a village in Rayen Rural District, Rayen District, Kerman County, Kerman Province, Iran. At the 2006 census, its population was 71, in 21 families.
