= Anarak-e Pain =

Anarak-e Pain انارك پايين
- Village
- Location within Iran
- Coordinates: 28°24′58″N 58°34′12″E
- Country: Iran
- Province: Kerman
- County: Rigan
- Bakhsh: Central
- Rural District: Gavkan

Population (2006)
  - Total: 246
- Time zone: UTC+3:30 (IRST)
  - Summer (DST): UTC+4:30 (IRDT)

Anarak-e Pain (Persian: انارك پايين, also Romanized as Anārak-e Pā’īn; also known as Anārak) is a village in Gavkan Rural District, in the Central District of Rigan County, Kerman Province, Iran. At the 2006 census, its population was 246, in 40 families.
