= Qanat-e Now, Jiroft =

Qanat-e Now قنات نو
- Village
- Location within Iran
- Coordinates: 28°45′36″N 57°09′15″E
- Country: Iran
- Province: Kerman
- County: Jiroft
- Bakhsh: Central
- Rural District: Esfandaqeh

Population (2006)
  - Total: 86
- Time zone: UTC+3:30 (IRST)
  - Summer (DST): UTC+4:30 (IRDT)

Qanat-e Now (Persian: قنات نو, also Romanized as Qanāt-e Now and Qanāt Now; also known as Ghanat Now) is a village in Esfandaqeh Rural District, in the Central District of Jiroft County, Kerman Province, Iran. At the 2006 census, its population was 86, in 16 families.
