= Meshkan, Baft =

Meshkan مشكان
- Village
- Location within Iran
- Coordinates: 29°22′20″N 56°37′40″E
- Country: Iran
- Province: Kerman
- County: Baft
- Bakhsh: Central
- Rural District: Kiskan

Population (2006)
  - Total: 174
- Time zone: UTC+3:30 (IRST)
  - Summer (DST): UTC+4:30 (IRDT)

Meshkan (Persian: مشكان, also Romanized as Meshkān; also known as Moshgān) is a village in Kiskan Rural District, in the Central District of Baft County, Kerman Province, Iran. At the 2006 census, its population was 174, in 54 families.
