= Anarak-e Bala =

Anarak-e Bala انارك بالا
- Village
- Location within Iran
- Coordinates: 28°24′55″N 58°34′40″E
- Country: Iran
- Province: Kerman
- County: Rigan
- Bakhsh: Central
- Rural District: Gavkan

Population (2006)
  - Total: 50
- Time zone: UTC+3:30 (IRST)
  - Summer (DST): UTC+4:30 (IRDT)

Anarak-e Bala (Persian: انارك بالا, also Romanized as Anārak-e Bālā; also known as Anārak) is a village in Gavkan Rural District, in the Central District of Rigan County, Kerman Province, Iran. At the 2006 census, its population was 50, in 9 families.
