= Meshkan Rural District =

Meshkan Rural District (Persian: دهستان مشکان) may refer to:

- Meshkan Rural District (Fars Province)
- Meshkan Rural District (Razavi Khorasan Province)
