= Jenjan-e Markazi =

Jenjan-e Markazi جنجان مركزي
- Village
- Location within Iran
- Coordinates: 30°12′36″N 51°28′48″E
- Country: Iran
- Province: Fars
- County: Mamasani
- Bakhsh: Central
- Rural District: Fahlian

Population (2006)
  - Total: 193
- Time zone: UTC+3:30 (IRST)
  - Summer (DST): UTC+4:30 (IRDT)

Jenjan-e Markazi (Persian: جنجان مركزي, also Romanized as Jenjān-e Markazī; also known as Jenjan) is a village in Fahlian Rural District, in the Central District of Mamasani County, Fars province, Iran. At the 2006 census, its population was 193, in 47 families.
