= Saint-Merd =

Saint-Merd may refer to several places in central France:

- Saint-Merd-la-Breuille
- Saint-Merd-de-Lapleau
- Saint-Merd-les-Oussines
