= Lavar, Gilan =

Lavar لوار
- Village
- Location within Iran
- Coordinates: 36°49′15″N 49°51′16″E
- Country: Iran
- Province: Gilan
- County: Siahkal
- Bakhsh: Deylaman
- Rural District: Deylaman

Population (2016)
  - Total: 18
- Time zone: UTC+3:30 (IRST)

Lavar (Persian: لوار, also Romanized as Lāvār; also known as Lāvār Kesh) is a village in Deylaman Rural District, Deylaman District, Siahkal County, Gilan Province, Iran. At the 2016 census, its population was 18, in 7 families. Up from 14 in 2006.
