= Deh Tall, Manj =

Village in Chaharmahal and Bakhtiari, Iran

Deh Tall ده تل
- Village
- Location within Iran
- Coordinates: 31°26′39″N 50°34′04″E
- Country: Iran
- Province: Chaharmahal and Bakhtiari
- County: Lordegan
- Bakhsh: Manj
- Rural District: Barez

Population (2006)
  - Total: 353
- Time zone: UTC+3:30 (IRST)
  - Summer (DST): UTC+4:30 (IRDT)

Deh Tall (Persian: ده تل, also Romanized as Deh Tol) is a village in Barez Rural District, Manj District, Lordegan County, Chaharmahal and Bakhtiari Province, Iran. At the 2006 census, its population was 353, in 69 families.
