= Muzaffar Hussain =

Muzaffar Hussain may mean the following:

- Fidai Khan Koka (real name Muzaffar Hussain), Mughal Governor of Lahore and Awadh
- Muzaffar Hussain Baig, former deputy chief minister of Indian state of Jammu and Kashmir
- Muzaffar Hussain Shah, Pakistani politician
- Mulla Muzaffar Hussain Kashani, Iranian philosopher and poet
- Muzaffer Hussain, Indian writer, journalist and columnist
- Muzaffar Husayn Mirza, Sultan of Herat
