= Muzaffarabad (disambiguation) =

Muzaffarabad is the capital city of Azad Jammu and Kashmir, Pakistan.

Muzaffarabad may also refer to:

Muzaffarabad

- Muzaffarabad District
- Muzaffarabad Airport
- Muzaffarabad Fort
- Battle of Muzaffarabad, during the Indo-Pakistani war of 1947–1948
- Muzaffarabad chalo, protest march towards Muzaffarabad in Jammu and Kashmir, India

Others

- Muzaffarabad, a village in Patiya Upazila, Chittagong District, Bangladesh; site of the Muzaffarabad massacre during the 1971 Bangladesh genocide
- Muzaffarabad (Assembly constituency), a former constituency of the Uttar Pradesh Legislative Assembly, India

== See also ==
- Mozaffarabad (disambiguation), places in Iran
- Muzaffargarh, in Punjab, Pakistan
- Muzaffarpur, in Bihar, India
