= Lavar, Bandar Abbas =

Lavar لاور
- Village
- Location within Iran
- Coordinates: 27°33′57″N 55°56′20″E
- Country: Iran
- Province: Hormozgan
- County: Bandar Abbas
- Bakhsh: Fin
- Rural District: Fin

Population (2006)
  - Total: 1,033
- Time zone: UTC+3:30 (IRST)
  - Summer (DST): UTC+4:30 (IRDT)

Lavar (Persian: لاور, also Romanized as Lāvar) is a village in Fin Rural District, Fin District, Bandar Abbas County, Hormozgan Province, Iran. At the 2006 census, its population was 1,033, in 205 families.
