= Mozaffarabad, Sabzevar =

Mozaffarabad مظفرآباد
- Village
- Location within Iran
- Coordinates: 35°48′11″N 57°33′15″E
- Country: Iran
- Province: Razavi Khorasan
- County: Sabzevar
- Bakhsh: Rud Ab
- Rural District: Khavashod

Population (2006)
  - Total: 83
- Time zone: UTC+3:30 (IRST)
  - Summer (DST): UTC+4:30 (IRDT)

Mozaffarabad (Persian: مظفرآباد, also Romanized as Moz̧affarābād) is a village in Khavashod Rural District, Rud Ab District, Sabzevar County, Razavi Khorasan Province, Iran. At the 2006 census, its population was 83, in 29 families.
