= Mozaffarabad, Kurdistan =

Mozaffarabad مظفرآباد
- Village
- Location within Iran
- Coordinates: 35°13′34″N 47°46′39″E
- Country: Iran
- Province: Kurdistan
- County: Qorveh
- Bakhsh: Serishabad
- Rural District: Qaslan

Population (2006)
  - Total: 435
- Time zone: UTC+3:30 (IRST)
  - Summer (DST): UTC+4:30 (IRDT)

Mozaffarabad (Persian: مظفرآباد, also Romanized as Moz̧affarābād) is a village in Qaslan Rural District, Serishabad District, Qorveh County, Kurdistan Province, Iran. At the 2006 census, its population was 435, in 110 families. The village is populated by Kurds.
