= Safashahr =

City in Fars province, Iran

Safashahr Persian: صفاشهر
- City
- Location within Iran
- Coordinates: 30°36′48″N 53°11′34″E
- Country: Iran
- Province: Fars
- County: Khorrambid
- District: Central

Population (2016)
  - Total: 26,933
- Time zone: UTC+3:30 (IRST)

Safashahr (Persian: صفاشهر)) (Note: Also romanized as Şafāshahr; formerly Dehbid (دهبید)) is a city in the Central District of Khorrambid County, Fars province, Iran, serving as capital of both the county and the district.

== History ==
The former village of Khorrami, which was the capital of Khorrami Rural District, merged with the city of Deh Bid in 1991 in the formation of Safashahr.

== Climate ==
Climate data for Safashahr (2006-2010 normals)
Month	Jan	Feb	Mar	Apr	May	Jun	Jul	Aug	Sep	Oct	Nov	Dec	Year
Daily mean °C (°F)	−0.1 (31.8)	4.0 (39.2)	7.5 (45.5)	11.1 (52.0)	16.7 (62.1)	20.6 (69.1)	23.3 (73.9)	21.2 (70.2)	17.3 (63.1)	12.8 (55.0)	6.8 (44.2)	1.8 (35.2)	11.9 (53.4)
Average precipitation mm (inches)	27.7 (1.09)	30.7 (1.21)	35.0 (1.38)	30.7 (1.21)	1.4 (0.06)	2.5 (0.10)	0.1 (0.00)	0.0 (0.0)	0.6 (0.02)	6.7 (0.26)	14.6 (0.57)	18.1 (0.71)	168.1 (6.61)
Source: IRIMO

== Demographics ==
=== Population ===
At the time of the 2006 National Census, the city's population was 22,254 in 5,556 households. The following census in 2011 counted 26,091 people in 7,045 households. The 2016 census measured the population of the city as 26,933 people in 8,036 households.
