= Gardaneh-ye Jenjan =

Gardaneh-ye Jenjan گردنه جنجان
- Village
- Location within Iran
- Coordinates: 30°13′15″N 51°27′27″E
- Country: Iran
- Province: Fars
- County: Mamasani
- Bakhsh: Central
- Rural District: Fahlian

Population (2006)
  - Total: 39
- Time zone: UTC+3:30 (IRST)
  - Summer (DST): UTC+4:30 (IRDT)

Gardaneh-ye Jenjan (Persian: گردنه جنجان, also Romanized as Gardaneh-ye Jenjān; also known as Jenjān, Jinjūn, and Lenjūn) is a village in Fahlian Rural District, in the Central District of Mamasani County, Fars province, Iran. At the 2006 census, its population was 39, in 8 families.
