= Muzaffar Ahmed (economist) =

Bangladeshi economist (1936–2012)

Muzaffar Ahmad
- মোজাফ্‌ফর আহমেদ
- Born: 27 March 1936; Kolkata, India
- Died: 22 May 2012 (aged 76); Dhaka, Bangladesh
- Resting place: Azimpur Graveyard, Dhaka

Academic background
- Education: Dhaka College; University of Chicago
- Awards: Ekushey Padak

Muzaffar Ahmad (27 March 1936 – 22 May 2012) was a Bangladeshi economist and an emeritus professor at the Institute of Business Administration of the University of Dhaka. He received his PhD from the University of Chicago. He was also the Chairman of the Trustee Board of Transparency International Bangladesh (TIB). Ahmed was awarded the Ekushey Padak by the Government of Bangladesh in 2008.

Ahmed was also associated with an organization called "Sushashoner Jonno Nagarik", popularly called "Sujon," which promotes good governance. Ahmed led Bangladesh Paribesh Andolon (BAPA), an environmental organization that campaigned against the encroachment of rivers by land grabbers.

== Books ==
- Ahmed, Muzaffar; Sobhan, Rehman (1980). Public enterprise in an intermediate regime: a study in the political economy of Bangladesh. Bangladesh: Bangladesh Institute of Development Studies. OCLC 773118575.
- Ahmed, Muzaffer (1981). Organizational framework, institutional relationships and management of public industrial enterprises: conference proceedings. New York: United Nations Industrial Development Organization. OCLC 10426398.
- Ahmed, Muzaffer (2002). Investing in ourselves: giving and fund raising in Bangladesh. Manila, Philippines: Asian Development Bank. ISBN 9789715614498.

== See also ==
- List of Bangladeshi economists
