= Lavardin, Iran =

Lavardin لاوردين
- Village
- Location within Iran
- Coordinates: 26°57′28″N 54°34′08″E
- Country: Iran
- Province: Hormozgan
- County: Bastak
- Bakhsh: Kukherd
- Rural District: Kukherd

Population (2006)
  - Total: 109
- Time zone: UTC+3:30 (IRST)
  - Summer (DST): UTC+4:30 (IRDT)

Lavardin (Persian: لاوردين, also Romanized as Lāvardīn; also known as Dīn) is a village in Kukherd Rural District, Kukherd District, Bastak County, Hormozgan Province, Iran. At the 2006 census, its population was 109, in 23 families.
