= Gudeh Rural District =

Rural district in Hormozgan province, Iran

Gudeh Rural District Persian: دهستان گوده
- Rural District
- Location within Iran
- Coordinates: 27°19′10″N 54°47′28″E
- Country: Iran
- Province: Hormozgan
- County: Bastak
- District: Central
- Capital: Dehang

Population (2016)
  - Total: 9,599
- Time zone: UTC+3:30 (IRST)

Gudeh Rural District (Persian: دهستان گوده) is in the Central District of Bastak County, Hormozgan province, Iran. Its capital is the village of Dehang.

== Demographics ==
=== Population ===
At the time of the 2006 National Census, the rural district's population was 7,979 in 1,603 households. There were 9,575 inhabitants in 2,329 households at the following census of 2011. The 2016 census measured the population of the rural district as 9,599 in 2,674 households. The most populous of its 27 villages was Zangard, with 2,635 people.
