= Qeshlaq Rural District (Khorrambid County) =

Rural district in Fars province, Iran

Qeshlaq Rural District Persian: دهستان قشلاق
- Rural District
- Location within Iran
- Coordinates: 30°35′13″N 52°57′34″E
- Country: Iran
- Province: Fars
- County: Khorrambid
- District: Central
- Capital: Qeshlaq

Population (2016)
  - Total: 3,945
- Time zone: UTC+3:30 (IRST)

Qeshlaq Rural District (Persian: دهستان قشلاق) is in the Central District of Khorrambid County, Fars province, Iran. Its capital is the village of Qeshlaq.

== Demographics ==
=== Population ===
At the 2006 National Census, the rural district's population was 3,524 in 836 households. There were 3,853 inhabitants in 1,040 households at the following census of 2011. The 2016 census noted a further rise in the population of the rural district to 3,945 in 1,133 households. The most populous of its 102 villages was Qeshlaq, with 1,072 people.
