= Shahidabad Rural District (Khorrambid County) =

Rural district in Fars province, Iran

Shahidabad Rural District Persian: دهستان شهيدآباد
- Rural District
- Location within Iran
- Coordinates: 30°24′30″N 53°13′13″E
- Country: Iran
- Province: Fars
- County: Khorrambid
- District: Mashhad-e Morghab
- Capital: Shahidabad

Population (2016)
  - Total: 3,377
- Time zone: UTC+3:30 (IRST)

Shahidabad Rural District (Persian: دهستان شهيدآباد) is in Mashhad-e Morghab District of Khorrambid County, Fars province, Iran. Its capital is the village of Shahidabad.

== Demographics ==
=== Population ===
At the time of the 2006 National Census, the rural district's population was 3,578 in 875 households. There were 3,199 inhabitants in 892 households at the following census of 2011. The 2016 census measured the population of the rural district as 3,377 in 1,012 households. The most populous of its 63 villages was Mozaffarabad, with 1,097 people.
