= Fatuiyeh Rural District =

Rural district in Hormozgan province, Iran

Fatuiyeh Rural District Persian: دهستان فتويه
- Rural District
- Location within Iran
- Coordinates: 27°18′14″N 54°18′10″E
- Country: Iran
- Province: Hormozgan
- County: Bastak
- District: Central
- Capital: Fatuiyeh

Population (2016)
  - Total: 12,497
- Time zone: UTC+3:30 (IRST)

Fatuiyeh Rural District (Persian: دهستان فتويه) is in the Central District of Bastak County, Hormozgan province, Iran. Its capital is the village of Fatuiyeh.

== Demographics ==
=== Population ===
At the time of the 2006 National Census, the rural district's population was 7,486 in 1,504 households. There were 9,265 inhabitants in 2,270 households at the following census of 2011. The 2016 census measured the population of the rural district as 12,497 in 3,365 households. The most populous of its 20 villages was Kuhij (now a city), with 3,597 people.
