= Khorrami Rural District =

Rural district in Fars province, Iran

Khorrami Rural District Persian: دهستان خرمي
- Rural District
- Location within Iran
- Coordinates: 30°41′26″N 53°15′32″E
- Country: Iran
- Province: Fars
- County: Khorrambid
- District: Central

Population (2016)
  - Total: 1,294
- Time zone: UTC+3:30 (IRST)

Khorrami Rural District (Persian: دهستان خرمي) is in the Central District of Khorrambid County, Fars province, Iran. Its capital was the village of Khorrami, which was merged in 1991 with the city of Deh Bid to form the city of Safashahr.

== Demographics ==
=== Population ===
At the time of the 2006 National Census, the rural district's population was 1,218 in 277 households. There were 1,317 inhabitants in 370 households at the following census of 2011. The 2016 census measured the population of the rural district as 1,294 in 419 households. The most populous of its 119 villages was Qazian-e Sofla, with 330 people.
