= Mashhad-e Morghab District =

District in Fars province, Iran

Mashhad-e Morghab District Persian: بخش مشهد مرغاب
- District
- Location within Iran
- Coordinates: 30°24′30″N 53°13′13″E
- Country: Iran
- Province: Fars
- County: Khorrambid
- Capital: Qaderabad

Population (2016)
  - Total: 18,350
- Time zone: UTC+3:30 (IRST)

Mashhad-e Morghab District (Persian: بخش مشهد مرغاب) is in Khorrambid County, Fars province, Iran. Its capital is the city of Qaderabad.

== Demographics ==
=== Population ===
At the time of the 2006 National Census, the district's population was 17,673 in 4,250 households. The following census in 2011 counted 18,991 people in 5,126 households. The 2016 census measured the population of the district as 18,350 inhabitants in 5,492 households.

=== Administrative divisions ===
Mashhad-e Morghab District Population
Administrative Divisions	2006	2011	2016
Shahidabad RD	3,578	3,199	3,377
Qaderabad (city)	14,095	15,792	14,973
Total	17,673	18,991	18,350
RD = Rural District
