= Dehtal Rural District =

Rural district in Hormozgan province, Iran

Dehtal Rural District Persian: دهستان ده تل
- Rural District
- Location within Iran
- Coordinates: 27°11′42″N 55°00′52″E
- Country: Iran
- Province: Hormozgan
- County: Bastak
- District: Central
- Capital: Dehtal

Population (2016)
  - Total: 8,119
- Time zone: UTC+3:30 (IRST)

Dehtal Rural District (Persian: دهستان ده تل) is in the Central District of Bastak County, Hormozgan province, Iran. Its capital is the village of Dehtal.

== Demographics ==
=== Population ===
At the time of the 2006 National Census, the rural district's population was 6,558 in 1,409 households. There were 8,433 inhabitants in 1,955 households at the following census of 2011. The 2016 census measured the population of the rural district as 8,119 in 2,273 households. The most populous of its 27 villages was Dehtal, with 1,702 people.
