= Central District (Khorrambid County) =

District in Fars province, Iran

Central District (Khorrambid County) Persian: بخش مرکزی شهرستان خرم‌بید
- District
- Location within Iran
- Coordinates: 30°37′04″N 53°08′13″E
- Country: Iran
- Province: Fars
- County: Khorrambid
- Capital: Safashahr

Population (2016)
  - Total: 32,172
- Time zone: UTC+3:30 (IRST)

The Central District of Khorrambid County (Persian: بخش مرکزی شهرستان خرم‌بید) is in Fars province, Iran. Its capital is the city of Safashahr.

== Demographics ==
=== Population ===
At the time of the 2006 National Census, the district's population was 26,996 in 6,669 households. The following census in 2011 counted 31,261 people in 8,455 households. The 2016 census measured the population of the district as 32,172 inhabitants in 9,588 households.

=== Administrative divisions ===
Central District (Khorrambid County) Population
Administrative Divisions	2006	2011	2016
Khorrami RD	1,218	1,317	1,294
Qeshlaq RD	3,524	3,853	3,945
Safashahr (city)	22,254	26,091	26,933
Total	26,996	31,261	32,172
RD = Rural District
