= Khorrambid County =

County in Fars province, Iran

Khorrambid County Persian: شهرستان خرم‌بید
- County
- Location of Khorrambid County in Fars province (top right, green)

- Location of Fars province in Iran
- Coordinates: 30°33′30″N 53°06′00″E
- Country: Iran
- Province: Fars
- Capital: Safashahr
- Districts: Central, Mashhad-e Morghab

Population (2016)
  - Total: 50,522
- Time zone: UTC+3:30 (IRST)

Khorrambid County (Persian: شهرستان خرم‌بید) is in Fars province, Iran. Its capital is the city of Safashahr.

== Demographics ==
=== Population ===
At the time of the 2006 National Census, the county's population was 44,669 in 31,291 households. The following census in 2011 counted 50,252 people in 13,561 households. The 2016 census measured the population of the county as 50,522 in 15,080 households.

=== Administrative divisions ===
Khorrambid County's population history and administrative structure over three consecutive censuses are shown in the following table.

Khorrambid County Population
Administrative Divisions	2006	2011	2016
Central District	26,996	31,261	32,172
Khorrami RD	1,218	1,317	1,294
Qeshlaq RD	3,524	3,853	3,945
Safashahr (city)	22,254	26,091	26,933
Mashhad-e Morghab District	17,673	18,991	18,350
Shahidabad RD	3,578	3,199	3,377
Qaderabad (city)	14,095	15,792	14,973
Total	44,669	50,252	50,522
RD = Rural District

== See also ==
- Shourab

Media related to Khorrambid County at Wikimedia Commons
