= Central District (Bastak County) =

District in Hormozgan province, Iran

Central District (Bastak County) Persian: بخش مرکزی شهرستان بستک
- District
- Location within Iran
- Coordinates: 27°16′43″N 54°42′03″E
- Country: Iran
- Province: Hormozgan
- County: Bastak
- Capital: Bastak

Population (2016)
  - Total: 40,174
- Time zone: UTC+3:30 (IRST)

The Central District of Bastak County (Persian: بخش مرکزی شهرستان بستک) is in Hormozgan province, Iran. Its capital is the city of Bastak.

== History ==
After the 2016 National Census, the village of Kuhij was elevated to the status of a city.

== Demographics ==
=== Population ===
At the time of the 2006 census, the district's population was 30,399 in 6,281 households. The following census in 2011 counted 36,498 people in 8,687 households. The 2016 census measured the population of the district as 40,174 inhabitants in 10,973 households.

=== Administrative divisions ===
Central District (Bastak County) Population
Administrative Divisions	2006	2011	2016
Dehtal RD	6,558	8,433	8,119
Fatuiyeh RD	7,486	9,265	12,497
Gudeh RD	7,979	9,575	9,599
Bastak (city)	8,376	9,225	9,959
Kuhij (city) (Note: Became a city after the 2016 census)			
Total	30,399	36,498	40,174
RD = Rural District
