= List of cities, towns and villages in Bushehr province =

A list of cities, towns and villages in Bushehr Province of southern Iran:

== Alphabetical ==
Cities are in bold text; all others are villages.

=== A ===
Ab Bui | Ab Garmu | Ab Pakhsh | Ab Pay-ye Arghuan | Abad | Abbasi | Abdan | Abgarmak | Abkosh | Abol ol Firuz | Abtavil | Ahmad Hoseyn | Ahmadabad | Ahmadabad | Ahmadabad | Ahmadi | Ahnejat | Ahram | Ahsham Qaedha | Ahsham-e Ahmad | Ahsham-e Ahmad | Ahsham-e Hajj Khurshid | Ahsham-e Hasan | Ahsham-e Jamal | Ahsham-e Khodadad | Ahsham-e Kohneh | Ahsham-e Manu Ahmadi | Ahsham-e Mohammad Heydar | Ahsham-e Sartal | Ahsham-e Zar-e Mohammad | Akbarabad | Akhand | Al-e Yusefi-ye Olya | Ali Changi | Ali Hoseyni | Ali Mohammadi | Ali Shahr | Ali Shams ol Din | Aliabad | Aliabad | Aliabad-e Jainag | Ameri | Ameri | Anarestan | Anarestan | Anbarak | Aqa Mir Ahmad | Arabi | Asaluyeh | Ashi | Ashur | Askari | Askari | Ateybeh | Azhdar Khowsh

=== B ===
Ba Monir | Baba Hasan-e Jonubi | Baba Hasan-e Shomali | Baba Mobaraki | Badam Zar | Baduleh | Bagh Ku | Bagh Pir | Baghan | Baghcheh-ye Jonubi | Baghcheh-ye Shomali | Bagh-e Ali | Bagh-e Behesht | Bagh-e Hesar | Bagh-e Salem-e Jonubi | Bagh-e Salem-e Shomali | Bagh-e Shali | Bagh-e Sheykh | Bagh-e Shur | Bagh-e Taj | Bahmanyar-e Gharbi | Bahmanyar-e Sharqi | Balangestan | Bandanow | Bandar Deylam | Bandar Deyr | Bandar Ganaveh | Bandar Kangan | Bandar Rig | Bandar Siraf | Bandargah | Bandu | Bandu | Banian | Bank | Barang-e Bozorg | Barang-e Kuchak | Barbu | Bardestan | Baregahi | Barikan | Barkeh-ye Chupan | Barmak | Bas-e Malakhi | Bashi | Bashirabad | Basri | Baztin | Bazui | Berikan | Besatin | Beshak | Bibi Khatun | Bid Boland | Bid Khun | Bid Khvar | Bidan | Bidu | Bidu | Bidu | Bidu | Biman | Binak | Bohr | Bohr-e Bagh | Bohr-e Hajji Nowshad | Bon Bid | Bonar-e Ab-e Shirin | Bonar-e Azadegan | Bonar-e Soleymani | Bonay-ye Rashed | Bondaruz | Boneh Gaz | Boneh-ye Abbas | Boneh-ye Ahmad | Boneh-ye Esmail | Boneh-ye Hajj Nemat | Boneh-ye Jaberi | Boneh-ye Khater | Boneh-ye Mohammad | Boniad | Bonju | Bonud | Boqeh | Borazjan | Bord Khun | Bord Khun-e Kohneh | Bostanu | Boveyri | Bovirat | Bowheyri | Boz Baz | Bozpar | Bu ol Fath | Bu ol Kheyr | Bujikdan | Bushehr | Bushehr Industrial Estate 2 | Bushkan

=== C ===
Chah Dul | Chah Gah | Chah Gah | Chah Khani | Chah Kutah | Chah Pir | Chah Talkh | Chah Talkh-e Jonubi | Chah Talkh-e Shomali | Chah Zangi | Chahak | Chahar Borj | Chahar Borj | Chahar Mahal | Chahar Rustai | Chahar Tol | Chah-e Arabi | Chah-e Bardi | Chah-e Hoseyn Jamal | Chah-e Majanun | Chah-e Mobarak | Chah-e Naft Nargesi | Chah-e Pahn | Chah-e Shirin | Chaheh | Chahleh | Cham Darreh | Cham Darvahi | Cham Tang | Chamcheshmeh | Cham-e Berkeh | Cham-e Shahab | Charab | Charak | Charmuk | Chavak | Chavoshi | Chehel Zari-ye Ajam | Chehel Zari-ye Arab | Cheshmeh | Choghadak

=== D ===
Dalaki | Dalaram | Dargu Shomali | Darreh Ban | Darreh Chah | Darvishi | Dasht-e Gur | Dasht-e Palang | Dashti-ye Esmail Khani | Dayu | Deh Kohneh | Deh Now | Deh Qaed | Dehdaran-e Olya | Dehdaran-e Sofla | Dehdari | Deh-e Now | Dehnow | Dehnow | Dehrud-e Olya | Dehrud-e Sofla | Dehuk | Delvar | Derang | Derazi | Do Lengeh | Do Palangu | Do Tusuru | Do Tuvali | Dom Rubah Dan | Domi Gaz | Dorudgah | Doveyreh | Dowlatabad | Dowrahak | Dumiti

=== E ===
Emamabad | Emamzadeh-ye Bedeh | Esfandiari | Eshkali Avaz Hoseyn | Eshkali Mohammad Hajji | Eshkali Seyyedi | Eshkali Zayer Hoseyn | Eslamabad | Eslamabad | Eslamabad | Esmail Mahmudi

=== F ===
Fakhr Avari | Faqih Ahmadan | Faqih-e Hasanan | Faramarzi | Faryab |

=== G ===
Gachavi-ye Mozaffarabad | Gadavi | Gahi | Galleh Zani | Ganaveh Kan | Gandomriz | Gandomzar | Gankhak-e Kowra | Gankhak-e Raisi | Gankhak-e Sheykhi | Gargur | Gashui | Gav Sefid-e Bozorg | Gav Sefid-e Kuchek | Gav Zard | Gavdar | Gaz Deraz | Gaz Khun | Gaz Luri | Gedai | Genavi | Geshi | Geshi | Gez Boland | Gharbeh | Ghul Kal | Golaki | Golangun | Golestan | Gomarun | Gonjeshki | Goreh | Govabin | Gowd-e Akhand | Gurak-e Dezhgah | Gurak-e Kalleh Bandi | Gurak-e Khvorshidi | Gurak-e Mohammad Rahimi | Gurak-e Sadat | Gurak-e Soleymani |

=== H ===
Hadakan | Haft Chah | Haft Jush | Hajjiabad | Hajjiabad | Hajjiabad | Haleh | Halileh | Halpahi | Hamud | Hana Shur | Harm-e Yak | Hasan Nezam | Hasanabad | Hasanabad-e Abu ol Fath | Hesar | Heydari | Heydari | Hongdan | Hoseyn Sadani | Hoseynabad | Hoseynabad | Hoseynabad | Hoseynaki | Hoseyn-e Zaeri

=== I ===
Ilshahr | Imam Hassan | Isvand

=== J ===
Jabrani | Jabri | Jainag | Jam | Jamali Zayer Hoseyn | Jamghari | Jamileh | Jamrag-e Shomali | Jarreh-ye Mian | Jarreh-ye Olya | Jashak | Jazireh-ye Jonubi | Jazireh-ye Shif | Jazireh-ye Shomali | Jetut | Jovey

=== K ===
Kabgan | Kaftaru | Kaki | Kakoli | Kalameh | Kalat | Kalat | Kalat | Kali | Kam Zard | Kamal Ahmadi | Kamali | Kardaneh | Karri | Kerdelan | Keshtu | Khalifehi | Khanicheh | Kharg | Kherreh | Kheyaru | Kheyrabad | Kheyrak | Khiari | Khiarzar | Khish Eshkan | Khodaruha | Khvajeh Gir | Khvor-e Shahabi | Khvormuj | Khvosh Ab | Khvosh Makan | Kidi | Kolar | Kolol | Kolol | Konar Bandak | Konar Bani | Konar Kheymeh | Konar Kuh | Konar Torshan | Konar-e Naru | Konari | Konari | Kordovan-e Olya | Kordovan-e Raisi | Kordovan-e Sofla | Koreh Band | Kuchu-ye Khorzehreh | Kuhak-e Kuchek | Kuhcher | Kuri Hayati | Kuri

=== L ===
Lardeh | Lavardeh | Lavar-e Gol | Lavar-e Razemi | Lavar-e Saheli | Laypeh | Leylak | Leylateyn | Lombadan-e Balai | Lombadan-e Hajjiabad | Lombadan-e Pain | Lombadan-e Sheykh Ahmad | Luhak

=== M ===
Majnun | Makhdan | Mal Barik | Mal Mir | Mal Sanan | Mal Sukhteh | Mal-e Gap | Mal-e Gavdan | Mal-e Gol | Mal-e Khalifeh | Mal-e Kharg-e Shemali | Mal-e Mahmud | Mal-e Mohammad Abdal Ali | Mal-e Qayed | Mal-e Shamab | Maleh-ye Khorg | Malgah | Mangeli | Manqal | Mansurabad | Mansuri-ye Jonubi | Mansuri-ye Shomali | Mansuri-ye Vosta | Manzar | Maqatel | Marhavay | Mazar Hoseyni | Mazraeh-ye Ab Shirin | Mazraeh-ye Hajj Ahmadi | Mian Dasht | Mian Kharreh-ye Bala | Milak | Milak | Miteh | Mohammad Abdi | Mohammad Ameri | Mohammad Jamali | Mohammad Riz | Mohammad Salehi | Mohammad Shahi | Mohammad Taheri | Mohammadabad | Mohammadi | Mohammadiabad | Mohrezi | Mokaberi | Mokhdan | Mokhdan | Molla Salemi | Mordeh Kheyr | Moru | Mozaffari-ye Jonubi | Mozaffari-ye Shomali | Murdi

=== N ===
Nakhah | Nakhl Taqi | Nakhl-e Ghanem | Nar-e Kuh | Nargesi Surveying Station | Naseri | Nazar Aqa | Neynizak | Nilab | Nowkan | Nowkar-e Gazi | Nowkar-e Mokhi | Nuclear Power Plant | Nurabad |

=== O ===
Omar | Owli-ye Jonubi | Owli-ye Shomali

=== P ===
Padari | Pahlavan Koshi | Palangi | Palangi | Parak | Pars-e Jonubi-ye Do | Pars-e Jonubi-ye Yek | Porganak | Posht Asman | Posht-e Tang | Poshtu | Puzgah

=== Q ===
Qaba Kolaki | Qaed-e Ebrahimi | Qaidi | Qaleh Bagh | Qaleh Kohneh | Qaleh Sarhan | Qaleh Sefid | Qaleh-ye Chah Kutah | Qaleh-ye Heydar | Qaleh-ye Meyan | Qaleh-ye Sukhteh | Qanat | Qanbari | Qaraval Khaneh | Qasab

=== R ===
Rahdar | Rameh Char | Razmabad | Riz | Rostami | Rostami | Rostami | Rud-e Shur | Rud-e-Faryab | Runi

=== S ===
Saba | Sadabad | Safiabad | Safiyeh | Sahmui-ye Jonubi | Sahmui-ye Shomali | Sakhtman Taher | Salemabad | Samal-e Jonubi | Samal-e Shomali | Samandaki | Samii | Sanavin Sana | Sar Cheshmeh | Sar Korreh | Sar Maleh | Sar Mastan | Sarajabad | Sarbast | Sarbast | Sarbasti | Sarmak | Sarmal | Sarqanat | Savahel | Seh Chah | Sena | Seydi | Shabankareh | Shah Firuz | Shah Pesar Mard | Shah Qasem | Shahijani | Shahniya | Shahr-e Khas | Shahr-e Viran | Shaldan va Baghi | Shamshiri | Shekarak | Sheykhian Mari | Sheykhian Solonji | Sheykhian-e Shahab | Shibarm | Shir-e Mard | Shirinak | Shirinu | Sholdan | Shonbeh | Shul | Shul | Shureki | Siah Makan-e Bozorg | Siah Mansur-e Olya | Siah Mansur-e Sofla | Sohu | Someyl Ali | Suk | Suru

=== T ===
Taj Maleki | Tak-e Puk | Takun | Tal-e Reis | Talheh | Talkhab | Talkhab-e Riz | Talkhu | Tall Borj | Tall-e Hajj Now Shad | Tang-e Darkash | Tang-e Eram | Tang-e Fariab | Tang-e Khvosh | Tang-e Man | Tang-e Nakhl | Tang-e Suk | Tang-e Zard | Tashan | Tavil Deraz | Tokhmari | Tol Siah | Tol-e Ashki | Tol-e Qaleh | Tol-e Sar Kuh | Tol-e Tall | Tonbak

=== V ===
Vahdatabad | Vahdatiyeh | Valfajar | Varavi

=== Z ===
Zaer Abbas | Zairabul | Zakariai | Zaki Alamdari | Zardaki-ye Olya | Zeydan | Ziad Mal | Ziarat | Ziarat | Ziba Makan | Zir Ahak | Zirmalleh | Zirrah | Zizar | Zobar
