= Pars-e Jonubi =

Pars-e Jonubi (Persian: پارس جنوبی) may refer to:

- Pars-e Jonubi 1
- Pars-e Jonubi 2

== See also ==
- F.C. Pars Jonoubi Jam, an association football club based in Jam, Bushehr, Iran
