= Do Palangu =

Coordinates: 27°50′21″N 51°41′02″E

Do Palangu دوپلنگو
- Village
- Interactive map of Do Palangu
- Country: Iran
- Province: Bushehr
- County: Deyr
- Bakhsh: Bord Khun
- Rural District: Bord Khun

Population (2006)
  - Total: 55
- Time zone: UTC+3:30 (IRST)
  - Summer (DST): UTC+4:30 (IRDT)

Do Palangu (Persian: دوپلنگو, also Romanized as Do Palangū) is a village in Bord Khun Rural District, Bord Khun District, Deyr County, Bushehr Province, Iran. At the 2006 census, its population was 55, in 13 families.
