= Talkhab-e Riz =

Talkhab-e Riz تلخ ابريز
- Village
- Location within Iran
- Coordinates: 29°12′23″N 51°30′14″E
- Country: Iran
- Province: Bushehr
- County: Tangestan
- Bakhsh: Central
- Rural District: Ahram

Population (2006)
  - Total: 18
- Time zone: UTC+3:30 (IRST)
  - Summer (DST): UTC+4:30 (IRDT)

Talkhab-e Riz (Persian: تلخ ابريز, also Romanized as Talkhāb-e Rīz; also known as Talkhāb) is a village in Ahram Rural District, in the Central District of Tangestan County, Bushehr Province, Iran. At the 2006 census, its population was 18, in 4 families.
