= Dom Rubah Dan =

Dom Rubah Dan دمروباه دان
- Village
- Location within Iran
- Coordinates: 28°50′30″N 51°17′03″E
- Country: Iran
- Province: Bushehr
- County: Tangestan
- Bakhsh: Central
- Rural District: Ahram

Population (2006)
  - Total: 202
- Time zone: UTC+3:30 (IRST)
  - Summer (DST): UTC+4:30 (IRDT)

Dom Rubah Dan (Persian: دمروباه دان, also Romanized as Dom Rūbāh Dān; also known as Deh Mardū, Dehmīrdān, Dom Reydān, and Domrū Bādān) is a village in Ahram Rural District, in the Central District of Tangestan County, Bushehr Province, Iran. At the 2006 census, its population was 202, in 46 families.
