= Takun =

Takun تكون
- Village
- Location within Iran
- Coordinates: 28°55′47″N 51°22′45″E
- Country: Iran
- Province: Bushehr
- County: Tangestan
- Bakhsh: Central
- Rural District: Ahram

Population (2006)
  - Total: 13
- Time zone: UTC+3:30 (IRST)
  - Summer (DST): UTC+4:30 (IRDT)

Takun (Persian: تكون, also Romanized as Tākūn) is a village in Ahram Rural District, in the Central District of Tangestan County, Bushehr Province, Iran. At the 2006 census, its population was 13, in 4 families.
