= Jamali Zayer Hoseyn =

Jamali Zayer Hoseyn جمالي زايرحسين
- Village
- Location within Iran
- Coordinates: 28°55′45″N 51°16′19″E
- Country: Iran
- Province: Bushehr
- County: Tangestan
- Bakhsh: Central
- Rural District: Ahram

Population (2006)
  - Total: 299
- Time zone: UTC+3:30 (IRST)
  - Summer (DST): UTC+4:30 (IRDT)

Jamali Zayer Hoseyn (Persian: جمالي زايرحسين, also Romanized as Jamālī Zāyer Ḩoseyn; also known as Jamālī Zā’er Ḩasan, Jamālī Zāyer Ḩoseynī, Zā’er Hasan Jamālī, and Zā’er Ḩoseyn-e Jamālī) is a village in Ahram Rural District, in the Central District of Tangestan County, Bushehr Province, Iran. 299 people, in 79 families, were living there as of the 2006 Census.
