= Mansuri-ye Shomali =

Mansuri-ye Shomali منصوري شمالي
- Village
- Location within Iran
- Coordinates: 28°58′08″N 51°16′09″E
- Country: Iran
- Province: Bushehr
- County: Tangestan
- Bakhsh: Central
- Rural District: Ahram

Population (2006)
  - Total: 99
- Time zone: UTC+3:30 (IRST)
  - Summer (DST): UTC+4:30 (IRDT)

Mansuri-ye Shomali (Persian: منصوري شمالي, also Romanized as Manşūrī-ye Shomālī) is a village in Ahram Rural District, in the Central District of Tangestan County, Bushehr Province, Iran. At the 2006 census, its population was 99, in 25 families.
