= Gaz Khun =

Gaz Khun گزخون
- Village
- Location within Iran
- Coordinates: 27°56′18″N 51°32′27″E
- Country: Iran
- Province: Bushehr
- County: Deyr
- Bakhsh: Bord Khun
- Rural District: Bord Khun

Population (2006)
  - Total: 24
- Time zone: UTC+3:30 (IRST)
  - Summer (DST): UTC+4:30 (IRDT)

Gaz Khun (Persian: گزخون, also Romanized as Gaz Khūn and Gazkhūn; also known as Gas Khūn) is a village in Bord Khun Rural District, Bord Khun District, Deyr County, Bushehr Province, Iran. At the 2006 census, its population was 24, in 4 families.
