= Domi Gaz =

Domi Gaz دمي گز
- Village
- Location within Iran
- Coordinates: 27°50′22″N 51°41′03″E
- Country: Iran
- Province: Bushehr
- County: Deyr
- Bakhsh: Bord Khun
- Rural District: Bord Khun

Population (2006)
  - Total: 65
- Time zone: UTC+3:30 (IRST)
  - Summer (DST): UTC+4:30 (IRDT)

Domi Gaz (Persian: دمي گز, also Romanized as Domī Gaz and Domey Gaz; also known as Dam-e-Gaz, Damīgaz-e Shomālī, Dam-i-Gazi, and Dom Gazī) is a village in Bord Khun Rural District, Bord Khun District, Deyr County, Bushehr Province, Iran. At the 2006 census, its population was 65, in 17 families.
