= Mal Sukhteh =

Mal Sukhteh ملسوخته
- Village
- Location within Iran
- Coordinates: 27°57′18″N 51°31′38″E
- Country: Iran
- Province: Bushehr
- County: Deyr
- Bakhsh: Bord Khun
- Rural District: Bord Khun

Population (2006)
  - Total: 62
- Time zone: UTC+3:30 (IRST)
  - Summer (DST): UTC+4:30 (IRDT)

Mal Sukhteh (Persian: ملسوخته, also Romanized as Mal Sūkhteh) is a village in Bord Khun Rural District, Bord Khun District, Deyr County, Bushehr Province, Iran. At the 2006 census, its population was 62, in 11 families.
