= Omar, Bushehr =

Omar امار
- Village
- Location within Iran
- Coordinates: 28°51′35″N 51°17′13″E
- Country: Iran
- Province: Bushehr
- County: Tangestan
- Bakhsh: Central
- Rural District: Ahram

Population (2006)
  - Total: 101
- Time zone: UTC+3:30 (IRST)
  - Summer (DST): UTC+4:30 (IRDT)

Omar (Persian: امار, also Romanized as ‘Omār) is a village in Ahram Rural District, in the Central District of Tangestan County, Bushehr Province, Iran. At the 2006 census, its population was 101, in 24 families.
