= Shir-e Mard, Bushehr =

Shir-e Mard شيرمرد
- Village
- Location within Iran
- Coordinates: 29°00′45″N 51°21′09″E
- Country: Iran
- Province: Bushehr
- County: Tangestan
- Bakhsh: Central
- Rural District: Ahram

Population (2006)
  - Total: 37
- Time zone: UTC+3:30 (IRST)
  - Summer (DST): UTC+4:30 (IRDT)

Shir-e Mard (Persian: شيرمرد, also Romanized as Shīr-e Mard and Shīr Mard; also known as Āqā Shīr Mard) is a village in Ahram Rural District, in the Central District of Tangestan County, Bushehr Province, Iran. At the 2006 census, its population was 37, in 12 families.
