= Kali, Bushehr =

Kali کالو/كالی
- Village
- Interactive map of Kali
- Country: Iran
- Province: Bushehr
- County: Deyr
- Bakhsh: Bord Khun
- Rural District: Bord Khun

Population (2006)
  - Total: 34
- Time zone: UTC+3:30 (IRST)
  - Summer (DST): UTC+4:30 (IRDT)

Kali (Persian: کالو/كالی, also romanized as Kālī) is a village in Bord Khun Rural District, Bord Khun District, Deyr County, Bushehr Province, Iran. At the 2006 census, its population was 34, in 7 families.

This village has small school of world.
