= Banian, Bushehr =

Banian بنيان
- Village
- Location within Iran
- Coordinates: 28°47′11″N 51°26′08″E
- Country: Iran
- Province: Bushehr
- County: Tangestan
- Bakhsh: Central
- Rural District: Ahram

Population (2006)
  - Total: 238
- Time zone: UTC+3:30 (IRST)
  - Summer (DST): UTC+4:30 (IRDT)

Banian (Persian: بنيان, also Romanized as Banīān, Banyān, and Bonyān; also known as Banyoon and Banyūn) is a village in Ahram Rural District, in the Central District of Tangestan County, Bushehr Province, Iran. At the 2006 census, its population was 238, in 61 families.
