= Mansuri-ye Jonubi =

Mansuri-ye Jonubi منصوري جنوبي
- Village
- Location within Iran
- Coordinates: 28°57′28″N 51°16′16″E
- Country: Iran
- Province: Bushehr
- County: Tangestan
- Bakhsh: Central
- Rural District: Ahram

Population (2006)
  - Total: 373
- Time zone: UTC+3:30 (IRST)
  - Summer (DST): UTC+4:30 (IRDT)

Mansuri-ye Jonubi (Persian: منصوري جنوبي, also Romanized as Manşūrī-ye Jonūbī) is a village in Ahram Rural District, in the Central District of Tangestan County, Bushehr Province, Iran. At the 2006 census, its population was 373, in 94 families.
