= Mal-e Gol =

Mal-e Gol مل گل
- Village
- Location within Iran
- Coordinates: 28°34′15″N 51°23′05″E
- Country: Iran
- Province: Bushehr
- County: Dashti
- Bakhsh: Central
- Rural District: Markazi

Population (2006)
  - Total: 308
- Time zone: UTC+3:30 (IRST)
  - Summer (DST): UTC+4:30 (IRDT)

Mal-e Gol (Persian: مل گل, also Romanized as Malegol; also known as Mal-e Ashk) is a village in Markazi Rural District, in the Central District of Dashti County, Bushehr Province, Iran. At the 2006 census, its population was 308, in 68 families.
