= Varavi, Bushehr =

Varavi وراوي
- Village
- Location within Iran
- Coordinates: 28°33′20″N 51°16′25″E
- Country: Iran
- Province: Bushehr
- County: Dashti
- Bakhsh: Central
- Rural District: Khvormuj

Population (2006)
  - Total: 184
- Time zone: UTC+3:30 (IRST)
  - Summer (DST): UTC+4:30 (IRDT)

Varavi (Persian: وراوي, also Romanized as Varāvī) is a village in Khvormuj Rural District, in the Central District of Dashti County, Bushehr province, Iran. At the 2006 census, its population was 184, in 39 families.
