= Mal-e Kharg-e Shemali =

Mal-e Kharg-e Shemali مل خرك شمالي
- Village
- Location within Iran
- Coordinates: 27°58′02″N 51°56′08″E
- Country: Iran
- Province: Bushehr
- County: Deyr
- Bakhsh: Central
- Rural District: Howmeh

Population (2006)
  - Total: 50
- Time zone: UTC+3:30 (IRST)
  - Summer (DST): UTC+4:30 (IRDT)

Mal-e Kharg-e Shemali (Persian: مل خرك شمالي, also Romanized as Mal-e Kharg-e Shemālī; also known as Malakeh, Mal-e Khar, Mal-e Kharg, Mal Kharg, and Mol-e Kharg) is a village in Howmeh Rural District, in the Central District of Deyr County, Bushehr Province, Iran. At the 2006 census, its population was 50, in 10 families.
