= Bid Khar =

Bid Khvar بيدخوار
- Village
- Location within Iran
- Coordinates: 27°47′32″N 52°21′01″E
- Country: Iran
- Province: Bushehr
- County: Jam
- Bakhsh: Central
- Rural District: Jam

Population (2006)
  - Total: 141
- Time zone: UTC+3:30 (IRST)

Bid Khvar (Persian: بيدخوار, also Romanized as Bīd Khvār; also known as Bād-e Khvār, Bīda Khar, Bīdeh Khvār, and Bid Khar) is a village in Jam Rural District, in the Central District of Jam County, Bushehr Province, Iran. At the 2006 census, its population was 141, in 32 families.
