= Qaba Kolaki =

Village in Bushehr province, Iran

Qaba Kolaki Persian: قباكلكي
- Village
- Location within Iran
- Coordinates: 28°54′10″N 51°09′31″E
- Country: Iran
- Province: Bushehr
- County: Tangestan
- District: Central
- Rural District: Baghak

Population (2016)
  - Total: 1,022
- Time zone: UTC+3:30 (IRST)

Qaba Kolaki (Persian: قباكلكي) (Note: Also romanized as Qabā Kolakī) is a village in Baghak Rural District of the Central District in Tangestan County, Bushehr province, Iran.

== Demographics ==
=== Population ===
At the time of the 2006 National Census, the village's population was 1,046 in 263 households. The following census in 2011 counted 1,011 people in 289 households. The 2016 census measured the population of the village as 1,022 people in 302 households.
