= Tak-e Puk =

Tak-e Puk تاك پوك
- Village
- Location within Iran
- Coordinates: 27°53′52″N 52°14′17″E
- Country: Iran
- Province: Bushehr
- County: Jam
- Bakhsh: Central
- Rural District: Kuri

Population (2006)
  - Total: 51
- Time zone: UTC+3:30 (IRST)
  - Summer (DST): UTC+4:30 (IRDT)

Tak-e Puk (Persian: تاك پوك, also Romanized as Tāk-e Pūk) is a village in Kuri Rural District, in the Central District of Jam County, Bushehr Province, Iran. At the 2006 census, its population was 51, in 12 families.
