= Chamcheshmeh =

Chamcheshmeh چم چشمه
- Village
- Location within Iran
- Coordinates: 27°52′43″N 52°15′27″E
- Country: Iran
- Province: Bushehr
- County: Jam
- Bakhsh: Central
- Rural District: Kuri

Population (2006)
  - Total: 237
- Time zone: UTC+3:30 (IRST)
  - Summer (DST): UTC+4:30 (IRDT)

Chamcheshmeh (Persian: چم چشمه, also Romanized as Cham Chashmeh and Cham Cheshmeh) is a village in Kuri Rural District, in the Central District of Jam County, Bushehr Province, Iran.

== Demographics ==
At the 2006 census, its population was 237, in 52 families.
