= Mohammad Abdi, Iran =

Mohammad Abdi محمدعبدي
- Village
- Location within Iran
- Coordinates: 28°48′06″N 51°13′53″E
- Country: Iran
- Province: Bushehr
- County: Tangestan
- Bakhsh: Central
- Rural District: Baghak

Population (2006)
  - Total: 23
- Time zone: UTC+3:30 (IRST)
  - Summer (DST): UTC+4:30 (IRDT)

Mohammad Abdi (Persian: محمدعبدي, also Romanized as Moḩammad ‘Abdī) is a village in Baghak Rural District, in the Central District of Tangestan County, Bushehr Province, Iran. At the 2006 census, its population was 23, in 5 families.
