= Do Tuvali =

Do Tuvali دوتوولي
- valley
- Location within Iran
- Coordinates: 27°57′04″N 52°09′44″E
- Country: Iran
- Province: Bushehr
- County: Jam
- Bakhsh: Riz
- Rural District: Tashan

Population (2006)
  - Total: 25
- Time zone: UTC+3:30 (IRST)
  - Summer (DST): UTC+4:30 (IRDT)

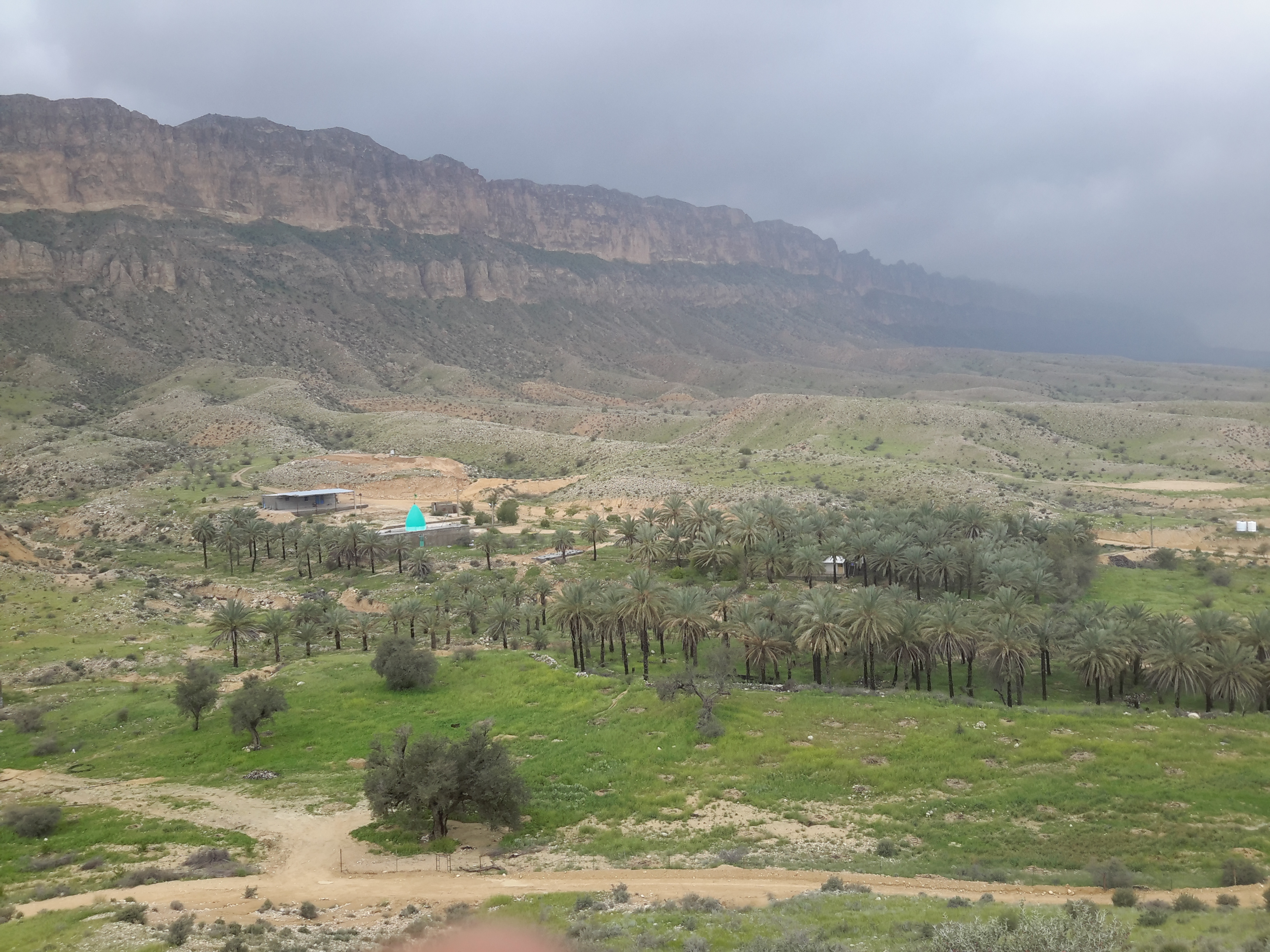
Dimidi, the birthplace of myth and magic

Do Tuvali (Persian: دوتوولي, also Romanized as Do Tūvalī and Dotūvalī) is a valley in Tashan Rural District, Riz District, Jam County, Bushehr Province, Iran. At the 2006 census, its population was 25, in 4 families. The name Do Tuvali can be thought of as a combination of Doto + Valley (the valley of Doto). Such linguistic pattern is only accidental. Dotovalley is a U shape valley. Zagross mountain range, locally called Pakemar, stretches beyond Dotovalley. Shaded by the Lime and Palm gardens, Dotovalley is a popular destination for those who want to fulfill the needs of the soul.
