= Qanbari, Bushehr =

Qanbari قنبري
- Village
- Location within Iran
- Coordinates: 28°47′20″N 51°14′12″E
- Country: Iran
- Province: Bushehr
- County: Tangestan
- Bakhsh: Central
- Rural District: Baghak

Population (2006)
  - Total: 31
- Time zone: UTC+3:30 (IRST)
  - Summer (DST): UTC+4:30 (IRDT)

Qanbari (Persian: قنبري, also Romanized as Qanbarī) is a village in Baghak Rural District, in the Central District of Tangestan County, Bushehr Province, Iran. At the 2006 census, its population was 31, in 6 families.
