= Posht Asman =

Posht Asman پشت اسمان
- Village
- Interactive map of Posht Asman
- Country: Iran
- Province: Bushehr
- County: Deyr
- Bakhsh: Central
- Rural District: Howmeh

Population (2006)
  - Total: 18
- Time zone: UTC+3:30 (IRST)
  - Summer (DST): UTC+4:30 (IRDT)

Posht Asman (Persian: پشت اسمان, also Romanized as Posht Āsmān) is a village in Howmeh Rural District, in the Central District of Deyr County, Bushehr Province, Iran. At the 2006 census, its population was 18 people, comprised in four families.
