= Sarbasti =

Sarbasti سربستي
- Village
- Location within Iran
- Coordinates: 28°47′16″N 51°14′25″E
- Country: Iran
- Province: Bushehr
- County: Tangestan
- Bakhsh: Central
- Rural District: Baghak

Population (2006)
  - Total: 25
- Time zone: UTC+3:30 (IRST)
  - Summer (DST): UTC+4:30 (IRDT)

Sarbasti (Persian: سربستي, also Romanized as Sarbastī; also known as Sarbast) is a village in Baghak Rural District, in the Central District of Tangestan County, Bushehr Province, Iran. At the 2006 census, its population was 25, in 4 families.
