= Ahnejat =

Ahnejat اهنجت
- Village
- Location within Iran
- Coordinates: 28°05′12″N 51°57′23″E
- Country: Iran
- Province: Bushehr
- County: Jam
- Bakhsh: Riz
- Rural District: Anarestan

Population (2006)
  - Total: 25
- Time zone: UTC+3:30 (IRST)
  - Summer (DST): UTC+4:30 (IRDT)

Ahnejat (Persian: اهنجت; also known as Ahnehjad) is a village that is located in Anarestan Rural District, in the Riz District, Jam County, Bushehr Province, Iran. At the 2006 census, its population was 25, in 6 families.
