= Sar Cheshmeh, Bushehr =

Village in Bushehr province, Iran

Sar Cheshmeh Persian: سرچشمه
- Village
- Location within Iran
- Coordinates: 28°07′39″N 51°54′52″E
- Country: Iran
- Province: Bushehr
- County: Jam
- District: Riz
- Rural District: Anarestan

Population (2016)
  - Total: 407
- Time zone: UTC+3:30 (IRST)

Sar Cheshmeh (Persian: سرچشمه) (Note: Also romanized as Sar Chashmeh) is a village in Anarestan Rural District of Riz District in Jam County, Bushehr province, Iran.

== Demographics ==
=== Population ===
At the time of the 2006 National Census, the village's population was 326 in 71 households. The following census in 2011 counted 306 people in 75 households. The 2016 census measured the population of the village as 407 people in 118 households. It was the most populous village in its rural district.
