= Golangun =

Village in Bushehr province, Iran

Golangun Persian: گلنگون
- Village
- Location within Iran
- Coordinates: 29°05′56″N 51°12′33″E
- Country: Iran
- Province: Bushehr
- County: Tangestan
- District: Central
- Rural District: Ahram

Population (2016)
  - Total: 645
- Time zone: UTC+3:30 (IRST)

Golangun (Persian: گلنگون) (Note: Also romanized as Golangūn; also known as Kolangūn) is a village in Ahram Rural District of the Central District in Tangestan County, Bushehr province, Iran.

== Demographics ==
=== Population ===
At the time of the 2006 National Census, the village's population was 645 in 139 households. The following census in 2011 counted 664 people in 172 households. The 2016 census measured the population of the village as 645 people in 180 households.
