= Gandomzar =

Village in Bushehr province, Iran

Gandomzar Persian: گندمزار
- Village
- Location within Iran
- Coordinates: 27°57′36″N 52°10′31″E
- Country: Iran
- Province: Bushehr
- County: Jam
- District: Riz
- Rural District: Tashan

Population (2016)
  - Total: 471
- Time zone: UTC+3:30 (IRST)

Gandomzar (Persian: گندمزار) (Note: Also romanized as Gandomzār) is a village in Tashan Rural District of Riz District in Jam County, Bushehr province, Iran.

== Demographics ==
=== Population ===
At the time of the 2006 National Census, the village's population was 359 in 83 households. The following census in 2011 counted 409 people in 110 households. The 2016 census measured the population of the village as 471 people in 127 households.
