= Murdi, Bushehr =

Murdi موردي
- Village
- Location within Iran
- Coordinates: 28°03′05″N 51°58′43″E
- Country: Iran
- Province: Bushehr
- County: Jam
- Bakhsh: Riz
- Rural District: Anarestan

Population (2006)
  - Total: 38
- Time zone: UTC+3:30 (IRST)
  - Summer (DST): UTC+4:30 (IRDT)

Murdi (Persian: موردي, also Romanized as Mūrdī) is a village in Anarestan Rural District, Riz District, Jam County, Bushehr Province, Iran. At the 2006 census, its population was 38, in 10 families.
