= Ziad Mal =

Ziad Mal زيادمال
- Village
- Location within Iran
- Coordinates: 28°53′13″N 51°09′51″E
- Country: Iran
- Province: Bushehr
- County: Tangestan
- Bakhsh: Central
- Rural District: Baghak

Population (2006)
  - Total: 45
- Time zone: UTC+3:30 (IRST)
  - Summer (DST): UTC+4:30 (IRDT)

Ziad Mal (Persian: زيادمال, also Romanized as Zīād Māl) is a village in Baghak Rural District, in the Central District of Tangestan County, Bushehr Province, Iran. At the 2006 census, its population was 45, in 13 families.
