= Khanicheh =

Khanicheh خانيچه
- Village
- Location within Iran
- Coordinates: 27°55′00″N 52°22′12″E
- Country: Iran
- Province: Bushehr
- County: Jam
- Bakhsh: Central
- Rural District: Jam

Population (2006)
  - Total: 20
- Time zone: UTC+3:30 (IRST)
  - Summer (DST): UTC+4:30 (IRDT)

Khanicheh (Persian: خانيچه, also Romanized as Khānīcheh) is a village in Jam Rural District, in the Central District of Jam County, Bushehr Province, Iran. At the 2006 census, its population was 20, in 5 families.
