= Mokhdan, Deyr =

Coordinates: 28°45′06″N 51°30′00″E

Mokhdan مخدان
- Village
- Interactive map of Mokhdan
- Country: Iran
- Province: Bushehr
- County: Deyr
- Bakhsh: Central
- Rural District: Howmeh

Population (2006)
  - Total: 37
- Time zone: UTC+3:30 (IRST)
  - Summer (DST): UTC+4:30 (IRDT)

Mokhdan (Persian: مخدان, also Romanized as Mokhdān) is a village in Howmeh Rural District, in the Central District of Deyr County, Bushehr Province, Iran. At the 2006 census, its population was 37, in 9 families.
