= Naraku =

Naraku may refer to:

- Naraku (wrestler), ring name of Japanese professional wrestler Takaaki Watanabe
- Naraku, Iran, a village in Bushehr Province, Iran
- Naraka (Buddhism), one of the underworlds of Buddhism
- Naraku (奈落), a character in InuYasha
- Ninja Slayer's ninja spirit, from Ninja Slayer
