= Bandanow =

Bandanow بندانو
- Village
- Location within Iran
- Coordinates: 27°52′29″N 52°15′56″E
- Country: Iran
- Province: Bushehr
- County: Jam
- Bakhsh: Central
- Rural District: Jam

Population (2006)
  - Total: 135
- Time zone: UTC+3:30 (IRST)

Bandanow (Persian: بندانو, also Romanized as Bandānow) is a village in Jam Rural District, in the Central District of Jam County, Bushehr Province, Iran. At the 2006 census, its population was 135, in 34 families.
