= Galleh Zani =

Galleh Zani گله زني
- Village
- Location within Iran
- Coordinates: 27°57′58″N 51°47′55″E
- Country: Iran
- Province: Bushehr
- County: Deyr
- Bakhsh: Central
- Rural District: Abdan

Population (2006)
  - Total: 24
- Time zone: UTC+3:30 (IRST)
  - Summer (DST): UTC+4:30 (IRDT)

Galleh Zani (Persian: گله زني, also Romanized as Galleh Zanī and Galleh Zenī; also known as Gelzanī) is a village in Abdan Rural District, in the Central District of Deyr County, Bushehr Province, Iran. At the 2006 census, its population was 24, in 5 families.
