= Chavoshi =

Village in Bushehr province, Iran

Chavoshi Persian: چاوشي
- Village
- Location within Iran
- Coordinates: 28°40′48″N 51°14′15″E
- Country: Iran
- Province: Bushehr
- County: Dashti
- District: Central
- Rural District: Khvormuj

Population (2016)
  - Total: 630
- Time zone: UTC+3:30 (IRST)

Chavoshi (Persian: چاوشي) (Note: Also romanized as Chavoshi; also known as Chāh Voshī-ye Janūbī and Chāvoshī-ye Jonūbī) is a village in Khvormuj Rural District of the Central District in Dashti County, Bushehr province, Iran.

== Demographics ==
=== Population ===
At the time of the 2006 National Census, the village's population was 581 in 138 households. The following census in 2011 counted 792 people in 181 households. The 2016 census measured the population of the village as 630 people in 189 households.
