= Qaleh Bagh =

Qaleh Bagh قلعه باغ
- Village
- Location within Iran
- Coordinates: 28°02′28″N 52°03′36″E
- Country: Iran
- Province: Bushehr
- County: Jam
- Bakhsh: Riz
- Rural District: Anarestan

Population (2006)
  - Total: 109
- Time zone: UTC+3:30 (IRST)
  - Summer (DST): UTC+4:30 (IRDT)

Qaleh Bagh (Persian: قلعه باغ, also Romanized as Qal‘eh Bāgh) is a village in Anarestan Rural District, Riz District, Jam County, Bushehr Province, Iran. At the 2006 census, its population was 109, in 18 families.
