= Nilab =

Nilab نيلاب
- Village
- Location within Iran
- Coordinates: 27°52′29″N 52°16′24″E
- Country: Iran
- Province: Bushehr
- County: Jam
- Bakhsh: Central
- Rural District: Jam

Population (2006)
  - Total: 91
- Time zone: UTC+3:30 (IRST)
  - Summer (DST): UTC+4:30 (IRDT)

Nilab (Persian: نيلاب, also Romanized as Nīlāb) is a village in Jam Rural District, in the Central District of Jam County, Bushehr Province, Iran. At the 2006 census, its population was 91 people in 22 families.
