= Charmuk =

Charmuk چرموك
- Village
- Location within Iran
- Coordinates: 27°58′26″N 52°13′31″E
- Country: Iran
- Province: Bushehr
- County: Jam
- Bakhsh: Riz
- Rural District: Tashan

Population (2006)
  - Total: 63
- Time zone: UTC+3:30 (IRST)
  - Summer (DST): UTC+4:30 (IRDT)

Charmuk (Persian: چرموك, also Romanized as Charmūk; also known as Charmū) is a village in Tashan Rural District, Riz District, Jam County, Bushehr Province, Iran. At the 2006 census, its population was 63, in 15 families.
