= Mohammad Taheri, Iran =

Mohammad Taheri محمدطاهری
- Village
- Location within Iran
- Coordinates: 28°48′59″N 51°12′36″E
- Country: Iran
- Province: Bushehr
- County: Tangestan
- Bakhsh: Central
- Rural District: Baghak

Population (2006)
  - Total: 208
- Time zone: UTC+3:30 (IRST)
  - Summer (DST): UTC+4:30 (IRDT)

Mohammad Taheri or Mohammad-Taheri (Persian: محمدطاهری, also Romanized as Moḩammad Ţāherī) is a village in Baghak Rural District, in the Central District of Tangestan County, Bushehr Province, Iran. At the 2006 census, its population was 208, in 55 families.
