= Tol-e Qaleh =

Tol-e Qaleh تل قلعه
- Village
- Location within Iran
- Coordinates: 27°52′01″N 52°17′08″E
- Country: Iran
- Province: Bushehr
- County: Jam
- Bakhsh: Central
- Rural District: Jam

Population (2006)
  - Total: 190
- Time zone: UTC+3:30 (IRST)
  - Summer (DST): UTC+4:30 (IRDT)

Tol-e Qaleh (Persian: تل قلعه, also Romanized as Tol-e Qal‘eh and Tol Qal‘eh) is a village in Jam Rural District, in the Central District of Jam County, Bushehr Province, Iran. At the 2006 census, its population was 190, in 36 families.
