= Mond protected area =

Protected area in southern Iran

Coordinates: 28.0°N 51.4°E

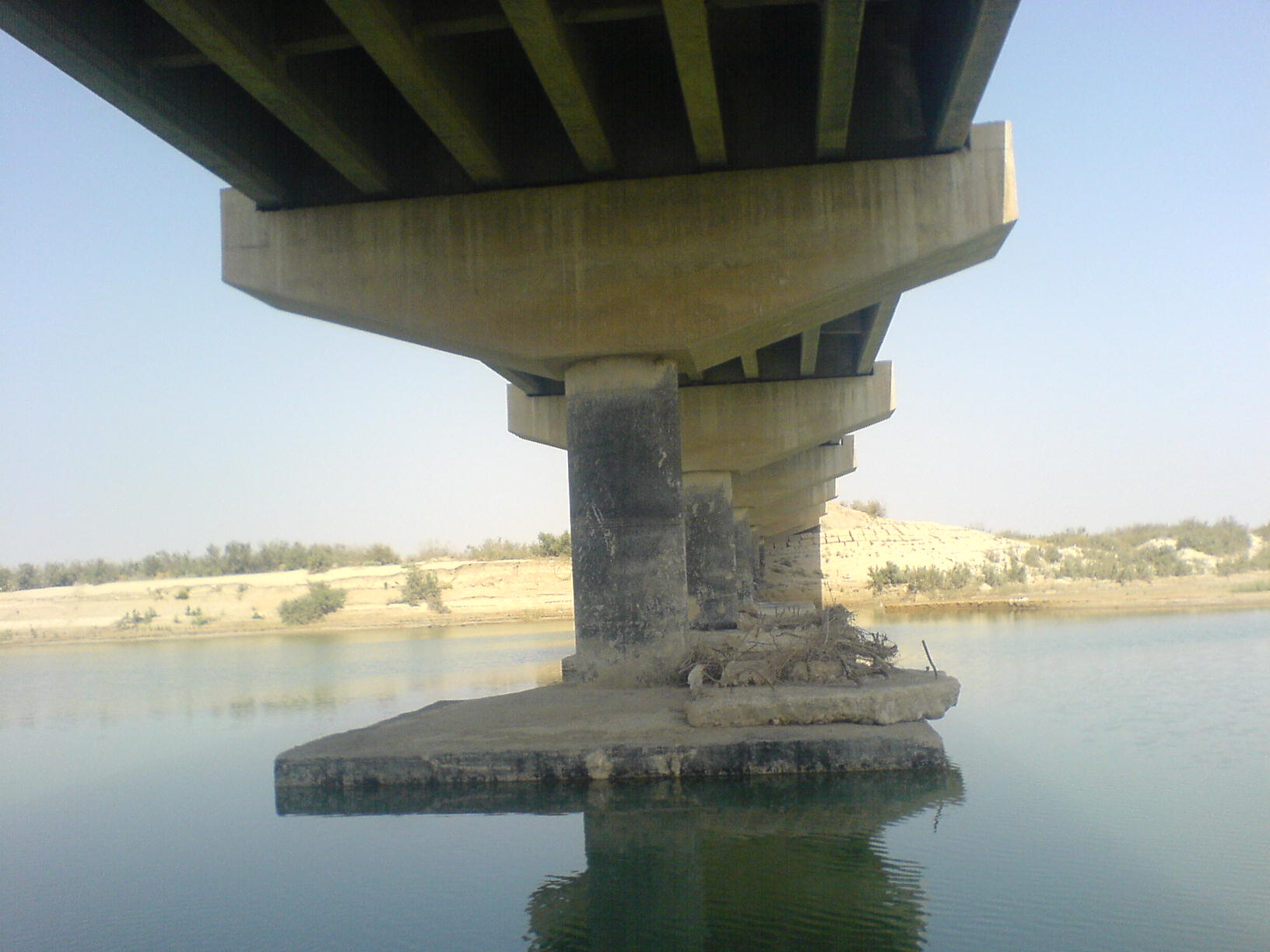
Mond River

Mond protected area (Persian: منطقه حفاظت‌شده مند) is a 46,000-hectare (110,000-acre) plain and desert protected area on the Persian Gulf coast of the Bord Khun District, Deyr County, Bushehr Province in southern Iran. The protected area was established in 1976. The Mond River empties into the Persian Gulf in the northern part of the area.
