= Mal-e Gavdan =

Mal-e Gavdan مل گاودان
- Village
- Location within Iran
- Coordinates: 28°33′09″N 51°22′43″E
- Country: Iran
- Province: Bushehr
- County: Dashti
- Bakhsh: Central
- Rural District: Markazi

Population (2006)
  - Total: 134
- Time zone: UTC+3:30 (IRST)
  - Summer (DST): UTC+4:30 (IRDT)

Mal-e Gavdan (Persian: مل گاودان, also Romanized as Mal-e Gāvdān, Malegāydān, and Mal Gāv Dān) is a village in Markazi Rural District, in the Central District of Dashti County, Bushehr Province, Iran. At the 2006 census, its population was 134, in 33 families.
