= Ab Bui =

Ab Bui آب‌بویی
- Village
- Location within Iran
- Coordinates: 28°46′37″N 51°18′13″E
- Country: Iran
- Province: Bushehr
- County: Tangestan
- Bakhsh: Central
- Rural District: Baghak

Population (2006)
  - Total: 28
- Time zone: UTC+3:30 (IRST)
  - Summer (DST): UTC+4:30 (IRDT)

Ab Bui (Persian: آب‌بویی, also Romanized as Āb Bū’ī) is a village in Baghak Rural District, in the Central District of Tangestan County, Bushehr Province, Iran. At the 2006 census, its population was 28, in 8 families.
