= Ahsham-e Ahmad, Deyr =

Coordinates: 29°14′06″N 50°44′09″E

Ahsham-e Ahmad احشام احمد
- Village
- Interactive map of Ahsham-e Ahmad
- Country: Iran
- Province: Bushehr
- County: Deyr
- Bakhsh: Central
- Rural District: Howmeh

Population (2006)
  - Total: 59
- Time zone: UTC+3:30 (IRST)
  - Summer (DST): UTC+4:30 (IRDT)

Ahsham-e Ahmad (Persian: احشام احمد, also Romanized as Aḩsham-e Aḩmad) is a village in Howmeh Rural District, in the Central District of Deyr County, Bushehr Province, Iran. At the 2006 census, its population was 59, in 11 families.
