= Chah Pir =

Village in Bushehr province, Iran

Chah Pir Persian: چاه پير
- Village
- Location within Iran
- Coordinates: 28°59′57″N 51°13′15″E
- Country: Iran
- Province: Bushehr
- County: Tangestan
- District: Central
- Rural District: Ahram

Population (2016)
  - Total: 1,077
- Time zone: UTC+3:30 (IRST)

Chah Pir (Persian: چاه پير) (Note: Also romanized as Chāh Pīr, Chāh-e Pīr, and Chāh-i-Pīr; also known as Shāh Pīr) is a village in Ahram Rural District of the Central District in Tangestan County, Bushehr province, Iran.

== Demographics ==
=== Population ===
At the time of the 2006 National Census, the village's population was 897 in 207 households. The following census in 2011 counted 1,018 people in 284 households. The 2016 census measured the population of the village as 1,077 people in 307 households.
