= Jashak =

Jashak جاشك
- Village
- Location within Iran
- Coordinates: 28°09′59″N 51°38′57″E
- Country: Iran
- Province: Bushehr
- County: Deyr
- Bakhsh: Central
- Rural District: Abdan

Population (2006)
  - Total: 123
- Time zone: UTC+3:30 (IRST)
  - Summer (DST): UTC+4:30 (IRDT)

Jashak (Persian: جاشك, also Romanized as Jāshak; also known as Chāshk) is a village in Abdan Rural District, in the Central District of Deyr County, Bushehr Province, Iran. At the 2006 census, its population was 123, in 24 families.

== See also ==
- Jashak salt dome
