= Tall-e Hajj Now Shad =

Village in Bushehr province, Iran

Tall-e Hajj Now Shad Persian: تل حاج نوشاد
- Village
- Country: Iran
- Province: Bushehr
- County: Jam
- District: Riz
- Rural District: Anarestan

Population (2016)
  - Total: 156
- Time zone: UTC+3:30 (IRST)

Tall-e Hajj Now Shad (Persian: تل حاج نوشاد) (Note: Also romanized as Tall-e Ḩājj Now Shād) is a village in Anarestan Rural District of Riz District in Jam County, Bushehr province, Iran.

== Demographics ==
=== Population ===
At the time of the 2006 National Census, the village's population was 152 in 33 households. The following census in 2011 counted 133 people in 35 households. The 2016 census measured the population of the village as 156 people in 43 households.
