= Zaki Alamdari =

Zaki Alamdari ذكي علمداري
- Village
- Country: Iran
- Province: Bushehr
- County: Jam
- Bakhsh: Central
- Rural District: Jam

Population (2006)
  - Total: 35
- Time zone: UTC+3:30 (IRST)
  - Summer (DST): UTC+4:30 (IRDT)

Zaki Alamdari (Persian: ذكي علمداري, also Romanized as Ẕaḵī ʿAlmdārī) is a village in Jam Rural District, in the Central District of Jam County, Bushehr Province, Iran. At the 2006 census, its population was 35, in 8 families.
