= Bas-e Malakhi =

Village in Bushehr province, Iran

Bas-e Malakhi Persian: بس ملخي
- Village
- Location within Iran
- Country: Iran
- Province: Bushehr
- County: Jam
- District: Central
- Rural District: Jam

Population (2016)
  - Total: 1,058
- Time zone: UTC+3:30 (IRST)

Bas-e Malakhi (Persian: بس ملخي) (Note: Also romanized as Bas-e Malakhī; also known as Bast-e Malakhī) is a village in Jam Rural District of the Central District in Jam County, Bushehr province, Iran.

== Demographics ==
=== Population ===
At the time of the 2006 National Census, the village's population was 751 in 133 households. The following census in 2011 counted 1,004 people in 264 households. The 2016 census measured the population of the village as 1,058 people in 324 households.
