= Qasab, Iran =

Qasab قصاب
- Village
- Location within Iran
- Coordinates: 27°52′04″N 52°17′15″E
- Country: Iran
- Province: Bushehr
- County: Jam
- Bakhsh: Central
- Rural District: Jam

Population (2006)
  - Total: 41
- Time zone: UTC+3:30 (IRST)
  - Summer (DST): UTC+4:30 (IRDT)

Qasab (Persian: قصاب, also Romanized as Qaşāb and Qaşşāb; also known as Kaşşāb) is a village in Jam Rural District, in the Central District of Jam County, Bushehr Province, Iran. At the 2006 census, its population was 41, in 7 families.
