= Kuchu-ye Khorzehreh =

Kuchu-ye Khorzehreh كوچو خرزهره
- Village
- Country: Iran
- Province: Bushehr
- County: Jam
- Bakhsh: Central
- Rural District: Jam

Population (2006)
  - Total: 82
- Time zone: UTC+3:30 (IRST)
  - Summer (DST): UTC+4:30 (IRDT)

Kuchu-ye Khorzehreh (Persian: كوچو خرزهره, also Romanized as Kūchū-ye Khorzehreh) is a village in Jam Rural District, in the Central District of Jam County, Bushehr Province, Iran. At the 2006 census, its population was 82, in 14 families.
