= Baba Mobaraki =

Village in Bushehr province, Iran

Baba Mobaraki Persian: بابامباركي
- Village
- Location within Iran
- Coordinates: 27°51′23″N 52°17′24″E
- Country: Iran
- Province: Bushehr
- County: Jam
- District: Central
- Rural District: Jam

Population (2016)
  - Total: 840
- Time zone: UTC+3:30 (IRST)

Baba Mobaraki (Persian: بابامباركي) (Note: Also romanized as Bābā Mobārakī and Baba Mobarakī; also known as Bābā Mobārak, Bābā Mobārak Hongdān, and Bīrāheh) is a village in Jam Rural District of the Central District in Jam County, Bushehr province, Iran.

== Demographics ==
=== Population ===
At the time of the 2006 National Census, the village's population was 531 in 107 households. The following census in 2011 counted 698 people in 183 households. The 2016 census measured the population of the village as 840 people in 230 households.
