= Gadavi =

Gadavi گادوئي
- Village
- Location within Iran
- Coordinates: 28°52′00″N 51°14′20″E
- Country: Iran
- Province: Bushehr
- County: Tangestan
- Bakhsh: Central
- Rural District: Baghak

Population (2006)
  - Total: 185
- Time zone: UTC+3:30 (IRST)
  - Summer (DST): UTC+4:30 (IRDT)

Gadavi (Persian: گادوئي, also Romanized as Gādavī) is a village in Baghak Rural District, in the Central District of Tangestan County, Bushehr Province, Iran. At the 2006 census, its population was 185, in 44 families.
