= Kuhcher =

Kuhcher كوه چر
- Village
- Location within Iran
- Coordinates: 27°55′14″N 52°10′17″E
- Country: Iran
- Province: Bushehr
- County: Jam
- Bakhsh: Central
- Rural District: Kuri

Population (2006)
  - Total: 212
- Time zone: UTC+3:30 (IRST)
  - Summer (DST): UTC+4:30 (IRDT)

Kuhcher (Persian: كوه چر, also Romanized as Kūhcher; also known as Bonāy Hādy (Persian: بنائ هادئ) and Kachhor) is a village in Kuri Rural District, in the Central District of Jam County, Bushehr Province, Iran. At the 2006 census, its population was 212, in 46 families.
