= Hoseyn Sadani =

Hoseyn Sadani حسين سادني
- Village
- Country: Iran
- Province: Bushehr
- County: Tangestan
- Bakhsh: Central
- Rural District: Baghak

Population (2006)
  - Total: 179
- Time zone: UTC+3:30 (IRST)
  - Summer (DST): UTC+4:30 (IRDT)

Hoseyn Sadani (Persian: حسين سادني, also Romanized as Ḩoseyn Sādanī) is a village in Baghak Rural District, in the Central District of Tangestan County, Bushehr Province, Iran. At the 2006 census, its population was 179, in 37 families.
