= Molla Salemi =

Molla Salemi ملاسالمي
- Village
- Location within Iran
- Coordinates: 27°57′41″N 51°47′10″E
- Country: Iran
- Province: Bushehr
- County: Deyr
- Bakhsh: Central
- Rural District: Abdan

Population (2006)
  - Total: 103
- Time zone: UTC+3:30 (IRST)
  - Summer (DST): UTC+4:30 (IRDT)

Molla Salemi (Persian: ملاسالمي, also Romanized as Mollā Sālemī) is a village in Abdan Rural District, in the Central District of Deyr County, Bushehr Province, Iran. At the 2006 census, its population was 103, in 21 families.
