= Chahar Tol =

Chahar Tol چهارتل
- Village
- Location within Iran
- Coordinates: 28°53′20″N 51°10′12″E
- Country: Iran
- Province: Bushehr
- County: Tangestan
- Bakhsh: Central
- Rural District: Baghak

Population (2006)
  - Total: 33
- Time zone: UTC+3:30 (IRST)
  - Summer (DST): UTC+4:30 (IRDT)

Chahar Tol (Persian: چهارتل, also Romanized as Chahār Tol) is a village in Baghak Rural District, in the Central District of Tangestan County, Bushehr Province, Iran. At the 2006 census, its population was 33, in 9 families.
