= Nowkan, Bushehr =

Nowkan نوكن
- Village
- Location within Iran
- Coordinates: 28°01′00″N 51°51′00″E
- Country: Iran
- Province: Bushehr
- County: Deyr
- Bakhsh: Central
- Rural District: Abdan

Population (2006)
  - Total: 30
- Time zone: UTC+3:30 (IRST)
  - Summer (DST): UTC+4:30 (IRDT)

Nowkan (Persian: نوكن, also Romanized as Naukān) is a village in Abdan Rural District, in the Central District of Deyr County, Bushehr Province, Iran. At the 2006 census, its population was 30, in 6 families.
