= Do Tusuru =

Do Tusuru دوتوسورو
- Village
- Country: Iran
- Province: Bushehr
- County: Jam
- Bakhsh: Central
- Rural District: Kuri

Population (2006)
  - Total: 55
- Time zone: UTC+3:30 (IRST)
  - Summer (DST): UTC+4:30 (IRDT)

Do Tusuru (Persian: دوتوسورو, also Romanized as Do Tūsūrū) is a village in Kuri Rural District, in the Central District of Jam County, Bushehr Province, Iran. At the 2006 census, its population was 55, in 12 families.
