= Tal-e Reis =

Tal-e Reis تل رئيس
- Village
- Location within Iran
- Coordinates: 27°54′34″N 51°56′54″E
- Country: Iran
- Province: Bushehr
- County: Deyr
- Bakhsh: Central
- Rural District: Howmeh

Population (2006)
  - Total: 48
- Time zone: UTC+3:30 (IRST)
  - Summer (DST): UTC+4:30 (IRDT)

Tal-e Reis (Persian: تل رئيس, also Romanized as Tal-e Re’īs, Tol Ra’īs, and Tol-e Ra’īs; also known as Tolombeh-ye Ra’īsī) is a village in Howmeh Rural District, in the Central District of Deyr County, Bushehr Province, Iran. At the 2006 census, its population was 48, in 9 families.
