= Tang-e Man =

Village in Bushehr province, Iran

Tang-e Man Persian: تنگمان
- Village
- Location within Iran
- Coordinates: 27°58′50″N 52°08′40″E
- Country: Iran
- Province: Bushehr
- County: Jam
- District: Riz
- Rural District: Tashan

Population (2016)
  - Total: 864
- Time zone: UTC+3:30 (IRST)

Tang-e Man (Persian: تنگمان) (Note: Also romanized as Tang-e Mān; also known as Jamālābād) is a village in Tashan Rural District of Riz District in Jam County, Bushehr province, Iran.

== Demographics ==
=== Population ===
At the time of the 2006 National Census, the village's population was 694 in 144 households. The following census in 2011 counted 721 people in 175 households. The 2016 census measured the population of the village as 864 people in 254 households.
