= Cham-e Berkeh =

Cham-e Berkeh چم بركه
- Village
- Location within Iran
- Coordinates: 27°51′00″N 52°19′00″E
- Country: Iran
- Province: Bushehr
- County: Jam
- Bakhsh: Central
- Rural District: Jam

Population (2006)
  - Total: 23
- Time zone: UTC+3:30 (IRST)

Cham-e Berkeh (Persian: چم بركه) is a village in Jam Rural District, in the Central District of Jam County, Bushehr Province, Iran. At the 2006 census, its population was 23, in 6 families.
