= Suru, Bushehr =

Suru سورو
- Village
- Location within Iran
- Coordinates: 28°00′05″N 51°53′57″E
- Country: Iran
- Province: Bushehr
- County: Deyr
- Bakhsh: Central
- Rural District: Howmeh

Population (2006)
  - Total: 83
- Time zone: UTC+3:30 (IRST)
  - Summer (DST): UTC+4:30 (IRDT)

Suru (Persian: سورو, also Romanized as Sūrū; also known as Sorow) is a village in Howmeh Rural District, in the Central District of Deyr County, Bushehr Province, Iran. At the 2006 census, its population was 83, in 20 families.
