= Gachavi-ye Mozaffarabad =

Gachavi-ye Mozaffarabad گچوي مظفراباد
- Village
- Country: Iran
- Province: Bushehr
- County: Deyr
- Bakhsh: Central
- Rural District: Abdan

Population (2006)
  - Total: 47
- Time zone: UTC+3:30 (IRST)
  - Summer (DST): UTC+4:30 (IRDT)

Gachavi-ye Mozaffarabad (Persian: گچوي مظفراباد, also Romanized as Gachavī-ye Moz̧affarābād) is a village in Abdan Rural District, in the Central District of Deyr County, Bushehr Province, Iran. At the 2006 census, its population was 47, in 9 families.
