= Malgah =

Malgah مل گاه
- Village
- Location within Iran
- Coordinates: 28°04′07″N 51°45′08″E
- Country: Iran
- Province: Bushehr
- County: Deyr
- Bakhsh: Central
- Rural District: Abdan

Population (2006)
  - Total: 123
- Time zone: UTC+3:30 (IRST)
  - Summer (DST): UTC+4:30 (IRDT)

Malgah (Persian: مل گاه, also Romanized as Malgāh; also known as Malgeh) is a village in Abdan Rural District, in the Central District of Deyr County, Bushehr Province, Iran. At the 2006 census, its population was 123, in 22 families.
