= Hermeyak =

Hermeyak حرميك
- Village
- Location within Iran
- Coordinates: 28°00′07″N 52°11′37″E
- Country: Iran
- Province: Bushehr
- County: Jam
- Bakhsh: Riz
- Rural District: Tashan

Population (2006)
  - Total: 153
- Time zone: UTC+3:30 (IRST)
  - Summer (DST): UTC+4:30 (IRDT)

Hermeyak (Persian: حرميك, also Romanized as Ḩermeyak, Harmīk, Ḩarm-e Yak, and Ḩermīak; also known as Charmek) is a village in Tashan Rural District, Riz District, Jam County, Bushehr Province, Iran. At the 2006 census, its population was 153, in 34 families.
