= Bazui =

Village in Bushehr province, Iran

Bazui Persian: بازوئي
- Village
- Location within Iran
- Coordinates: 28°56′29″N 51°16′31″E
- Country: Iran
- Province: Bushehr
- County: Tangestan
- District: Central
- Rural District: Ahram

Population (2016)
  - Total: 1,344
- Time zone: UTC+3:30 (IRST)

Bazui (Persian: بازوئي) (Note: Also romanized as Bāzū’ī; also known as Bārū’ī and Bāzūhā) is a village in, and the capital of, Ahram Rural District in the Central District of Tangestan County, Bushehr province, Iran.

== Demographics ==
=== Population ===
At the time of the 2006 National Census, the village's population was 1,140 in 265 households. The following census in 2011 counted 1,212 people in 350 households. The 2016 census measured the population of the village as 1,344 people in 395 households. It was the most populous village in its rural district.
