= Zaer Abbas =

Zaer Abbas زايرعباس
- Village
- Location within Iran
- Coordinates: 28°31′58″N 51°16′27″E
- Country: Iran
- Province: Bushehr
- County: Dashti
- Bakhsh: Central
- Rural District: Khvormuj

Population (2006)
  - Total: 46
- Time zone: UTC+3:30 (IRST)
  - Summer (DST): UTC+4:30 (IRDT)

Zaer Abbas (Persian: زايرعباس, also Romanized as Zā’er ‘Abbās; also known as Zā’er ‘Abbāsī) is a village in Khvormuj Rural District, in the Central District of Dashti County, Bushehr Province, Iran. At the 2006 census, its population was 46, in 18 families.
