= Tang-e Nakhl =

Tang-e Nakhl تنگ نخل
- Village
- Location within Iran
- Coordinates: 28°10′30″N 51°49′09″E
- Country: Iran
- Province: Bushehr
- County: Deyr
- Bakhsh: Central
- Rural District: Abdan

Population (2006)
  - Total: 18
- Time zone: UTC+3:30 (IRST)
  - Summer (DST): UTC+4:30 (IRDT)

Tang-e Nakhl (Persian: تنگ نخل) is a village in Abdan Rural District, in the Central District of Deyr County, Bushehr Province, Iran. At the 2006 census, its population was 18 in 5 families.
