= Nar-e Kuh =

Nar-e Kuh نركو
- Village
- Location within Iran
- Coordinates: 27°54′48″N 51°33′53″E
- Country: Iran
- Province: Bushehr
- County: Deyr
- Bakhsh: Bord Khun
- Rural District: Bord Khun

Population (2006)
  - Total: 21
- Time zone: UTC+3:30 (IRST)
  - Summer (DST): UTC+4:30 (IRDT)

Nar-e Kuh (Persian: نركو, also Romanized as Nar-e Kūh and Narakūh; also known as Marakūh and Narakū) is a village in Bord Khun Rural District, Bord Khun District, Deyr County, Bushehr Province, Iran. At the 2006 census, its population was 21, in 6 families.
