= Cham Darreh =

Cham Darreh چم دره
- village
- Location within Iran
- Coordinates: 27°51′38″N 52°15′58″E
- Country: Iran
- Province: Bushehr
- County: Jam
- Bakhsh: Central
- Rural District: Jam

Population (2006)
  - Total: 165
- Time zone: UTC+3:30 (IRST)

Cham Darreh (Persian: چم دره) is a village in Jam Rural District, in the Central District of Jam County, Bushehr Province, Iran. At the 2006 census, its population was 165, in 34 families.
