= Bonay-ye Rashed =

Village in Bushehr province, Iran

Bonay-ye Rashed Persian: بناي راشد
- Village
- Location within Iran
- Coordinates: 27°55′28″N 51°57′13″E
- Country: Iran
- Province: Bushehr
- County: Deyr
- District: Central
- Rural District: Howmeh

Population (2016)
  - Total: 107
- Time zone: UTC+3:30 (IRST)

Bonay-ye Rashed (Persian: بناي راشد) (Note: Also romanized as Bonāy-ye Rāshed; also known as Bāgh-e Rāshed and Band-e Rāshed) is a village in Howmeh Rural District of the Central District in Deyr County, Bushehr province, Iran.

== Demographics ==
=== Population ===
At the time of the 2006 National Census, the village's population was 105 in 18 households. The following census in 2011 counted 96 people in 21 households. The 2016 census measured the population of the village as 107 people in 30 households.
