= Kabgan =

Kabgan كبگان
- Village
- Location within Iran
- Coordinates: 28°12′15″N 51°19′02″E
- Country: Iran
- Province: Bushehr
- County: Dashti
- Bakhsh: Kaki
- Rural District: Kabgan

Population (2006)
  - Total: 231
- Time zone: UTC+3:30 (IRST)
  - Summer (DST): UTC+4:30 (IRDT)

Kabgan (Persian: كبگان, also Romanized as Kabgān; also known as Kābghān, Kabkān, and Kapkan) is a village in Kabgan Rural District, Kaki District, Dashti County, Bushehr Province, Iran. At the 2006 census, its population was 231, in 59 families.
