= Cham-e Shahab =

Cham-e Shahab چم شهاب
- Village
- Location within Iran
- Coordinates: 29°38′29″N 50°33′04″E
- Country: Iran
- Province: Bushehr
- County: Ganaveh
- Bakhsh: Central
- Rural District: Hayat Davud

Population (2006)
  - Total: 130
- Time zone: UTC+3:30 (IRST)
  - Summer (DST): UTC+4:30 (IRDT)

Cham-e Shahab (Persian: چم شهاب, also Romanized as Cham-e Shahāb and Cham Shahab) is a village in Hayat Davud Rural District, in the Central District of Ganaveh County, Bushehr Province, Iran. At the 2006 census, its population was 130, in 30 families.
