= Gonjeshki =

Gonjeshki گنجشكي
- Village
- Location within Iran
- Coordinates: 29°38′33″N 50°37′41″E
- Country: Iran
- Province: Bushehr
- County: Ganaveh
- Bakhsh: Central
- Rural District: Hayat Davud

Population (2006)
  - Total: 50
- Time zone: UTC+3:30 (IRST)
  - Summer (DST): UTC+4:30 (IRDT)

Gonjeshki (Persian: گنجشكي, also Romanized as Gonjeshkī, meaning "sparrow-like") is a village in Hayat Davud Rural District, in the Central District of Ganaveh County, Bushehr Province, Iran. At the 2006 census, its population was 50, in 16 families.
