= Ali Changi =

Ali Changi عالي چنگي
- Village
- Location within Iran
- Coordinates: 28°57′23″N 51°03′42″E
- Country: Iran
- Province: Bushehr
- County: Tangestan
- Bakhsh: Delvar
- Rural District: Delvar
- Elevation: 16 m (52 ft)

Population (2016)
  - Total: 693
- Time zone: UTC+3:30 (IRST)
  - Summer (DST): UTC+4:30 (IRDT)

Ali Changi (Persian: عالي چنگي, also Romanized as ‘Ālī Changī; also known as Ali Chagi and Ālī Jangī) is a village in Delvar Rural District, Delvar District, Tangestan County, Bushehr Province, Iran. At the 2016 census, its population was 693, in 205 families.
