= Maqatel =

Maqatel مقاتل
- Village
- Location within Iran
- Coordinates: 28°25′19″N 51°19′49″E
- Country: Iran
- Province: Bushehr
- County: Dashti
- Bakhsh: Kaki
- Rural District: Cheghapur

Population (2006)
  - Total: 17
- Time zone: UTC+3:30 (IRST)
  - Summer (DST): UTC+4:30 (IRDT)

Maqatel (Persian: مقاتل, also Romanized as Maqātel and Moqātel) is a village in Cheghapur Rural District, Kaki District, Dashti County, Bushehr Province, Iran. At the 2006 census, its population was 17, in 6 families.
