= Dargu Shomali =

Dargu Shomali درگوشمالي
- Village
- Location within Iran
- Coordinates: 28°24′00″N 51°39′06″E
- Country: Iran
- Province: Bushehr
- County: Dashti
- Bakhsh: Kaki
- Rural District: Cheghapur

Population (2006)
  - Total: 53
- Time zone: UTC+3:30 (IRST)
  - Summer (DST): UTC+4:30 (IRDT)

Dargu Shomali (Persian: درگوشمالي, also Romanized as Dargū Shomālī; also known as Dargoo, Dargu, and Darkū-ye Shemālī) is a village in Cheghapur Rural District, Kaki District, Dashti County, Bushehr Province, Iran. At the 2006 census, its population was 53, in 9 families.
