= Mal-e Gap =

Mal-e Gap مل گپ
- Village
- Location within Iran
- Coordinates: 28°48′26″N 51°04′39″E
- Country: Iran
- Province: Bushehr
- County: Tangestan
- Bakhsh: Delvar
- Rural District: Delvar

Population (2006)
  - Total: 321
- Time zone: UTC+3:30 (IRST)
  - Summer (DST): UTC+4:30 (IRDT)

Mal-e Gap (Persian: مل گپ) is a village in Delvar Rural District, Delvar District, Tangestan County, Bushehr Province, Iran. At the 2006 census, its population was 321, in 79 families.
