= Azhdar Khowsh =

Azhdar Khowsh اژدرخوس
- Village
- Location within Iran
- Coordinates: 28°29′56″N 51°49′38″E
- Country: Iran
- Province: Bushehr
- County: Dashti
- Bakhsh: Shonbeh and Tasuj
- Rural District: Tasuj

Population (2006)
  - Total: 52
- Time zone: UTC+3:30 (IRST)
  - Summer (DST): UTC+4:30 (IRDT)

Azhdar Khowsh (Persian: اژدرخوس) is a village in Tasuj Rural District, Shonbeh and Tasuj District, Dashti County, Bushehr Province, Iran. At the 2006 census, its population was 52, in 13 families.
