= Sohu, Iran =

Sohu سهو
- Village
- Location within Iran
- Coordinates: 28°34′51″N 51°42′50″E
- Country: Iran
- Province: Bushehr
- County: Dashti
- Bakhsh: Shonbeh and Tasuj
- Rural District: Tasuj

Population (2006)
  - Total: 42
- Time zone: UTC+3:30 (IRST)
  - Summer (DST): UTC+4:30 (IRDT)

Sohu (Persian: سهو, also Romanized as Sohū; also known as Sahe, Sehu, and Sohūk) is a village in Tasuj Rural District, Shonbeh and Tasuj District, Dashti County, Bushehr Province, Iran. At the 2006 census, its population was 42.
