= Eslamabad, Dashti =

Eslamabad اسلام اباد
- Village
- Location within Iran
- Coordinates: 28°20′56″N 51°48′32″E
- Country: Iran
- Province: Bushehr
- County: Dashti
- Bakhsh: Shonbeh and Tasuj
- Rural District: Shonbeh

Population (2006)
  - Total: 59
- Time zone: UTC+3:30 (IRST)
  - Summer (DST): UTC+4:30 (IRDT)

Eslamabad (Persian: اسلام اباد) (Note: Also romanized as Eslāmābād; formerly known as Ablahan (ابلهان)) is a village in Shonbeh Rural District, Shonbeh and Tasuj District, Dashti County, Bushehr Province, Iran. At the 2006 census, its population was 59, in 13 families.
