= Tol-e Tall =

Tol-e Tall تل تل
- Village
- Location within Iran
- Coordinates: 29°39′17″N 50°33′09″E
- Country: Iran
- Province: Bushehr
- County: Ganaveh
- Bakhsh: Central
- Rural District: Hayat Davud

Population (2006)
  - Total: 170
- Time zone: UTC+3:30 (IRST)
  - Summer (DST): UTC+4:30 (IRDT)

Tol-e Tall (Persian: تل تل, also Romanized as Toltal) is a village in Hayat Davud Rural District, in the Central District of Ganaveh County, Bushehr Province, Iran. At the 2006 census, its population was 170, in 37 families.
