= Gomarun =

Gomarun گمارون
- Village
- Location within Iran
- Coordinates: 29°41′13″N 50°39′18″E
- Country: Iran
- Province: Bushehr
- County: Ganaveh
- Bakhsh: Central
- Rural District: Hayat Davud

Population (2006)
  - Total: 261
- Time zone: UTC+3:30 (IRST)
  - Summer (DST): UTC+4:30 (IRDT)

Gomarun (Persian: گمارون, also Romanized as Gomārūn; also known as Gamarān, Gomārān, and Gumārūn) is a village in Hayat Davud Rural District, in the Central District of Ganaveh County, Bushehr Province, Iran. At the 2006 census, its population was 261, in 60 families.
