= Mohammad Riz =

Mohammad Riz محمدريز
- Village
- Location within Iran
- Coordinates: 28°31′25″N 51°46′24″E
- Country: Iran
- Province: Bushehr
- County: Dashti
- Bakhsh: Shonbeh and Tasuj
- Rural District: Tasuj

Population (2006)
  - Total: 29
- Time zone: UTC+3:30 (IRST)
  - Summer (DST): UTC+4:30 (IRDT)

Mohammad Riz (Persian: محمدريز, also Romanized as Moḩammad Rīz; also known as Mamrīz) is a village in Tasuj Rural District, Shonbeh and Tasuj District, Dashti County, Bushehr Province, Iran. At the 2006 census, its population was 29, in 5 families.
