= Salemabad =

Salemabad سالم اباد
- Village
- Location within Iran
- Coordinates: 28°26′33″N 51°07′43″E
- Country: Iran
- Province: Bushehr
- County: Tangestan
- Bakhsh: Delvar
- Rural District: Bu ol Kheyr

Population (2006)
  - Total: 455
- Time zone: UTC+3:30 (IRST)
  - Summer (DST): UTC+4:30 (IRDT)

Salemabad (Persian: سالم اباد, also Romanized as Sālemābād; also known as Sālem Ābādeh, Salīm Ābād, and Salim Abadeh) is a village in Bu ol Kheyr Rural District, Delvar District, Tangestan County, Bushehr Province, Iran. At the 2006 census, its population was 455, in 108 families.
