= Khish Eshkan =

Khish Eshkan خيش اشكن
- Village
- Location within Iran
- Coordinates: 28°55′26″N 51°02′04″E
- Country: Iran
- Province: Bushehr
- County: Tangestan
- Bakhsh: Delvar
- Rural District: Delvar

Population (2006)
  - Total: 338
- Time zone: UTC+3:30 (IRST)
  - Summer (DST): UTC+4:30 (IRDT)

Khish Eshkan (Persian: خيش اشكن, also Romanized as Khīsh Eshkan; also known as Khvīsh Eshkan) is a village in Delvar Rural District, Delvar District, Tangestan County, Bushehr Province, Iran. At the 2006 census, its population was 338, in 82 families.
