= Tavil Deraz =

Tavil Deraz طويل دراز
- Village
- Location within Iran
- Coordinates: 28°21′10″N 51°22′06″E
- Country: Iran
- Province: Bushehr
- County: Dashti
- Bakhsh: Kaki
- Rural District: Cheghapur

Population (2006)
  - Total: 33
- Time zone: UTC+3:30 (IRST)
  - Summer (DST): UTC+4:30 (IRDT)

Tavil Deraz (Persian: طويل دراز, also Romanized as Ţavīl Derāz; also known as Tavez Darāz and Tūz Devāz) is a village in Cheghapur Rural District, Kaki District, Dashti County, Bushehr Province, Iran. At the 2006 census, its population was 33, in 9 families.
