= Bujik Do =

Bujik Do بوجيكدو
- Village
- Location within Iran
- Coordinates: 28°38′37″N 51°04′39″E
- Country: Iran
- Province: Bushehr
- County: Tangestan
- Bakhsh: Delvar
- Rural District: Bu ol Kheyr

Population (2006)
  - Total: 63
- Time zone: UTC+3:30 (IRST)
  - Summer (DST): UTC+4:30 (IRDT)

Bujik Do (Persian: بوجيكدو, also Romanized as Būjīk Do; also known as Būjīkdān) is a village in Bu ol Kheyr Rural District, Delvar District, Tangestan County, Bushehr Province, Iran. At the 2006 census, its population was 63, in 14 families.
