= Taj Maleki =

Taj Maleki تاج ملكي
- Village
- Location within Iran
- Coordinates: 29°46′02″N 50°33′50″E
- Country: Iran
- Province: Bushehr
- County: Ganaveh
- Bakhsh: Central
- Rural District: Hayat Davud

Population (2006)
  - Total: 32
- Time zone: UTC+3:30 (IRST)
  - Summer (DST): UTC+4:30 (IRDT)

Taj Maleki (Persian: تاج ملكي, also Romanized as Tāj Malekī and Tāj-e Malekī) is a village in Hayat Davud Rural District, in the Central District of Ganaveh County, Bushehr Province, Iran. At the 2006 census, its population was 32, in 10 families.
