= Hadakan =

Hadakan هدكان
- Village
- Location within Iran
- Coordinates: 28°21′39″N 51°10′37″E
- Country: Iran
- Province: Bushehr
- County: Tangestan
- Bakhsh: Delvar
- Rural District: Bu ol Kheyr

Population (2006)
  - Total: 136
- Time zone: UTC+3:30 (IRST)
  - Summer (DST): UTC+4:30 (IRDT)

Hadakan (Persian: هدكان, also Romanized as Hadakān and Hadkān; also known as Hada Ku and Hadakuh) is a village in Bu ol Kheyr Rural District, Delvar District, Tangestan County, Bushehr Province, Iran. At the 2006 census, its population was 136, in 29 families.
