= Sheykhian Mari =

Sheykhian Mari شيخيان ماري
- Village
- Location within Iran
- Coordinates: 28°17′57″N 51°25′16″E
- Country: Iran
- Province: Bushehr
- County: Dashti
- Bakhsh: Kaki
- Rural District: Kabgan

Population (2006)
  - Total: 222
- Time zone: UTC+3:30 (IRST)
  - Summer (DST): UTC+4:30 (IRDT)

Sheykhian Mari (Persian: شيخيان ماري, also Romanized as Sheykhīān Mārī; also known as Sheykheyān, Sheykhīān, and Sheykhīyan) is a village in Kabgan Rural District, Kaki District, Dashti County, Bushehr Province, Iran. At the 2006 census, its population was 222, in 48 families.
