= Hana Shur =

Hana Shur حناشور
- Village
- Location within Iran
- Coordinates: 28°25′27″N 51°55′01″E
- Country: Iran
- Province: Bushehr
- County: Dashti
- Bakhsh: Shonbeh and Tasuj
- Rural District: Tasuj

Population (2006)
  - Total: 216
- Time zone: UTC+3:30 (IRST)
  - Summer (DST): UTC+4:30 (IRDT)

Hana Shur (Persian: حناشور, also Romanized as Ḩanā Shūr; also known as Hina Shūr, Hīneh Shūr, Hinshoor, and Honīshūr) is a village in Tasuj Rural District, Shonbeh and Tasuj District, Dashti County, Bushehr Province, Iran. At the 2006 census, its population was 216, in 49 families.
