= Zir Ahak =

Zir Ahak زيراهك
- Village
- Location within Iran
- Coordinates: 28°17′34″N 51°13′43″E
- Country: Iran
- Province: Bushehr
- County: Tangestan
- Bakhsh: Delvar
- Rural District: Bu ol Kheyr

Population (2006)
  - Total: 138
- Time zone: UTC+3:30 (IRST)
  - Summer (DST): UTC+4:30 (IRDT)

Zir Ahak (Persian: زيراهك, also Romanized as Zīr Āhak; also known as Zāyer, Zīrak, Zīrehak, Zīrehat, Zīreh Hak, Zirhak, and Zīr Rāh) is a village in Bu ol Kheyr Rural District, Delvar District, Tangestan County, Bushehr Province, Iran. At the 2006 census, its population was 138, in 34 families.
