= Gashui =

Gashui گشويي
- Village
- Location within Iran
- Coordinates: 29°33′15″N 50°32′55″E
- Country: Iran
- Province: Bushehr
- County: Ganaveh
- Bakhsh: Central
- Rural District: Hayat Davud

Population (2006)
  - Total: 159
- Time zone: UTC+3:30 (IRST)
  - Summer (DST): UTC+4:30 (IRDT)

Gashui (Persian: گشويي, also Romanized as Gashū’ī; also known as Kashoo’i and Kashū’ī) is a village in Hayat Davud Rural District, in the Central District of Ganaveh County, Bushehr Province, Iran. At the 2006 census, its population was 159, in 30 families.
