= Tall Borj =

Tall Borj تل برج
- Village
- Location within Iran
- Coordinates: 29°42′35″N 50°30′51″E
- Country: Iran
- Province: Bushehr
- County: Ganaveh
- Bakhsh: Central
- Rural District: Hayat Davud

Population (2006)
  - Total: 43
- Time zone: UTC+3:30 (IRST)
  - Summer (DST): UTC+4:30 (IRDT)

Tall Borj (Persian: تل برج, also Romanized as Tāl Borj) is a village in Hayat Davud Rural District, in the Central District of Ganaveh County, Bushehr Province, Iran. At the 2006 census, its population was 43, in 7 families.
