= Razmabad =

Razmabad رزم اباد
- Village
- Location within Iran
- Coordinates: 28°27′46″N 51°38′20″E
- Country: Iran
- Province: Bushehr
- County: Dashti
- Bakhsh: Shonbeh and Tasuj
- Rural District: Shonbeh

Population (2006)
  - Total: 29
- Time zone: UTC+3:30 (IRST)
  - Summer (DST): UTC+4:30 (IRDT)

Razmabad (Persian: رزم اباد, also Romanized as Razmābād) is a village in Shonbeh Rural District, Shonbeh and Tasuj District, Dashti County, Bushehr Province, Iran. At the 2006 census, its population was 29, in 6 families.
