= Mazar Hoseyni =

Mazar Hoseyni مزارحسيني
- Village
- Location within Iran
- Coordinates: 28°55′36″N 51°02′18″E
- Country: Iran
- Province: Bushehr
- County: Tangestan
- Bakhsh: Delvar
- Rural District: Delvar

Population (2006)
  - Total: 311
- Time zone: UTC+3:30 (IRST)
  - Summer (DST): UTC+4:30 (IRDT)

Mazar Hoseyni (Persian: مزارحسيني, also Romanized as Mazār Ḩoseynī) is a village in Delvar Rural District, Delvar District, Tangestan County, Bushehr Province, Iran. At the 2006 census, its population was 311, in 70 families.
