= Maleh-ye Khorg =

Maleh-ye Khorg مله خرگ
- Village
- Country: Iran
- Province: Bushehr
- County: Dashti
- Bakhsh: Kaki
- Rural District: Cheghapur

Population (2006)
  - Total: 39
- Time zone: UTC+3:30 (IRST)
  - Summer (DST): UTC+4:30 (IRDT)

Maleh-ye Khorg (Persian: مله خرگ) is a village in Cheghapur Rural District, Kaki District, Dashti County, Bushehr Province, Iran. At the 2006 census, its population was 39, in 10 families.
