= Fakhr Avari =

Fakhr Avari فخراوري
- Village
- Location within Iran
- Coordinates: 29°41′29″N 50°36′45″E
- Country: Iran
- Province: Bushehr
- County: Ganaveh
- Bakhsh: Central
- Rural District: Hayat Davud

Population (2006)
  - Total: 413
- Time zone: UTC+3:30 (IRST)
  - Summer (DST): UTC+4:30 (IRDT)

Fakhr Avari (Persian: فخراوري, also Romanized as Fakhr Āvarī and Fakhr Averi; also known as Fahrīār and Fahriyāri) is a village in Hayat Davud Rural District, in the Central District of Ganaveh County, Bushehr Province, Iran. At the 2006 census, its population was 413, in 91 families.
