= Kardaneh =

Kardeneh كاردنه
- Village
- Location within Iran
- Coordinates: 28°33′36″N 51°39′41″E
- Country: Iran
- Province: Bushehr
- County: Dashti
- Bakhsh: Shonbeh and Tasuj
- Rural District: Shonbeh

Population (2006)
  - Total: 57
- Time zone: UTC+3:30 (IRST)
  - Summer (DST): UTC+4:30 (IRDT)

Kardeneh (Persian: كاردنه, also Romanized as kardeneh; also known as kardeneh ) is a village in Shonbeh Rural District, Shonbeh and Tasuj District, Dashti County, Bushehr Province, Iran. At the 2006 census, its population was 57, in 12 families.
