= Milak, Ganaveh =

Milak ميلك
- Village
- Location within Iran
- Coordinates: 29°34′51″N 51°07′24″E
- Country: Iran
- Province: Bushehr
- County: Ganaveh
- Bakhsh: Central
- Rural District: Hayat Davud

Population (2006)
  - Total: 33
- Time zone: UTC+3:30 (IRST)
  - Summer (DST): UTC+4:30 (IRDT)

Milak (Persian: ميلك, also Romanized as Mīlak) is a village in Hayat Davud Rural District, in the Central District of Ganaveh County, Bushehr Province, Iran. At the 2006 census, its population was 33, in 5 families.
