= Mal-e Mohammad Abdal Ali =

Mal-e Mohammad Abdal Ali مال محمدعبدالعلي
- Village
- Location within Iran
- Coordinates: 29°46′07″N 50°32′49″E
- Country: Iran
- Province: Bushehr
- County: Ganaveh
- Bakhsh: Central
- Rural District: Hayat Davud

Population (2006)
  - Total: 37
- Time zone: UTC+3:30 (IRST)
  - Summer (DST): UTC+4:30 (IRDT)

Mal-e Mohammad Abdal Ali (Persian: مال محمدعبدالعلي, also Romanized as Māl-e Moḩammad ʿAbdāl ʿAlī; also known as Mal Mohammad Abd Ali, Māl-e ‘Abd ‘Alī, Māl-e Moḩammad, and Moḩammad ‘Abd ‘Alī) is a village in Hayat Davud Rural District, in the Central District of Ganaveh County, Bushehr Province, Iran. At the 2006 census, its population was 37, in 9 families.
