= Dumiti =

Dumiti دوميتي
- Village
- Location within Iran
- Coordinates: 27°50′41″N 52°18′55″E
- Country: Iran
- Province: Bushehr
- County: Jam
- Bakhsh: Central
- Rural District: Jam

Population (2006)
  - Total: 67
- Time zone: UTC+3:30 (IRST)

Dumiti (Persian: دوميتي, also Romanized as Dūmītī; also known as Dīmītī) is a village in Jam Rural District, in the Central District of Jam County, Bushehr Province, Iran. At the 2006 census, its population was 67, in 16 families.
