= Rostami, Delvar =

Rostami رستمي
- Village
- Location within Iran
- Coordinates: 28°51′37″N 51°02′46″E
- Country: Iran
- Province: Bushehr
- County: Tangestan
- Bakhsh: Delvar
- Rural District: Delvar

Population (2006)
  - Total: 153
- Time zone: UTC+3:30 (IRST)
  - Summer (DST): UTC+4:30 (IRDT)

Rostami (Persian: رستمي, also Romanized as Rostamī; also known as Rostamī Jān, Rustaini, and Rustami) is a village in Delvar Rural District, Delvar District, Tangestan County, Bushehr Province, Iran. At the 2006 census, its population was 153, in 38 families.
