= Dehdari, Bushehr =

Dehdari دهداري
- Village
- Location within Iran
- Coordinates: 28°26′15″N 51°26′34″E
- Country: Iran
- Province: Bushehr
- County: Dashti
- Bakhsh: Kaki
- Rural District: Cheghapur

Population (2006)
  - Total: 127
- Time zone: UTC+3:30 (IRST)
  - Summer (DST): UTC+4:30 (IRDT)

Dehdari (Persian: دهداري, also Romanized as Dehdārī) is a village in Cheghapur Rural District, Kaki District, Dashti County, Bushehr Province, Iran. At the 2006 census, its population was 127, in 29 families.
