= Dalaram =

Dalaram دلارام
- Village
- Interactive map of Dalaram
- Coordinates: 28°39′52″N 51°04′32″E
- Country: Iran
- Province: Bushehr
- County: Tangestan
- Bakhsh: Delvar
- Rural District: Delvar

Population (2006)
  - Total: 29
- Time zone: UTC+3:30 (IRST)
  - Summer (DST): UTC+4:30 (IRDT)

Dalaram (Persian: دلارام, also Romanized as Dalārām; also known as Dalāramdy) is a village in Delvar Rural District, Delvar District, Tangestan County, Bushehr Province, Iran. At the 2006 census, its population was 29, in 7 families.
