= Marhavay =

Marhavay مرحواي
- Village
- Location within Iran
- Coordinates: 28°26′36″N 51°28′24″E
- Country: Iran
- Province: Bushehr
- County: Dashti
- Bakhsh: Kaki
- Rural District: Cheghapur

Population (2006)
  - Total: 37
- Time zone: UTC+3:30 (IRST)
  - Summer (DST): UTC+4:30 (IRDT)

Marhavay (Persian: مرحواي, also Romanized as Marḩavāy; also known as Marḩabā'ī) is a village in Cheghapur Rural District, Kaki District, Dashti County, Bushehr Province, Iran.

== Population ==
At the 2006 census, its population was 37, in 7 families.
