= Kalat, Dashti =

Coordinates: 27°27′34″N 52°43′58″E

Kalat كلات
- Village
- Interactive map of Kalat
- Country: Iran
- Province: Bushehr
- County: Dashti
- Bakhsh: Kaki
- Rural District: Kabgan

Population (2006)
  - Total: 44
- Time zone: UTC+3:30 (IRST)
  - Summer (DST): UTC+4:30 (IRDT)

Kalat (Persian: كلات, also Romanized as Kalāt) is a village in Kabgan Rural District, Kaki District, Dashti County, Bushehr Province, Iran. At the 2006 census, its population was 44, in 10 families.
