= Mal Sanan =

Mal Sanan مال سنان
- Village
- Location within Iran
- Coordinates: 29°56′06″N 50°20′18″E
- Country: Iran
- Province: Bushehr
- County: Deylam
- Bakhsh: Imam Hassan
- Rural District: Liravi-ye Jonubi

Population (2006)
  - Total: 87
- Time zone: UTC+3:30 (IRST)
  - Summer (DST): UTC+4:30 (IRDT)

Mal Sanan (Persian: مال سنان, also Romanized as Māl Sanān and Māl Senān; also known as Mala-i-Sana and Māl Saneh) is a village in Liravi-ye Jonubi Rural District, Imam Hassan District, Deylam County, Bushehr Province, Iran. At the 2006 census, its population was 87, in 21 families.
