= Khvajeh Gir =

Khvajeh Gir خواجه گير
- Village
- Location within Iran
- Coordinates: 30°00′55″N 50°16′47″E
- Country: Iran
- Province: Bushehr
- County: Deylam
- Bakhsh: Central
- Rural District: Liravi-ye Shomali

Population (2006)
  - Total: 123
- Time zone: UTC+3:30 (IRST)
  - Summer (DST): UTC+4:30 (IRDT)

Khvajeh Gir (Persian: خواجه گير, also Romanized as Khvājeh Gīr) is a village in Liravi-ye Shomali Rural District, in the Central District of Deylam County, Bushehr Province, Iran. As of the 2006 census, its population was 123, in 23 families.
