= Bovirat =

Bovirat بويرات
- Village
- Location within Iran
- Coordinates: 29°58′39″N 50°13′31″E
- Country: Iran
- Province: Bushehr
- County: Deylam
- Bakhsh: Central
- Rural District: Liravi-ye Shomali

Population (2006)
  - Total: 51
- Time zone: UTC+3:30 (IRST)
  - Summer (DST): UTC+4:30 (IRDT)

Bovirat (Persian: بويرات, also Romanized as Bovīrāt and Boveyrāt) is a village in Liravi-ye Shomali Rural District, in the Central District of Deylam County, Bushehr Province, Iran. At the 2006 census, its population was 51, in 12 families.
