= Baharestan, Jam =

City in Bushehr province, Iran

Baharestan Persian: بهارستان
- City
- Location within Iran
- Coordinates: 27°50′21″N 52°20′57″E
- Country: Iran
- Province: Bushehr
- County: Jam
- District: Central
- Established as a city: 2019

Population (2016)
  - Total: 5,989
- Time zone: UTC+3:30 (IRST)

Baharestan (Persian: بهارستان) (Note: Formerly known as Do Lengeh (دولنگه)) is a city in the Central District of Jam County, Bushehr province, Iran.

== Demographics ==
=== Population ===
At the time of the 2006 National Census, Baharestan's population was 3,125 in 684 households, when it was a village in Jam Rural District. The following census in 2011 counted 3,667 people in 902 households. The 2016 census measured the population of the village as 5,989 people in 1,507 households. It was the most populous village in its rural district.

Baharestan was converted to a city in 2019.
