= Shirinak, Bushehr =

Shirinak شيرينك
- Village
- Location within Iran
- Coordinates: 29°46′51″N 50°19′11″E
- Country: Iran
- Province: Bushehr
- County: Deylam
- Bakhsh: Imam Hassan
- Rural District: Liravi-ye Jonubi

Population (2006)
  - Total: 10
- Time zone: UTC+3:30 (IRST)
  - Summer (DST): UTC+4:30 (IRDT)

Shirinak (Persian: شيرينك, also Romanized as Shīrīnak; also known as Shiroonak and Shīrūnak) is a village in Liravi-ye Jonubi Rural District, Imam Hassan District, Deylam County, Bushehr Province, Iran. At the 2006 census, its population was 10, in 4 families.
