= Mal-e Shamab =

Village in Liravi-ye Shomali Rural District

Mal-e Shamab مال شهاب
- Village
- Location within Iran
- Coordinates: 30°02′01″N 50°16′11″E
- Country: Iran
- Province: Bushehr
- County: Deylam
- Bakhsh: Central
- Rural District: Liravi-ye Shomali

Population (2006)
  - Total: 79
- Time zone: UTC+3:30 (IRST)
  - Summer (DST): UTC+4:30 (IRDT)

Mal-e Shamab (Persian: مال شهاب, also Romanized as Māl-e Shamāb; also known as Māl Shahāb) is a village in Liravi-ye Shomali Rural District, in the Central District of Deylam County, Bushehr Province, Iran. At the 2006 census, its population was 79, in 18 families.
