= Ommolkorm Island =

Uninhabited Iranian island in the Persian Gulf

- Location within Persian Gulf
- Interactive map of Ommolkorm Island

Geography
- Location: Persian Gulf
- Coordinates: 27.834°N 51.560°E
- Area: 10–12 km^{2} (3.9–4.6 sq mi)

Administration
- Iran

Ommolkorm Island (Also: Gorm, Ommolgorom) (Persian: جزیره ام الکرم, jazireye Ommolkorm) is an uninhabited Iranian island in the Persian Gulf. This Island has an area of some 10–12 km^{2}. It is surrounded by 14 km of sandy beaches suitable for marine turtle nesting although the southern and eastern parts are more heavily used, especially a stretch of 6–700 meters on the east coast used by Hawksbill sea turtles. The island is located southeast of Bushehr.
