= Mal Mir =

Mal Mir مال مير
- Village
- Country: Iran
- Province: Bushehr
- County: Deylam
- Bakhsh: Imam Hassan
- Rural District: Liravi-ye Jonubi

Population (2006)
  - Total: 61
- Time zone: UTC+3:30 (IRST)
  - Summer (DST): UTC+4:30 (IRDT)

Mal Mir (Persian: مال مير, also Romanized as Māl Mīr) is a village in Liravi-ye Johnnie Rural District, Imam Hass an District, Deylam Count, Bushehr Province, Iran. At the 2006 census, its population was 61, in 17 families.
