= Bu ol Fath =

Bu ol Fath بوالفتح
- Village
- Location within Iran
- Coordinates: 29°50′51″N 50°25′11″E
- Country: Iran
- Province: Bushehr
- County: Deylam
- Bakhsh: Imam Hassan
- Rural District: Liravi-ye Jonubi

Population (2006)
  - Total: 118
- Time zone: UTC+3:30 (IRST)
  - Summer (DST): UTC+4:30 (IRDT)

Bu ol Fath (Persian: بوالفتح, also Romanized as Bū ol Fatḩ; also known as Abolfatḩ, Abū ol Fatḩ, Boolfat-h, and Būl Fath) is a village in Liravi-ye Jonubi Rural District, Imam Hassan District, Deylam County, Bushehr Province, Iran. At the 2006 census, its population was 118, in 29 families.
