= Govabin =

Govabin گوابين
- Village
- Location within Iran
- Coordinates: 29°16′32″N 50°45′47″E
- Country: Iran
- Province: Bushehr
- County: Ganaveh
- Bakhsh: Rig
- Rural District: Rudhaleh

Population (2006)
  - Total: 344
- Time zone: UTC+3:30 (IRST)
  - Summer (DST): UTC+4:30 (IRDT)

Govabin (Persian: گوابين, also Romanized as Govābīn and Gavābīn; also known as Gavāpen and Kovābīn) is a village in Rudhaleh Rural District, Rig District, Ganaveh County, Bushehr Province, Iran. At the 2006 census, its population was 344, in 70 families.
