= Mozaffari-ye Jonubi =

Mozaffari-ye Jonubi مظفری جنوبی
- Village
- Location within Iran
- Coordinates: 29°59′46″N 50°22′11″E
- Country: Iran
- Province: Bushehr
- County: Deylam
- Bakhsh: Central
- Rural District: Liravi-ye Shomali

Population (2006)
  - Total: 17
- Time zone: UTC+3:30 (IRST)
  - Summer (DST): UTC+4:30 (IRDT)

Mozaffari-ye Jonubi (Persian: مظفری جنوبی, also Romanized as Moz̧affarī-ye Jonūbī; also known as Moz̧affarī) is a village in Liravi-ye Shomali Rural District, in the Central District of Deylam County, Bushehr Province, Iran. At the 2006 census, its population was 17, in 5 families.
