= Pars-e Jonubi-ye Do =

Pars-e Jonubi-ye Do پارس جنوبي 2
- Village
- Country: Iran
- Province: Bushehr
- County: Asaluyeh
- Bakhsh: Central
- Rural District: Asaluyeh

Population (2006)
  - Total: 14,006
- Time zone: UTC+3:30 (IRST)
  - Summer (DST): UTC+4:30 (IRDT)

Pars-e Jonubi-ye Do (Persian: پارس جنوبي 2, also Romanized as Pārs-e Jonūbī-ye Do) is a village in Central District, Asaluyeh County, Bushehr Province, Iran. At the 2006 census, its population was 14,006, in 952 families.
