= Pars-e Jonubi-ye Yek =

Pars-e Jonubi-ye Yek پارس جنوبي 1
- Village
- Country: Iran
- Province: Bushehr
- County: Asaluyeh
- Bakhsh: Central
- Rural District: Asaluyeh

Population (2006)
  - Total: 10,938
- Time zone: UTC+3:30 (IRST)
  - Summer (DST): UTC+4:30 (IRDT)

Pars-e Jonubi-ye Yek (Persian: پارس جنوبي 1, also Romanized as Pārs-e Jonūbī-ye Yek) is a village in Asaluyeh Rural District, Central District, Asaluyeh County, Bushehr Province, Iran. At the 2006 census, its population was 10,938, in 259 families.
