= Bord Khun Rural District =

Rural district in Bushehr province, Iran

Bord Khun Rural District Persian: دهستان بردخون
- Rural District
- Location within Iran
- Coordinates: 28°00′N 51°31′E
- Country: Iran
- Province: Bushehr
- County: Deyr
- District: Bord Khun
- Established: 1986
- Capital: Bord Khun

Population (2016)
  - Total: 1,428
- Time zone: UTC+3:30 (IRST)

Bord Khun Rural District (Persian: دهستان بردخون) is in Bord Khun District of Deyr County, Bushehr province, Iran. It is administered from the city of Bord Khun.

== Demographics ==
=== Population ===
At the time of the 2006 National Census, the rural district's population was 1,115 in 234 households. There were 1,160 inhabitants in 281 households at the following census of 2011. The 2016 census measured the population of the rural district as 1,428 in 394 households. The most populous of its 23 villages was Bord Khun-e Kohneh, with 826 people.

=== Other villages in the rural district ===
- Sajadiyeh
