= Central District (Dashti County) =

District in Bushehr province, Iran

Central District (Dashti County) Persian: بخش مرکزی شهرستان دشتی
- District
- Location within Iran
- Coordinates: 28°35′N 51°24′E
- Country: Iran
- Province: Bushehr
- County: Dashti
- Capital: Khvormuj

Population (2016)
  - Total: 51,625
- Time zone: UTC+3:30 (IRST)

The Central District of Dashti County (Persian: بخش مرکزی شهرستان دشتی) is in Bushehr province, Iran. Its capital is the city of Khvormuj.

== Demographics ==
=== Population ===
At the time of the 2006 National Census, the district's population was 41,179 in 9,155 households. The following census in 2011 counted 45,214 people in 11,600 households. The 2016 census measured the population of the district as 51,625 inhabitants living in 14,789 households.

=== Administrative divisions ===
Central District (Dashti County) Population
Administrative Divisions	2006	2011	2016
Khvormuj RD	4,181	4,486	4,549
Markazi RD	5,331	5,784	6,354
Khvormuj (city)	31,667	34,944	40,722
Total	41,179	45,214	51,625
RD = Rural District
