= Bord Khun District =

District in Bushehr province, Iran

Bord Khun District Persian: بخش بردخون
- District
- Location within Iran
- Coordinates: 28°02′09″N 51°30′29″E
- Country: Iran
- Province: Bushehr
- County: Deyr
- Capital: Bord Khun

Population (2016)
  - Total: 11,113
- Time zone: UTC+3:30 (IRST)

Bord Khun District (Persian: بخش بردخون) is in Deyr County, Bushehr province, Iran. Its capital is the city of Bord Khun.

== Demographics ==
=== Population ===
At the time of the 2006 National Census, the district's population was 9,369 in 1,941 households. The following census in 2011 counted 9,758 people in 2,429 households. The 2016 census measured the population of the district as 11,113 inhabitants living in 3,030 households.

=== Administrative divisions ===
Bord Khun District Population
Administrative Divisions	2006	2011	2016
Abkosh RD	3,954	4,222	4,352
Bord Khun RD	1,115	1,160	1,428
Bord Khun (city)	4,300	4,376	5,333
Total	9,369	9,758	11,113
RD = Rural District
