= Ahram Rural District =

Rural district in Bushehr province, Iran

Ahram Rural District Persian: دهستان اهرم
- Rural District
- Location within Iran
- Coordinates: 28°54′N 51°23′E
- Country: Iran
- Province: Bushehr
- County: Tangestan
- District: Central
- Established: 1986
- Capital: Bazui

Population (2016)
  - Total: 8,689
- Time zone: UTC+3:30 (IRST)

Ahram Rural District (Persian: دهستان اهرم) is in the Central District of Tangestan County, Bushehr province, Iran. Its capital is the village of Bazui.

== Demographics ==
=== Population ===
At the time of the 2006 National Census, the rural district's population was 10,990 in 2,621 households. There were 11,632 inhabitants in 3,152 households at the following census of 2011. The 2016 census measured the population of the rural district as 8,689 in 2,599 households. The most populous of its 41 villages was Bazui, with 1,344 people.

=== Other villages in the rural district ===
- Chah Pir
- Eshkali
- Golangun
- Samal-e Jonubi
- Samal-e Shomali
