= Riz District =

District in Bushehr province, Iran

Riz District Persian: بخش ریز
- District
- Location within Iran
- Coordinates: 28°03′N 52°08′E
- Country: Iran
- Province: Bushehr
- County: Jam
- Established: 2003
- Capital: Riz

Population (2016)
  - Total: 12,973
- Time zone: UTC+3:30 (IRST)

Riz District (Persian: بخش ریز) is in Jam County, Bushehr province, Iran. Its capital is the city of Riz.

== History ==
Two villages merged to form the city of Anarestan in 2009.

== Demographics ==
=== Population ===
At the time of the 2006 census, the district's population was 9,464 in 2,097 households. The following census in 2011 counted 11,018 people in 2,762 households. The 2016 census measured the population of the district as 12,973 in 3,608 households.

=== Administrative divisions ===
Riz District Population
| Administrative Divisions | 2006 | 2011 | 2016 |
|---|---|---|---|
| Anarestan RD | 2,891 | 616 | 666 |
| Riz RD | 1,422 | 1,562 | 1,594 |
| Tashan RD | 3,349 | 3,700 | 4,031 |
| Anarestan (city) | | 2,735 | 3,400 |
| Riz (city) | 1,802 | 2,405 | 3,282 |
| Total | 9,464 | 11,018 | 12,973 |
RD = Rural District
