= Central District (Ganaveh County) =

District in Bushehr province, Iran

Central District (Ganaveh County) Persian: بخش مرکزی شهرستان گناوه
- District
- Location within Iran
- Coordinates: 29°43′N 50°35′E
- Country: Iran
- Province: Bushehr
- County: Ganaveh
- Capital: Bandar Ganaveh

Population (2016)
  - Total: 88,649
- Time zone: UTC+3:30 (IRST)

The Central District of Ganaveh County (Persian: بخش مرکزی شهرستان گناوه) is in Bushehr province, Iran. Its capital is the city of Bandar Ganaveh.

== Demographics ==
=== Population ===
At the time of the 2006 National Census, the district's population was 70,110 in 14,940 households. The following census in 2011 counted 77,030 people in 19,013 households. The 2016 census measured the population of the district as 88,649 inhabitants living in 24,181 households.

=== Administrative divisions ===
Central District (Ganaveh County) Population
Administrative Divisions	2006	2011	2016
Hayat Davud RD	10,819	12,920	15,177
Bandar Ganaveh (city)	59,291	64,110	73,472
Total	70,110	77,030	88,649
RD = Rural District
