= Central District (Dayyer County) =

District in Bushehr province, Iran

Central District (Dayyer County) Persian: بخش مرکزی شهرستان دیر
- District
- Location within Iran
- Coordinates: 27°57′N 51°53′E
- Country: Iran
- Province: Bushehr
- County: Dayyer
- Capital: Bandar-e Dayyer

Population (2016)
  - Total: 40,970
- Time zone: UTC+3:30 (IRST)

The Central District of Dayyer County (Persian: بخش مرکزی شهرستان دیر) is in Bushehr province, Iran. Its capital is the city of Bandar-e Dayyer.

== History ==
The village of Bardestan was converted to a city in 2010. In 2012, the village of Dowrahak rose to city status as well. In 2013, Owli Rural District was created in the district, and Abdan Rural District and the city of Abdan were separated from it in the formation of Abdan District.

== Demographics ==
=== Population ===
At the time of the 2006 National Census, the district's population was 39,119 in 8,095 households. The following census in 2011 counted 42,765 people in 10,363 households. The 2016 census measured the population of the district as 40,970 inhabitants living in 11,095 households.

=== Administrative divisions ===
Central District (Dayyer County) Population
Administrative Divisions	2006	2011	2016
Abdan RD (Note: Transferred to Abdan District)	1,668	1,698	
Howmeh RD	12,939	8,621	2,963
Owli RD			1,960
Abdan (city)	6,058	6,211	
Bandar-e Dayyer (city)	18,454	20,157	24,083
Bardestan (city)		6,078	7,112
Dowrahak (city)			4,852
Total	39,119	42,765	40,970
RD = Rural District
