= Deyr County =

County in Bushehr province, Iran

Deyr County Persian: شهرستان دَیِّر
- County
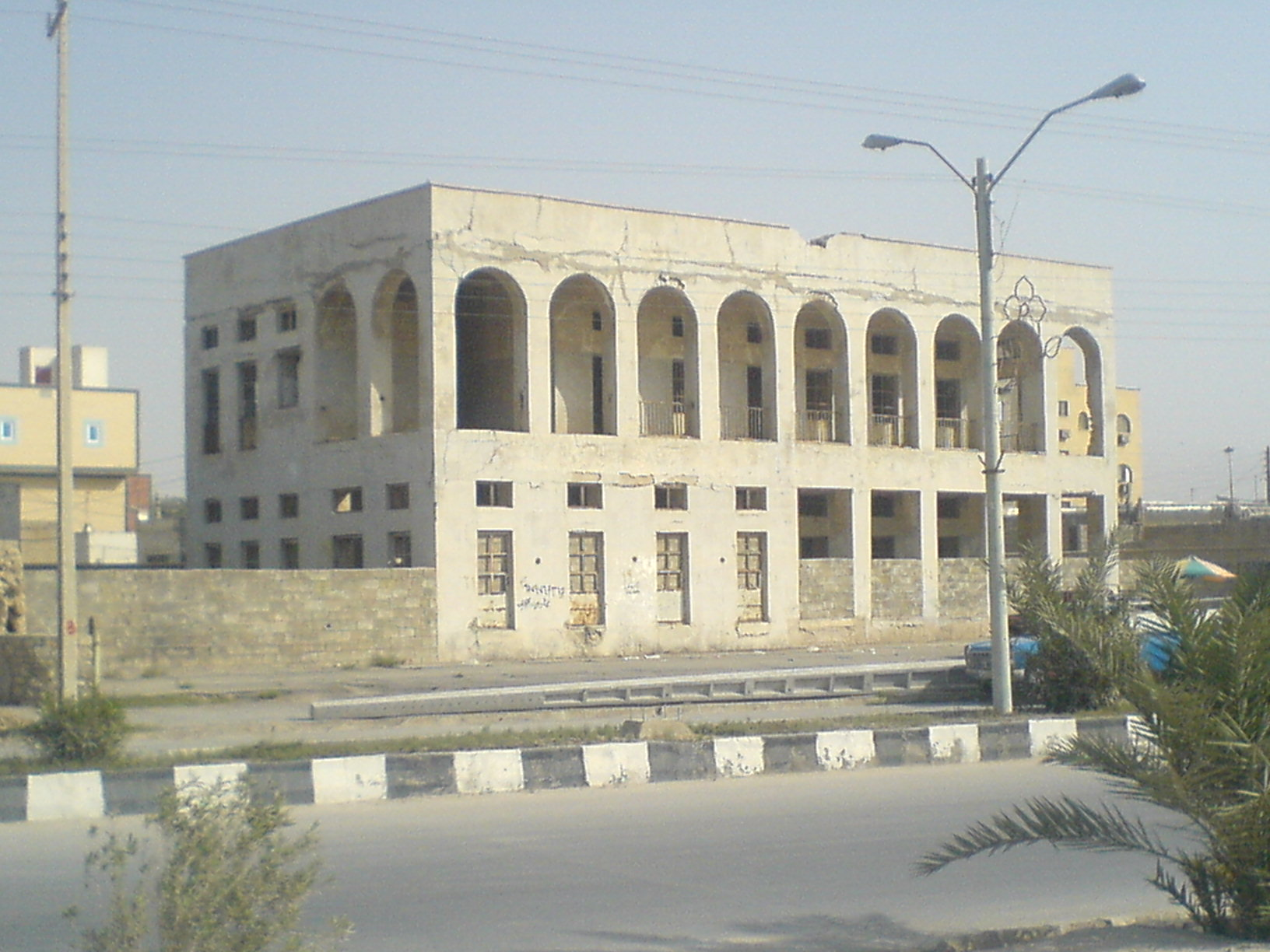
- Deyr

- Location of Deyr County in Bushehr province (bottom, green)

- Location of Bushehr province in Iran
- Coordinates: 28°01′N 51°42′E
- Country: Iran
- Province: Bushehr
- Capital: Bandar-e Deyr
- Districts: Central, Abdan, Bord Khun

Area
  - Total: 2,261 km^{2} (873 sq mi)

Population (2016)
  - Total: 60,612
  - Density: 26.81/km^{2} (69.43/sq mi)
- Time zone: UTC+3:30 (IRST)

Deyr County (Persian: شهرستان دَیِّر) (Note: Also romanized as Dayyer County) is in Bushehr province, Iran. Its capital is the city of Bandar-e Deyr.

== Etymology ==
According to some historians Deyr was named after a Jewish synagogue located in the heart of Deyr. The word Deyr is probably derived from the Hebraic word (דייר) which means resident.

== History ==
The village of Bardestan was converted to a city in 2010. In 2012, the village of Dowrahak rose to city status as well. In 2013, Owli Rural District was created in the Central District, and Abdan Rural District and the city of Abdan were separated from it in the formation of Abdan District, which was divided into two rural districts, including the new Sar Mastan Rural District.

== Demographics ==
=== Language and ethnicity ===
Some historians believe that Deyr County was exclusively inhabited by Jews, but over the years Muslims settled in the county, and a large proportion of Deyr county's Jews converted to Islam during the Safavid dynasty. The population nowadays is Muslim; the Jewish inhabitants left the county in 1979. Persians and Arabs are the major ethnicities in Deyr. Its citizens speak various forms of Persian languages, including Persian and the local Deyr dialect.

=== Population ===
At the time of the 2006 National Census, the county's population was 48,488 in 10,036 households. The following census in 2011 counted 52,523 people in 12,779 households. The 2016 census measured the population of the county as 60,612 in 16,403 households.

=== Administrative divisions ===
Deyr County's population history and administrative structure over three consecutive censuses are shown in the following table.

Deyr County Population
Administrative Divisions	2006	2011	2016
Central District	39,119	42,765	40,970
Abdan RD	1,668	1,698	
Howmeh RD	12,939	8,621	2,963
Owli RD			1,960
Abdan (city)	6,058	6,211	
Bandar-e Deyr (city)	18,454	20,157	24,083
Bardestan (city)		6,078	7,112
Dowrahak (city)			4,852
Abdan District			8,529
Abdan RD			954
Sar Mastan RD			748
Abdan (city)			6,827
Bord Khun District	9,369	9,758	11,113
Abkosh RD	3,954	4,222	4,352
Bord Khun RD	1,115	1,160	1,428
Bord Khun (city)	4,300	4,376	5,333
Total	48,488	52,523	60,612
RD = Rural District

== Overview ==
=== Location ===
Deyr county is one of the ten counties of Bushehr province. It has an area of 4000 km^{2}. Deyr County is bounded by the Persian Gulf to the west and south; Tangestan County and Dashti County to the north; and Kangan County and Jam County to the east.

The highest point in the county is Mount Drang at 1,223 m. Natural gas is extracted in the county. Wheat, tomatoes, corn, and other grains are grown. There is a local fishing industry.

The county includes three small towns and four villages, and several small islands such as Ommolkorm Island (area: 12 km^{2}) and Nakhilu Island (area: 6 km^{2}).

=== Climate and water ===
Deyr County has a climate that is mostly arid or semiarid. It has a very hot and humid summer, with temperatures increasing to 47 °C on occasion. Mond River is the only river in Deyr county, and there is plenty of spring water.

=== Flora and fauna ===
Deyr county has various mammal and bird species, such as camels, deer, foxes, rabbits, owls, hawks and flamingos, and caracals, striped hyenas, wolves, and jackals rarely can be seen. Mond natural reservation has an area of 537 km^{2}, conserving local animals and plants.

== In literature ==
Lorimer in his famous work, Gazetteer of the Persian Gulf, wrote that Deyr consists partly of stone houses and partly of huts, and is protected by a fort with towers. The population was about 5,500 people, including some Al-Nasur, some Bahrainis, and some Jews, but the bulk of the people claim to have come originally from Kufah.

== See also ==
Media related to Deyr County at Wikimedia Commons
