= Dashti County =

County in Bushehr province, Iran

Dashti County Persian: شهرستان دشتی
- County
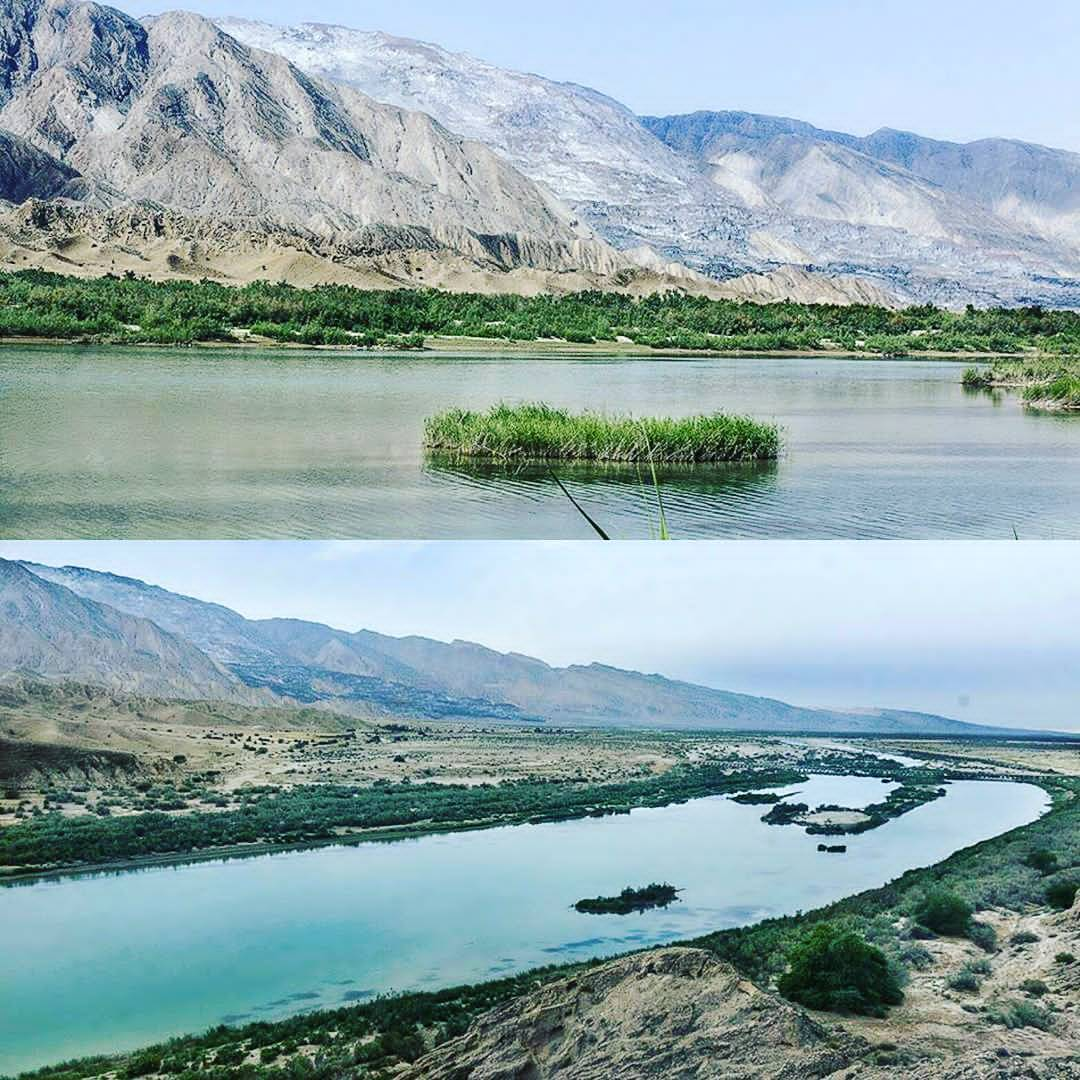
- Two views of the Mand River in Dashti County

- Location of Dashti County in Bushehr province (center, pink)

- Location of Bushehr province in Iran
- Coordinates: 28°26′N 51°37′E
- Country: Iran
- Province: Bushehr
- Capital: Khvormuj
- Districts: Central, Kaki, Shonbeh and Tasuj

Area
  - Total: 5,008 km^{2} (1,934 sq mi)

Population (2016)
  - Total: 86,319
  - Density: 17.24/km^{2} (44.64/sq mi)
- Time zone: UTC+3:30 (IRST)

Dashti County (Persian: شهرستان دشتی) is in Bushehr province, Iran. Its capital is the city of Khvormuj.

== History ==
The village of Shonbeh was converted to a city in 2009, and the village of Baduleh rose to city status in 2012.

== Demographics ==
=== Language and religion ===
The people are Muslim and speak various forms of Persian languages, including Persian and the local Dashti.

=== Population ===
At the time of the 2006 National Census, the county's population was 71,285 in 15,465 households. The following census in 2011 counted 77,530 people in 19,697 households. The 2016 census measured the population of the county as 86,319 in 24,474 households.

=== Administrative divisions ===
Dashti County's population history and administrative structure over three consecutive censuses are shown in the following table.

Dashti County Population
Administrative Divisions	2006	2011	2016
Central District	41,179	45,214	51,625
Khvormuj RD	4,181	4,486	4,549
Markazi RD	5,331	5,784	6,354
Khvormuj (city)	31,667	34,944	40,722
Kaki District	22,798	23,157	25,283
Cheghapur RD	5,391	5,261	1,581
Kabgan RD	4,850	5,096	4,657
Kaki RD	2,664	2,644	2,898
Baduleh (city)			4,028
Kaki (city)	9,893	10,156	12,119
Shonbeh and Tasuj District	7,308	7,903	8,621
Shonbeh RD (Note: Formerly Shonbeh and Tasuj Rural District)	6,361	4,454	4,808
Tasuj RD	947	921	1,066
Shonbeh (city)		2,528	2,747
Total	71,285	77,530	86,319
RD = Rural District

== Geography ==
=== Location and climate ===
Dashti County is bounded by the Persian Gulf to the west, Tangestan County to the north and west, Dashtestan County to the northeast, Dayyer County and Kangan County and to the south, Jam County to the southeast, and Firuzabad County to the east. The county has a 25 km coastline along the Persian Gulf, with a climate that is mostly arid or semiarid. The highest point in the county is Mount Beyrami at 1,950 m. Petroleum, natural gas, lime, and stone from quarries are extracted in the county.

=== 2013 Dashti County earthquake ===
A strong earthquake measuring 6.1 on the Richter scale struck the city of Shonbeh and villages of Shonbeh and Tasuj District in Dashti County on 9 April 2013, killing at least thirty-seven people.

== Economy ==
Wheat, tomatoes, corn, and other grains are grown. There is a local honey industry.

== Tourist attractions ==
- Khvormuj fortress
- Dokhtar fortress, located in Lavar-e saheli village
- Darab khan fortress, located in Shonbeh village
- Bahman dan fortress, located in Kaki city
- Mond temple
- Shirine building
- Mond River
- Mount Beyremi
- Mir Aram tomb
- Seyyed Mohammad Amin tomb, located in Kaki city
- Pir hashem tomb, located in Jabri village
- Shahzade Mohammad tomb, located in Sheikhyan village
- Dike Dojhtar, located in the Kaki city
- Baghan village
- Laver-e sharqi village

== See also ==
Media related to Dashti County at Wikimedia Commons
