= Central District (Jam County) =

District in Bushehr province, Iran

Central District (Jam County) Persian: بخش مرکزی شهرستان جم
- District
- Location within Iran
- Coordinates: 27°50′N 52°20′E
- Country: Iran
- Province: Bushehr
- County: Jam
- Established: 2003
- Capital: Jam

Population (2016)
  - Total: 57,037
- Time zone: UTC+3:30 (IRST)

The Central District of Jam County (Persian: بخش مرکزی شهرستان جم) is in Bushehr province, Iran. Its capital is the city of Jam. (Note: Formerly known as Velayat)

== History ==
The village of Baharestan was converted to a city in 2019.

== Demographics ==
=== Population ===
At the time of the 2006 National Census, the district's population was 28,535 in 6,315 households. The following census in 2011 counted 40,428 people in 10,995 households. The 2016 census measured the population of the district as 57,037 inhabitants living in 16,373 households.

=== Administrative divisions ===
Central District (Jam County) Population
Administrative Divisions	2006	2011	2016
Jam RD	14,417	20,426	21,089
Kuri RD	3,309	3,689	4,512
Baharestan (city) (Note: Formerly known as Do Lengeh) (Note: Became a city after the 2016 census)			
Jam (city)	10,809	16,313	31,436
Total	28,535	40,428	57,037
RD = Rural District
