= Central District (Tangestan County) =

District in Bushehr province, Iran

Central District (Tangestan County) Persian: بخش مرکزی شهرستان تنگستان
- District
- Location within Iran
- Coordinates: 28°54′N 51°22′E
- Country: Iran
- Province: Bushehr
- County: Tangestan
- Capital: Ahram

Population (2016)
  - Total: 40,157
- Time zone: UTC+3:30 (IRST)

The Central District of Tangestan County (Persian: بخش مرکزی شهرستان تنگستان) is in Bushehr province, Iran. Its capital is the city of Ahram.

== History ==
The village of Abad was converted to the city of Shahrabad in 2012.

== Demographics ==
=== Population ===
At the time of the 2006 census, the district's population was 35,259 in 8,134 households. The following census in 2011 counted 38,047 people in 9,948 households. The 2016 census measured the population of the district as 40,157 inhabitants living in 11,593 households.

=== Administrative divisions ===
Central District (Tangestan County) Population
| Administrative Divisions | 2006 | 2011 | 2016 |
|---|---|---|---|
| Ahram RD | 10,990 | 11,632 | 8,689 |
| Baghak RD | 12,087 | 12,637 | 12,483 |
| Ahram (city) | 12,182 | 13,778 | 15,198 |
| Shahrabad (city) (Note: Formerly the village of Abad) | | | 3,787 |
| Total | 35,259 | 38,047 | 40,157 |
RD = Rural District
