= Jam County =

County in Bushehr province, Iran

Jam County Persian: شهرستان جم
- County
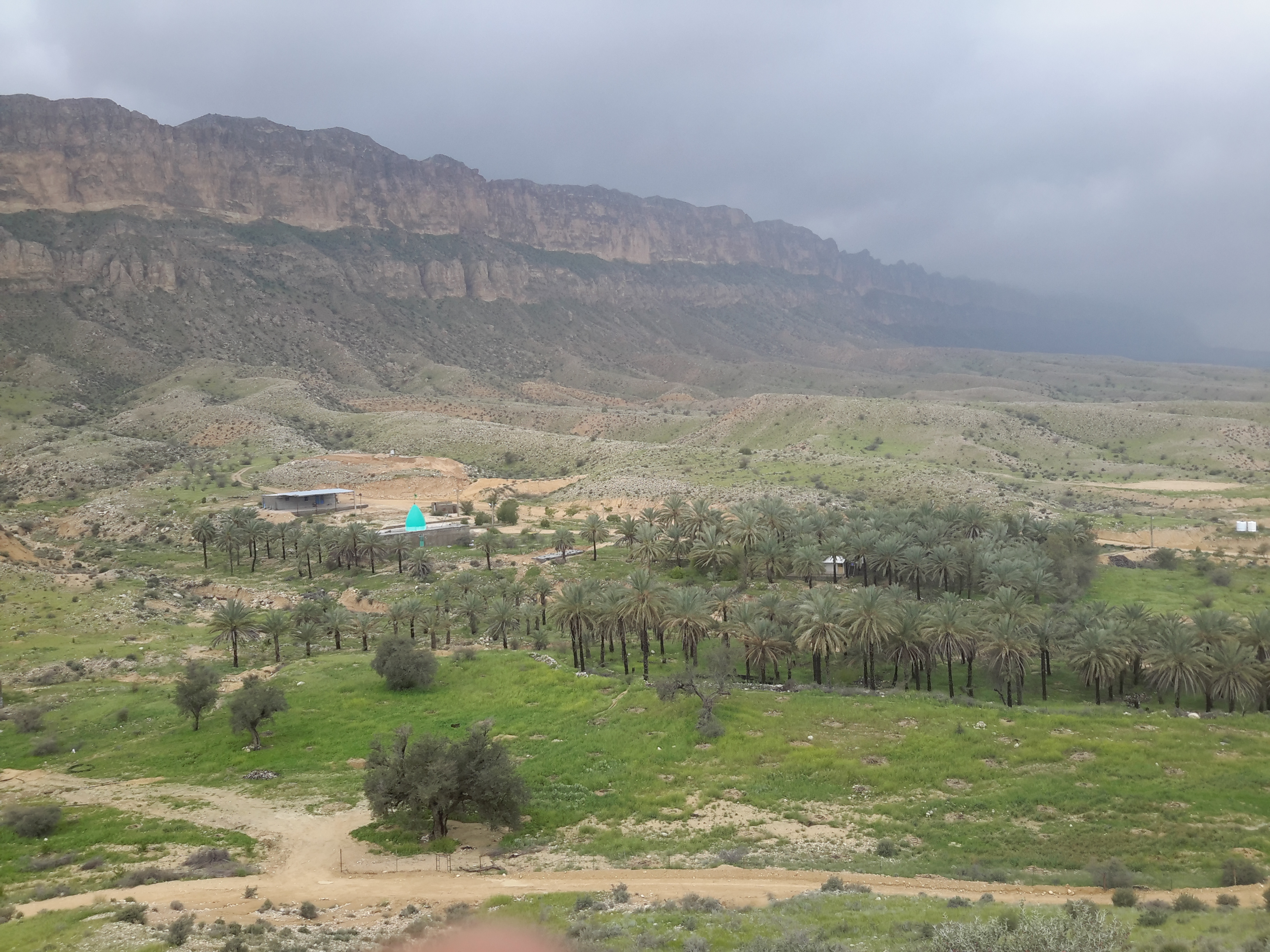
- The village of Dumiti in Jam County

- Location of Jam County in Bushehr province (bottom, purple)

- Location of Bushehr province in Iran
- Coordinates: 27°56′N 52°13′E
- Country: Iran
- Province: Bushehr
- Established: 2003
- Capital: Jam
- Districts: Central, Riz

Population (2016)
  - Total: 70,051
- Time zone: UTC+3:30 (IRST)

Jam County (Persian: شهرستان جم) is in Bushehr province, Iran. Its capital is the city of Jam. (Note: Formerly known as Velayat)

== History ==
Two villages merged to form the city of Anarestan in 2009, and the village of Baharestan was converted to a city in 2019.

== Demographics ==
=== Population ===
At the time of the 2006 National Census, the county's population was 37,999 in 8,412 households. The following census in 2011 counted 51,446 people in 13,748 households. The 2016 census measured the population of the county as 70,051 in 19,997 households.

=== Administrative divisions ===
Jam County's population history and administrative structure over three consecutive censuses are shown in the following table.

Jam County Population
| Administrative Divisions | 2006 | 2011 | 2016 |
|---|---|---|---|
| Central District | 28,535 | 40,428 | 57,037 |
| Jam RD | 14,417 | 20,426 | 21,089 |
| Kuri RD | 3,309 | 3,689 | 4,512 |
| Baharestan (city) (Note: Formerly known as Do Lengeh) (Note: Became a city in 2019) | | | |
| Jam (city) | 10,809 | 16,313 | 31,436 |
| Riz District | 9,464 | 11,018 | 12,973 |
| Anarestan RD | 2,891 | 616 | 666 |
| Riz RD | 1,422 | 1,562 | 1,594 |
| Tashan RD | 3,349 | 3,700 | 4,031 |
| Anarestan (city) | | 2,735 | 3,400 |
| Riz (city) | 1,802 | 2,405 | 3,282 |
| Total | 37,999 | 51,446 | 70,051 |
RD = Rural District

== Overview ==
The fast-growing city of Jam has a relatively moderate, wet climate, and is home to workers at the nearby, but very hot and dry, Kangan industrial complex. Jam is growing exponentially and affluently. Most of the workers in the city, and on the farms and gardens around the city, are Afghan migrant workers.

== See also ==
Media related to Jam County at Wikimedia Commons
