= Tangestan County =

County in Bushehr province, Iran

Tangestan County Persian: شهرستان تنگستان
- County
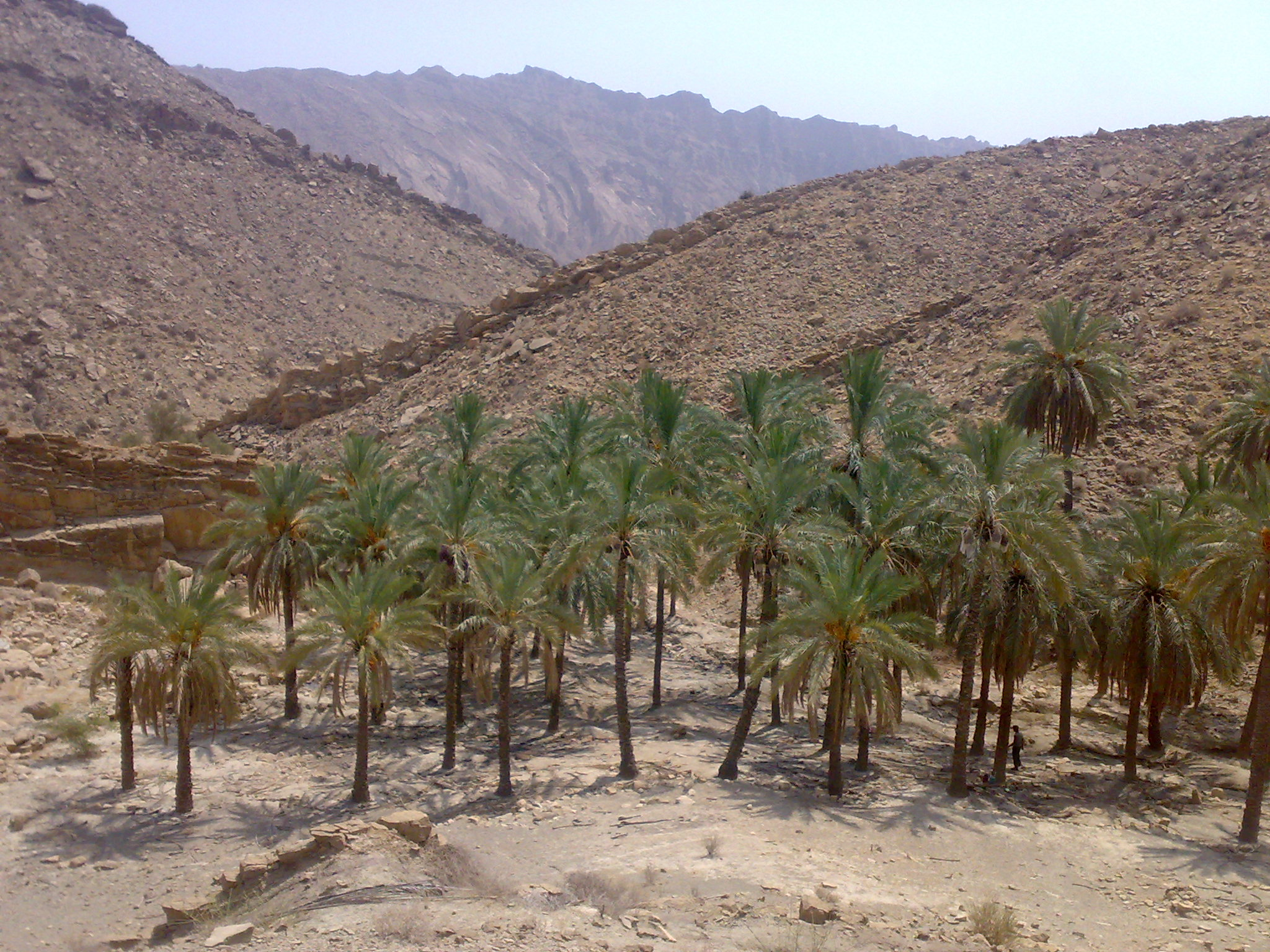
- Palm groves in Tangestan County

- Location of Tangestan County in Bushehr province (center, yellow)

- Location of Bushehr province in Iran
- Coordinates: 28°48′N 51°18′E
- Country: Iran
- Province: Bushehr
- Capital: Ahram
- Districts: Central, Delvar

Population (2016)
  - Total: 76,706
- Time zone: UTC+3:30 (IRST)

Tangestan County (Persian: شهرستان تنگستان) is in Bushehr province, Iran. Its capital is the city of Ahram.

== History ==
The village of Abad was converted to the city of Shahrabad in 2012.

== Demographics ==
=== Language and ethnicity ===
The people of this region are from the Tangestani Persian tribe, who are of Iranian origin and speak the southern dialact of Persian.

=== Population ===
At the time of the 2006 National Census, the county's population was 63,276 in 14,620 households. The following census in 2011 counted 70,282 people in 18,268 households. The 2016 census measured the population of the county as 76,706 in 22,080 households.

=== Administrative divisions ===
Tangestan County's population history and administrative structure over three consecutive censuses are shown in the following table.

Tangestan County Population
Administrative Divisions	2006	2011	2016
Central District	35,259	38,047	40,157
Ahram RD	10,990	11,632	8,689
Baghak RD	12,087	12,637	12,483
Ahram (city)	12,182	13,778	15,198
Shahrabad (city) (Note: Formerly the village of Abad)			3,787
Delvar District (Note: Formerly Saheli District)	28,017	32,154	36,481
Bu ol Kheyr RD	9,707	10,547	11,604
Delvar RD	15,109	17,903	20,435
Delvar (city)	3,201	3,704	4,442
Total	63,276	70,282	76,706
RD = Rural District

== Overview ==
The Tangestan region in southern Iran is well known for its resistance to the invasion by British forces in the late 19th century. Tangestan County is the home of the group of people known as Tangesir. Rais Ali Delvari, the commander of Tangesiri fighters, is known as a national hero in the region. Tangestan is also famous in Iran for its high-quality dates.

== See also ==
Media related to Tangestan County at Wikimedia Commons
