= Konar =

Konar may refer to:

- Konar (caste), a caste in Tamil Nadu, India
- Konar (village), a village in Karnataka, India
- Kunar Province of Afghanistan
- Kunar River of Afghanistan and Pakistan
- Kunhar River of Pakistan
- Konar River in the Indian state of Jharkhand
- Konar Dam, damming Konar River
- Konar-e Khoshk, a village in Fars Province, Iran
- Konar Baland, a village in Hormozgan Province, Iran
- Konar Bandak, a village in Bushehr Province, Iran
- Konar Bani, a village in Bushehr Province, Iran
- Konar, Chuvashia, a village in the Cuvashia region of Russia
- Konar Esmail, a village in Hormozgan Province, Iran
- Konar Sandal, an archaeological site in Kerman Province, Iran
- Konar Sandal, Iran, a village in Kerman Province, Iran
- Konar Helaleh, a village in Khuzestan Province, Iran
- Konar Kheymeh, a village in Bushehr Province, Iran
- Konar-e Naru, a village in Bushehr Province, Iran
- Konar Siah (disambiguation)
- Konar Tanku, a village in Hormozgan Province, Iran
- Konar-e Torsh, a village in Hormozgan Province, Iran
- Konar Torshan, a village in Bushehr Province, Iran
- Konar Zard, a village in Hormozgan Province, Iran

== See also ==
- Konar (surname)
- Konari (disambiguation)
