= Konari =

Konari (Persian: كناري) may refer to:

- Konari, Deyr, Bushehr Province
- Konari, Tangestan, Bushehr Province
- Konari, Fars
- Konari, Khuzestan
- Konari, Sistan and Baluchestan

== See also ==
- Konar (disambiguation)
