= Keshtu =

Keshtu كشتو
- Village
- Location within Iran
- Coordinates: 28°31′38″N 51°37′44″E
- Country: Iran
- Province: Bushehr
- County: Dashti
- Bakhsh: Shonbeh and Tasuj
- Rural District: Shonbeh

Population (2006)
  - Total: 42
- Time zone: UTC+3:30 (IRST)
  - Summer (DST): UTC+4:30 (IRDT)

Keshtu (Persian: كشتو, also Romanized as Keshtū and Kashtū; also known as Kashti) is a village in Shonbeh Rural District, Shonbeh and Tasuj District, Dashti County, Bushehr Province, Iran. At the 2006 census, its population was 42, in 7 families.
