= Sar Mastan =

Sar Mastan or Sarmastan (Persian: سرمستان) may refer to:

- Sar Mastan, Bushehr
- Sarmastan, Gilan
