= Luhak =

Village in Bushehr province, Iran

Luhak Persian: لوهك
- Village
- Location within Iran
- Coordinates: 28°01′03″N 51°52′04″E
- Country: Iran
- Province: Bushehr
- County: Deyr
- District: Abdan
- Rural District: Sar Mastan

Population (2016)
  - Total: 75
- Time zone: UTC+3:30 (IRST)

Luhak (Persian: لوهك) (Note: Also romanized as Lowhak and Lūhak) is a village in Sar Mastan Rural District of Abdan District in Deyr County, Bushehr province, Iran.

== Demographics ==
=== Population ===
At the time of the 2006 National Census, the village's population was 74 in 15 households, when it was in Abdan Rural District of the Central District. The following census in 2011 counted 72 people in 19 households. The 2016 census measured the population of the village as 75 people in 23 households, by which time the rural district had been separated from the district in the formation of Abdan District. Luhak was transferred to Sar Mastan Rural District created in the new district.
