= Kenari =

Kenari may refer to:

- Canarium ovatum or canarium nut
- Perodua Kenari, a car
- Kenari, Senen, Indonesia
- Kenari, Iran (disambiguation)
