= Darvishi =

Darvishi (Persian: درويشي) may refer to:

- Darvishi, Bushehr
- Darvishi, Khuzestan
