= Bon Bid =

Bon Bid بن بيد
- Village
- Country: Iran
- Province: Bushehr
- County: Dashti
- Bakhsh: Shonbeh and Tasuj
- Rural District: Shonbeh

Population (2006)
  - Total: 190
- Time zone: UTC+3:30 (IRST)
  - Summer (DST): UTC+4:30 (IRDT)

Bon Bid (Persian: بن بيد, also Romanized as Bon Bīd) is a village in Shonbeh Rural District, Shonbeh and Tasuj District, Dashti County, Bushehr Province, Iran. At the 2006 census, its population was 190, in 38 families.
