= Sar Mastan Rural District =

Rural district in Bushehr province, Iran

Sar Mastan Rural District Persian: دهستان سرمستان
- Rural District
- Location within Iran
- Coordinates: 28°03′N 51°54′E
- Country: Iran
- Province: Bushehr
- County: Deyr
- District: Abdan
- Established: 2013
- Capital: Sar Mastan

Population (2016)
  - Total: 748
- Time zone: UTC+3:30 (IRST)

Sar Mastan Rural District (Persian: دهستان سرمستان) is in Abdan District of Deyr County, Bushehr province, Iran. Its capital is the village of Sar Mastan.

== History ==
In 2013, Abdan Rural District and the city of Abdan were separated from the Central District in the formation of Abdan District, and Sar Mastan Rural District was created in the new district.

== Demographics ==
=== Population ===
At the time of the 2016 census, the rural district's population was 748 in 212 households. The most populous of its 10 villages was Sar Mastan, with 468 people.

=== Other villages in the rural district ===
- Luhak
- Tang-e Khvosh
