= Dehuk =

Village in Bushehr province, Iran

Dehuk Persian: دهوك
- Village
- Location within Iran
- Coordinates: 28°30′09″N 51°47′46″E
- Country: Iran
- Province: Bushehr
- County: Dashti
- District: Shonbeh and Tasuj
- Rural District: Tasuj

Population (2016)
  - Total: 245
- Time zone: UTC+3:30 (IRST)

Dehuk (Persian: دهوك) (Note: Also romanized as Dehook and Dehūk; also known as Dāhu, Dehak, and Dehū) is a village in Tasuj Rural District of Shonbeh and Tasuj District in Dashti County, Bushehr province, Iran.

== Demographics ==
=== Population ===
At the time of the 2006 National Census, the village's population was 168 in 42 households. The following census in 2011 counted 219 people in 61 households. The 2016 census measured the population of the village as 245 people in 67 households.
