= Sena, Iran =

Village in Bushehr province, Iran

Sena Persian: سنا
- Village
- Location within Iran
- Coordinates: 28°27′09″N 51°36′16″E
- Country: Iran
- Province: Bushehr
- County: Dashti
- District: Shonbeh and Tasuj
- Rural District: Shonbeh

Population (2016)
  - Total: 1,411
- Time zone: UTC+3:30 (IRST)

Sena (Persian: سنا) (Note: Also romanized as Senā; also known as Sāna, Shenā, and Sina) is a village in Shonbeh Rural District (Note: Formerly Shonbeh and Tasuj Rural District) of Shonbeh and Tasuj District in Dashti County, Bushehr province, Iran.

== Demographics ==
=== Population ===
At the time of the 2006 National Census, the village's population was 1,251 in 262 households. The following census in 2011 counted 1,278 people in 325 households. The 2016 census measured the population of the village as 1,411 people in 393 households.
