= Konar Siah =

Konar Siah or Konarsiyah or Konar-e Siah, or Kenar Sayeh or Konar-e Seyah (Persian: كنارسياه) may refer to:

- Konar Siah, Bandar Abbas, Hormozgan Province
- Konar-e Siah, Bastak, Hormozgan Province
- Konar Siah, Qeshm, Hormozgan Province
