= Chah Qad =

Village in Bushehr province, Iran

Chah Qad Persian: چاه قد
- Village
- Country: Iran
- Province: Bushehr
- County: Deyr
- District: Abdan
- Rural District: Abdan

Population (2016)
  - Total: 155
- Time zone: UTC+3:30 (IRST)

Chah Qad (Persian: چاه قد) is a village in Abdan Rural District of Abdan District in Deyr County, Bushehr province, southwestern Iran. The village lies along the northern coast of the Persian Gulf, within a region characterized by its proximity to the sea and integration into the broader coastal administrative framework of the province.

== Demographics ==
=== Population ===
The village did not appear in the 2006 National Census, when it was in the Central District. At the time of the following census in 2011, the village's population was 121 in 28 households. The 2016 census measured the population of the village as 155 people in 41 households, by which time the rural district had been separated from the district in the formation of Abdan District.
