= Sarmak =

Village in Bushehr province, Iran

Sarmak Persian: سرمك
- Village
- Location within Iran
- Coordinates: 28°28′07″N 51°51′51″E
- Country: Iran
- Province: Bushehr
- County: Dashti
- District: Shonbeh and Tasuj
- Rural District: Tasuj

Population (2016)
  - Total: 291
- Time zone: UTC+3:30 (IRST)

Sarmak (Persian: سرمك) is a village in, and the capital of, Tasuj Rural District in Shonbeh and Tasuj District of Dashti County, Bushehr province, Iran.

== Demographics ==
=== Population ===
At the time of the 2006 National Census, the village's population was 293 in 66 households. The following census in 2011 counted 298 people in 70 households. The 2016 census measured the population of the village as 291 people in 89 households. It was the most populous village in its rural district.
