= Kerdelan =

Village in Bushehr province, Iran

Kerdelan Persian: كردلان
- Village
- Location within Iran
- Coordinates: 28°14′57″N 51°48′27″E
- Country: Iran
- Province: Bushehr
- County: Dashti
- District: Shonbeh and Tasuj
- Rural District: Shonbeh

Population (2016)
  - Total: 617
- Time zone: UTC+3:30 (IRST)

Kerdelan (Persian: كردلان) (Note: Also romanized as Kerdelān; also known as Kardilu, Kerdīleh, Kordevān, and Kordlan) is a village in Shonbeh Rural District (Note: Formerly Shonbeh and Tasuj Rural District) of Shonbeh and Tasuj District in Dashti County, Bushehr Province, Iran.

== Demographics ==
=== Population ===
At the time of the 2006 National Census, the village's population was 356 in 72 households. The following census in 2011 counted 542 people in 120 households. The 2016 census measured the population of the village as 617 people in 170 households.
