= Tang-e Khvosh =

Village in Bushehr province, Iran

Tang-e Khvosh Persian: تنگ خوش
- Village
- Location within Iran
- Coordinates: 27°59′09″N 51°55′03″E
- Country: Iran
- Province: Bushehr
- County: Deyr
- District: Abdan
- Rural District: Sar Mastan

Population (2016)
  - Total: 107
- Time zone: UTC+3:30 (IRST)

Tang-e Khvosh (Persian: تنگ خوش,) (Note: Also romanized as Tang-e Khowsh) is a village in Sar Mastan Rural District of Abdan District in Deyr County, Bushehr province, Iran.

== Demographics ==
=== Population ===
At the time of the 2006 National Census, the village's population was 113 in 64 households, when it was in Howmeh Rural District of the Central District. The following census in 2011 counted 119 people in 26 households. The 2016 census measured the population of the village as 107 people in 32 households, by which time the village had been separated from the district in the formation of Abdan District. Tang-e Khvosh was transferred to Sar Mastan Rural District created in the new district.
