= Baghan, Bushehr =

Village in Bushehr province, Iran

Baghan Persian: باغان
- Village
- Location within Iran
- Coordinates: 28°11′59″N 51°53′23″E
- Country: Iran
- Province: Bushehr
- County: Dashti
- District: Shonbeh and Tasuj
- Rural District: Shonbeh

Population (2016)
  - Total: 1,574
- Time zone: UTC+3:30 (IRST)

Baghan (Persian: باغان) (Note: Also romanized as Bāghān) is a village in Shonbeh Rural District (Note: Formerly Shonbeh and Tasuj Rural District) of Shonbeh and Tasuj District in Dashti County, Bushehr province, Iran.

== Demographics ==
=== Population ===
At the time of the 2006 National Census, the village's population was 1,171 in 237 households. The following census in 2011 counted 1,478 people in 359 households. The 2016 census measured the population of the village as 1,574 people in 415 households. It was the most populous village in its rural district.
