= Sar Mastan, Bushehr =

Village in Bushehr province, Iran

Sar Mastan Persian: سرمستان
- Village
- Location within Iran
- Coordinates: 28°02′26″N 51°49′42″E
- Country: Iran
- Province: Bushehr
- County: Deyr
- District: Abdan
- Rural District: Sar Mastan

Population (2016)
  - Total: 468
- Time zone: UTC+3:30 (IRST)

Sar Mastan (Persian: سرمستان) (Note: Also romanized as Sar Mastān; also known as Sarvestān and Sarvistān) is a village in, and the capital of, Sar Mastan Rural District in Abdan District of Deyr County, Bushehr province, Iran.

== Demographics ==
=== Population ===
At the time of the 2006 National Census, the village's population was 523 in 93 households, when it was in Abdan Rural District of the Central District. The following census in 2011 counted 576 people in 126 households. The 2016 census measured the population of the village as 468 people in 127 households, by which time the rural district had been separated from the district in the formation of Abdan District. Sar Mastan was transferred to Sar Mastan Rural District created in the new district. It was the most populous village in its rural district.
