= Dasht-e Palang =

Village in Bushehr province, Iran

Dasht-e Palang Persian: دشت پلنگ
- Village
- Location within Iran
- Coordinates: 28°27′58″N 51°54′12″E
- Country: Iran
- Province: Bushehr
- County: Dashti
- District: Shonbeh and Tasuj
- Rural District: Tasuj

Population (2016)
  - Total: 167
- Time zone: UTC+3:30 (IRST)

Dasht-e Palang (Persian: دشت پلنگ) is a village in Tasuj Rural District of Shonbeh and Tasuj District in Dashti County, Bushehr province, Iran.

== Demographics ==
=== Population ===
At the time of the 2006 National Census, the village's population was 38 in 10 households. The following census in 2011 counted 120 people in 37 households. The 2016 census measured the population of the village as 167 people in 50 households.
