= Konar Bandak =

Konar Bandak كناربندك
- Village
- Location within Iran
- Coordinates: 28°31′34″N 51°47′14″E
- Country: Iran
- Province: Bushehr
- County: Dashti
- Bakhsh: Shonbeh and Tasuj
- Rural District: Tasuj

Population (2006)
  - Total: 87
- Time zone: UTC+3:30 (IRST)
  - Summer (DST): UTC+4:30 (IRDT)

Konar Bandak (Persian: كناربندك, also Romanized as Konār Bandak, Kenār Bandak, and Konār-e Bandak) is a village in Tasuj Rural District, Shonbeh and Tasuj District, Dashti County, Bushehr Province, Iran. At the 2006 census, its population was 87, in 20 families.
