= Abdullah Mubarak al-Daghari =

- Died: 5 May 2011; Shabwah Governorate, Yemen
- Occupations: Terrorist, AQAP officer
- Military career
- Allegiance: Al-Qaeda
- Branch: AQAP (?–2011)
- Service years: ?–2011
- Rank: Officer in the AQAP: Yemen Insurgency

Abdullah Mubarak al-Daghari was a militant Islamist and mid-level leader of al-Qaeda. The brother of Musa'id Mubarak al-Daghari, they were reportedly killed in a car on 5 May 2011 in an airstrike by the United States near Abdan, Shabwah Governorate, Yemen. It has been speculated that the US obtained information from Osama bin Laden's hideout compound which was used to find Abdullah and his brother, which came just days later. The Yemeni authorities had implicated the brothers in recent bombing attacks in Yemen.
