= Geshi, Deyr =

Village in Bushehr province, Iran

Geshi Persian: گشي
- Village
- Location within Iran
- Coordinates: 28°02′59″N 51°48′01″E
- Country: Iran
- Province: Bushehr
- County: Deyr
- District: Abdan
- Rural District: Abdan

Population (2016)
  - Total: 151
- Time zone: UTC+3:30 (IRST)

Geshi (Persian: گشي) (Note: Also romanized as Gashī and Geshī; also known as Gīshī) is a village in Abdan Rural District of Abdan District in Deyr County, Bushehr province, Iran.

== Demographics ==
=== Population ===
At the time of the 2006 National Census, the village's population was 175 in 26 households, when it was in the Central District. The following census in 2011 counted 178 people in 34 households. The 2016 census measured the population of the village as 151 people in 36 households, by which time the rural district had been separated from the district in the formation of Abdan District.
