= Konar (surname) =

Konar is a surname. It may refer to:

- Adam Konar (born 1993), Canadian football linebacker
- Benoy Krishna Konar (1930–2014), Indian politician
- Hare Krishna Konar (1915–1974), Indian politician
- Karmegha Konar (1889–1957), Tamil poet and educator
- Kevin Konar (born 1958), Canadian football linebacker
- Megan Konar, American scientist and water resources engineer
- Nilay Konar (born 1980), Turkish volleyball player

== See also ==
- Konar (disambiguation)
