= Daihatsu E-series engine =

Engine series from Daihatsu

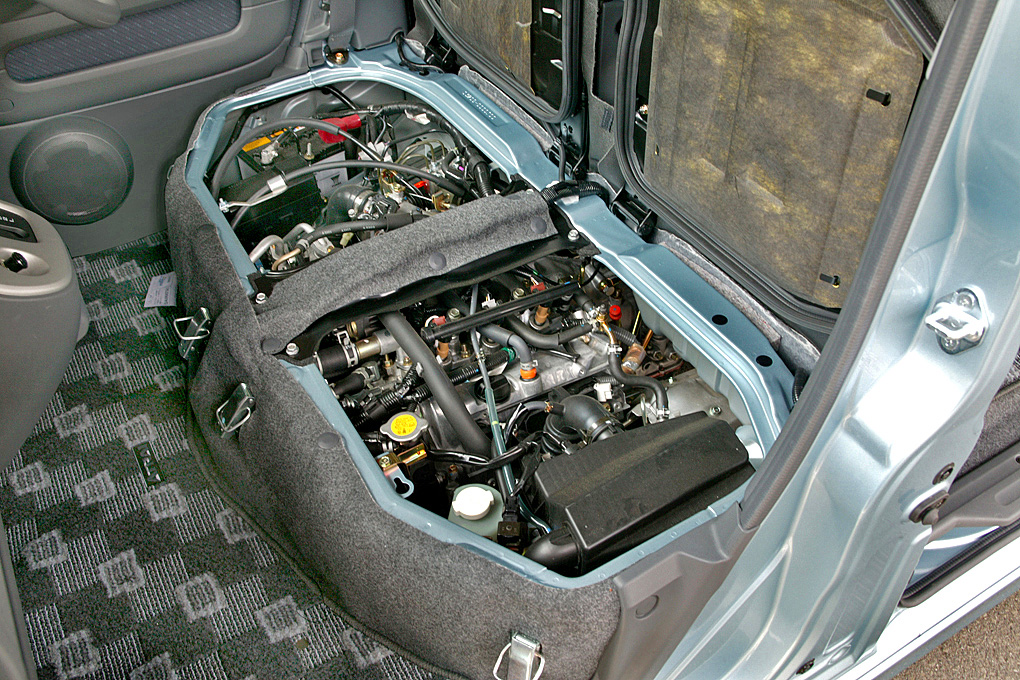
The turbocharged 660 cc EF-DET engine in a Daihatsu Atrai

The Daihatsu E-series engine is a range of compact three-cylinder, internal combustion piston engines, designed by Daihatsu, which is a subsidiary of Toyota. The petrol-driven series has cast iron engine blocks and aluminum cylinder heads, and are of either SOHC or DOHC design, with belt driven heads.

The E series engine was first presented in the summer of 1985, as the EB, a replacement for the two-cylinder AB engine used in Daihatsu's Kei cars until then. The engine was Daihatsu's second three-cylinder design. Originally with two valves per cylinder, four-valve versions later appeared as did turbocharged versions. The engine is quite light, with the original EB-10 weighing in at 60–63 kg (132–139 lb) depending on transmission fitment.

== EB-series (550 cc) ==
The EB-series is a 547 cc (0.55 L) version built in Daihatsu's Osaka plant in Japan from mid-1985, meant for their domestic market range of Kei cars. Bore is 62 mm (2.44 in) and stroke is 60.5 mm (2.38 in), with a firing order of 1—2—3. Outputs range between 32 and 64 PS (24 and 47 kW), which at the time was the most a manufacturer could have as per stated by the Gentlemen's Agreement between car manufacturers. Power claims for the very earliest Mira/Cuore models are in gross rather than net, which explains slight differences in power ratings for the first few years. This engine has not been exported to any great extent, with Daihatsu's export models usually receiving the larger ED and C-series engines.

The EB-series was only ever available with an SOHC valvetrain and two valves per cylinder, as Daihatsu were late to adopt multi-valve technology for their kei car range. However, the EB was available with an IHI turbocharger and intercooler, originally carburetted but later with fuel injection. This is still the only Kei engine to have reached the 64 PS threshold with only two valves per cylinder. There is also a rare supercharged version developed for the Hijet Pickup, to provide extra low-down torque and allow for an air conditioning unit to be fitted and used even when heavily loaded. This engine was also used for an economy version of the Italian Innocenti Mini, until replaced by the later 660 cc EF engine.

Applications:

- Daihatsu Mira/Cuore (L70/71)
- Daihatsu Leeza (L100)
- Daihatsu Hijet/Atrai (S80/81)
- 1987-1990 Innocenti 500 L/LS

		Power (JIS net)			Torque				Comp.	Fuel system	Fitment	Notes
		PS	kW	at rpm	kgm	Nm	lbft	at rpm	Comp.	Fuel system	Fitment	Notes
N/A	EB-10 EB-40 EB-45	32	24	6,000	4.4	43	32	3,500	10.0	carb	Mira (EB-10), Cuore (EB-40/45), Leeza (EB-40), Leeza Van (EB-10)	34 PS (gross)
N/A	EB-60	30	22	5,500	4.5	44	33	3,500	10.0	carb	Hijet, Atrai (86.05-90.03)	
N/A	EB-10	31	23	6,400	4.3	42	31	3,000	10.0	carb	Innocenti 500 L/LS	No cat, outputs in ECE
Turbo	EB-20 EB-50	50	37	6,500	7.0	69	51	4,000	8.3	carb, IC	Mira TR (EB-20, 1985.08-90.02) Cuore CR (EB-50, 1985.08-90.02), Leeza TR-ZZ (EB-20, 1989.01-90.07)	52 PS (gross); IHI RHB51
Turbo	EB-21	50	37	6,000	7.0	69	51	3,500	8.3	carb, IC	Leeza Van (1986.11-90.07)	
Turbo	EB-70	46	34	6,000	6.5	64	47	3,500	8.6	carb, IC	Atrai (1986.05-88.10)	IHI RHB51
Turbo	EB-71	52	38	6,000	7.2	71	52	4,000	8.6	carb, IC	Atrai (1988.10-90.03)	
Turbo	EB-25	58	43	6,500	7.4	73	54	4,000		EFI, IC	Mira TR-XX EFI (87.10-88.10)	IHI RHB31AW
Turbo	EB-26	64	47	6,500	7.7	76	56	4,000	8.0	EFI, IC	Mira TR-XX EFI (88.10-90.02), Leeza TR-ZZ EFI (89.01-90.08)	IHI RHB31AW
S/C	EB-80	44	32	6,000	6.0	59	43	3,500		carb	Hijet Pickup (87.05-90.02)	

== ED-series (850 cc) ==
The ED-series is a 847 cc (0.85 L) version originally intended for the export versions of the Cuore/Mira. The ED-series had undergone several changes from being carbureted 'ED-10' to 'ED-DE' where the introduction of fuel injected DOHC had been introduced, reviving this newly redesigned engine. This engine has never been available in the domestic Japanese market. In 1994 Daihatsu equipped the ED series with indirect multipoint fuel injection, called the ED-20. Daihatsu fitted this 847 cc displacement ED-20 engine to the L500 series 1994.09–1998.05 Daihatsu Cuore/Domino/Handi export model and in early export versions of the Daihatsu Move. Bore is 66.6 mm and stroke is 81 mm.

The ED engine was to undergo a long development as production was later taken over by Malaysia's Perodua. In its latest DVVT form, called 'ED-VE', it was kept in production until 2014 for the Perodua Viva. There was also a short-lived special version for the Swiss markets, where several cantons had tax systems which favoured cars of less than 800 cc. This, the ED-10A, had a two millimeter narrower bore (64.6 × 81 mm) for a displacement of 796 cc, and had also been license-made by the now-defunct Asia Motors to be fitted in the Towner, which was a licensed copy of the Daihatsu Hijet.

Applications:

- 1986.10–1990.05 Daihatsu Cuore/Domino/Handi (L80)
- 1999–19?? Daihatsu Charade (G100, New Zealand)
- 1994.09–1998.05 Daihatsu Cuore/Domino/Handi (L500 series)
- 1996.10-1999.10 Daihatsu Move (L601)
- 2001.07–2006 Daihatsu Ceria (Indonesia)
- 1994–2007 Perodua Kancil
- 2001–2007 Perodua Kelisa
- 2007–2014 Perodua Viva

Versions

		Power			Torque			Norm	Comp.	Fuel system	Cat	Fitment	Notes
		PS	kW	at rpm	Nm	lbft	at rpm	Norm	Comp.	Fuel system	Cat	Fitment	Notes
ED-10	6V SOHC	44	32	5,500	67	49	3,200	DIN	9.5	Carburetor	–	Cuore/Domino/Handi, Charade	
ED-10	6V SOHC	40	29	5,600	63	46	3,250	DIN	9.5	Carburetor	●	Cuore/Handi	
ED-10	6V SOHC	37	27	5,500	63	46	3,200	DIN	9.5	Carburetor		Perodua Kancil EX 850 / EZ 850/Daihatsu Ceria	
ED-??	6V SOHC	35.5	26	4,800	65	48	2,800		?	Carburetor	–	Industrial engine for slanted installations	Can also be run on CNG
ED-10A	6V SOHC	41	30	5,500	62	46	3,200	DIN	9.0	Carburetor	–	Cuore (87.09-90.05)	796 cc, CH only
ED-20	6V SOHC	44	32	5,600	67	49	3,800	DIN	9.5	Multipoint Fuel Injection	Lambda sond	Cuore / Mira L500-series (94.09-98.05), Daihatsu Move L601 (96.10-99.10)	
ED-DE	12V DOHC	50	37	5,200	74.4	55	4,000	DIN	10.1	Multipoint Fuel Injection	Lambda sond	Cuore / Mira L500 & L700-series, Perodua Kancil EZi 850, Perodua Kelisa EX 850	
ED-VE	12V DOHC	52	38	6,000	76	56	4,000	DIN	10	Multipoint Fuel Injection	Lambda sond	Perodua Viva 850	

== EF-series (660 cc) ==
The EF-series is a 659 cc (0.66 L) version designed to replace the EB series engine when kei car regulations changed for 1990. It was first seen in the Daihatsu Mira when it was facelifted in March 1990. The bore is 68 mm (expanded from 62) and stroke is 60.5 mm. Having undergone a long development, a myriad versions of this engine have been developed, and fitted to a multitude of Daihatsu products. Production ended in December 2007, by which time the new KF engine had replaced the EF across the board. The EF was nearly as light as its predecessor, with a 2004 EF-SE clocking in at 68 kg (150 lb) - this with the added weight of modern emissions equipment and fuel injection.

Versions

		Power (JIS net)			Torque				Comp.	Fuel system	Fitment	Notes
		PS	kW	at rpm	kgm	Nm	lbft	at rpm	Comp.	Fuel system	Fitment	Notes
SOHC 6V	EF-CL	40	29	6,500	5.3	52	38	3,500	9.5	carb	Mira L200/210, Mira L500V/510V	
SOHC 6V	EF-CL	31	23	6,400	5.0	49	36	3,200	9.5	carb	Perodua Kancil 660 EX	
SOHC 6V	EF-CS	40	29	5,700	5.5	54	40	4,500	9.5	carb	Hijet/Atrai S82/83	
SOHC 6V	EF-VS	42	31	5,700	5.6	55	41	4,500	9.5	carb	Hijet/Atrai S82/83	from 91.09
SOHC 6V	EF-ES	42	31	6,000	5.7	56	41	3,500	10.0	EFI	Hijet/Atrai S82/83	from 92.08
SOHC 6V	EF-ES	44	32	6,100	5.9	58	43	3,600	9.8	EFI	Hijet S100/110, Atrai S120/130	
SOHC 6V	EF-KL	42	31	6,800	5.4	53	39	4,400	9.5	EFI	Mira L200/210, Mira L500 (until 95.09), Opti L300/310 (until 98.10)	from 92.08
SOHC 6V	EF-NS	42	31	5,700	5.6	55	41	4,500	9.5	carb	Hijet S100/110, Atrai S120/130	from 94.01
SOHC 6V	EF-FL	40	29	6,300	5.3	52	38	3,500	9.5	carb	Mira L500S/510S (passenger car version of EF-CL)	
SOHC 6V	EF-CK	31	23	4,900	5.1	50	37	3,200	9.5	carb	Midget II K100 (96.04-99.08)	manual choke
SOHC 6V	EF-SE	45	33	6,400	5.6	55	41	3,600	9.5	EFI	Mira L700/710, Move L900/910, Opti L800/810	
SOHC 6V	EF-SE	64	47	6,400	5.7	56	41	4,800	9.5	EFI	Mira L250/260 (from 2002.12)	
SOHC 6V	EF-SE	64	47	5,900	6.4	63	46	4,000	10.5	EFI	Hijet S200/210 (until 2002.01)	43 PS until 02.01
SOHC 6V	EF-SE	45	33	5,900	5.8	57	42	3,600	9.5	EFI	Hijet S200/210 (until 2007.12), Hijet Cargo S320/330	
SOHC 6V	EF-SE	33	24	4,900	5.2	51	38	4,000	9.5	EFI	Midget II K100	from 99.08
SOHC 6V Turbo IC	EF-XL	61	45	7,000	8.6	84	62	4,000	8.3	carb	Mira TR-XX L200V (90.03-92.08)	
SOHC 6V Turbo IC	EF-XS	61	45	6,000	8.7	85	63	4,000	8.5	carb	Hijet/Atrai S82/83	until 91.08
SOHC 6V Turbo IC	EF-TS	64	47	6,000	8.8	86	64	4,000	8.3	EFI	Hijet/Atrai S82/83, Atrai S120/130	from 91.08
SOHC 12V	EF-HL	50	37	7,500	5.3	52	38	4,500	10.0	carb	Mira L200/210 (90.03-95.01), Leeza L111 (90.08-92.01)	
SOHC 12V	EF-EL	55	40	7,000	5.8	57	42	4,000	10.0	EFI	Mira L200/210 aut. (90.03-94.09), Mira L500/510 (94.08-95.09)	
SOHC 12V turbo IC	EF-JL	64	47	7,500	9.4	92	68	4,000	8.0	EFI	Mira L200/210/220 (90.03-94.09), Mira L500/510 (94.08-95.09), Leeza L111 (91.01-92.01), Leeza Spider L111SK (91.11-93.08)	
DOHC 12V	EF-GL	52	38	7,200	5.8	57	42	4,500	10.0	carb	Move L600 (95.08-98.12)	
DOHC 12V	EF-GS	44	32	5,900	6.0	59	43	4,400	10.0	carb	Hijet S100/110, Atrai S120/130 (96.01-99.01)	
DOHC 12V	EF-VE	58	43	7,600	6.5	64	47	4,000	10.5	EFI	Mira, Move, Hijet S100/110, Atrai S120/130, Tanto L350/360 (03.11-07.12)	
DOHC 12V	EF-VE	64	47	5,900	6.4	63	46	4,000	10.5	EFI	Atrai S220/230 (99.01-07.01)	
DOHC 12V	EF-VE2	52	38	6,800	6.3	62	46	4,000	11.3	EFI	Mira "TV" L700 (98.12-02.12)	economy CVT
DOHC 12V	EF-ZL	55	40	7,500	6.2	61	45	4,000	10.0	EFI	Mira L500/510, Opti L300/310, Move L600/610 (95.08-98.12)	
DOHC 12V	EF-ZS	46	34	6,100	6.2	61	45	4,000	10.0	EFI	Hijet S100/110, Atrai S120/130 (96.01-99.01)	
DOHC 12V	EF-VD	60	44	7,600	6.6	65	48	4,000	11.0	EFI DI	Mira L250 (02.12-06.10)	
DOHC 12V Turbo	EF-RL	64	47	6,800	10.7	105	77	4,000	8.5	EFI	Mira L500/510, Move L600/610 (96.05-98.12)	
DOHC 12V Turbo	EF-RS	64	47	5,900	10.0	98	72	3,500	8.5	EFI	Atrai S120/130 (97.01-99.01)	
DOHC 12V Turbo	EF-DET	64	47	6,400	10.9	107	79	3,600	8.5	EFI	Move L900/910 (98.10-02.10), Naked L750/760 (to 03.05), Opti L800/810 (98.11-02.07), Terios Kid/Lucia J111/131	
DOHC 12V Turbo	EF-DET	64	47	6,400	10.5	103	76	3,200	8.5	EFI	Tanto L350/360, Move L150/160 (02.10-06.01), Move Latte L550/560, Naked L750/760 (03.05-04.04)	

== EJ-series (1 litre) ==
The EJ-series appeared in February 1998, its first generation is known as 'EJ-DE' was used in the generation of Daihatsu Mira L700 (Exported out of Japan Models)/Perodua Kelisa & Daihatsu Move L900 (Exported out of Japan Models)/ Perodua Kenari. An 81.0 mm stroke and a 72.0 mm bore makes for a total displacement of 989 cc (1.0 L). It is a DOHC, 12-valve inline three-cylinder water-cooled engine. An upgrade of this engine was made after the introduction of Daihatsu Mira Avy L250 series (Exported out of Japan Models)/Perodua Viva & Perodua Myvi's First Generation in 2007, where the new engine was known as 'EJ-VE' which was included with a DVVT system for fuel efficiency and meeting new Euro standards. The Perodua Myvi's First Generation stopped using this engine after a while due to lacking of demand from the public. After the Perodua Viva was discontinued in 2014 and Daihatsu Xenia in Indonesia stopped offering the 'EJ-VE' series of 1.0 litre variant since August 2016, it is no longer used in any automotive applications and is succeeded by Toyota KR engine built by Daihatsu for Daihatsu Sigra 1.0. Production of the EJ-VE engine (for upright placement) is continued for industrial use.

Applications:

- Perodua Kenari
- Perodua Viva
- Daihatsu Xenia (2004-2016)

Versions

		Power			Torque			Norm	Comp.	Fuel system	Cat	Fitment	Notes
		PS	kW	at rpm	Nm	lbft	at rpm	Norm	Comp.	Fuel system	Cat	Fitment	Notes
12V DOHC	EJ-DE	55	40	5,200	88	65	3,200	DIN	9.5	Fuel Injection	–	Perodua Kenari, Kelisa	
12V DOHC	EJ-VE	61	45	6,000	90	66	3,600	DIN	10.0	Fuel Injection	–	Perodua Viva	

== See also ==
- List of Toyota engines
