= Shonbeh =

City in Bushehr province, Iran

Shonbeh Persian: شنبه
- City
- Location within Iran
- Coordinates: 28°23′40″N 51°45′51″E
- Country: Iran
- Province: Bushehr
- County: Dashti
- District: Shonbeh and Tasuj
- Established as a city: 2009

Population (2016)
  - Total: 2,747
- Time zone: UTC+3:30 (IRST)

Shonbeh (Persian: شنبه) (Note: Also romanized as Shanbeh; also known as Chambeh, Shamba, Shambeh, Shumbeb, and Shumbeh) is a city in, and the capital of, Shonbeh and Tasuj District in Dashti County, Bushehr province, Iran. It also serves as the administrative center for Shonbeh Rural District. (Note: Formerly Shonbeh and Tasuj Rural District)

== Demographics ==
=== Population ===
At the time of the 2006 National Census, Shonbeh's population was 2,414 in 505 households, when it was a village in Shonbeh Rural District. The census in 2011 counted 2,528 people in 609 households, by which time Shonbeh had been converted to a city. The 2016 census measured the population of the city as 2,747 people in 760 households.

=== 2013 Dashti County earthquake ===
A strong earthquake measuring 6.1 struck the city of Shonbeh and villages of Shonbeh and Tasuj District on 9 April 2013, killing at least 37 people.

== See also ==
Media related to Shonbeh at Wikimedia Commons
