= Daihatsu Opti =

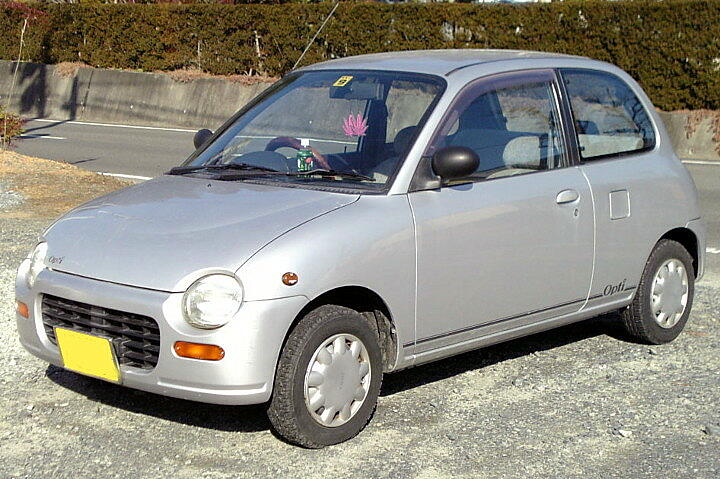
- 1992 Daihatsu Opti

Overview
- Manufacturer: Daihatsu
- Production: January 1992 – July 2002
- Assembly: Japan

Body and chassis
- Class: Kei car
- Layout: Front-engine, front-wheel-drive; Front-engine, four-wheel-drive

Chronology
- Predecessor: Daihatsu Leeza

The Daihatsu Opti (Japanese: ダイハツ・オプティ, Hepburn: Daihatsu Oputi) is a kei car produced by Japanese automaker Daihatsu from 1992 to 2002, which replaced the Leeza. It was available with a 658 cc petrol engine and either front- or four-wheel drive, and marketed as a more upmarket variant of the Mira. The name "Opti" refers to both "optimistic" and "optimum".

== First generation (L300; 1992) ==
First generation (L300)
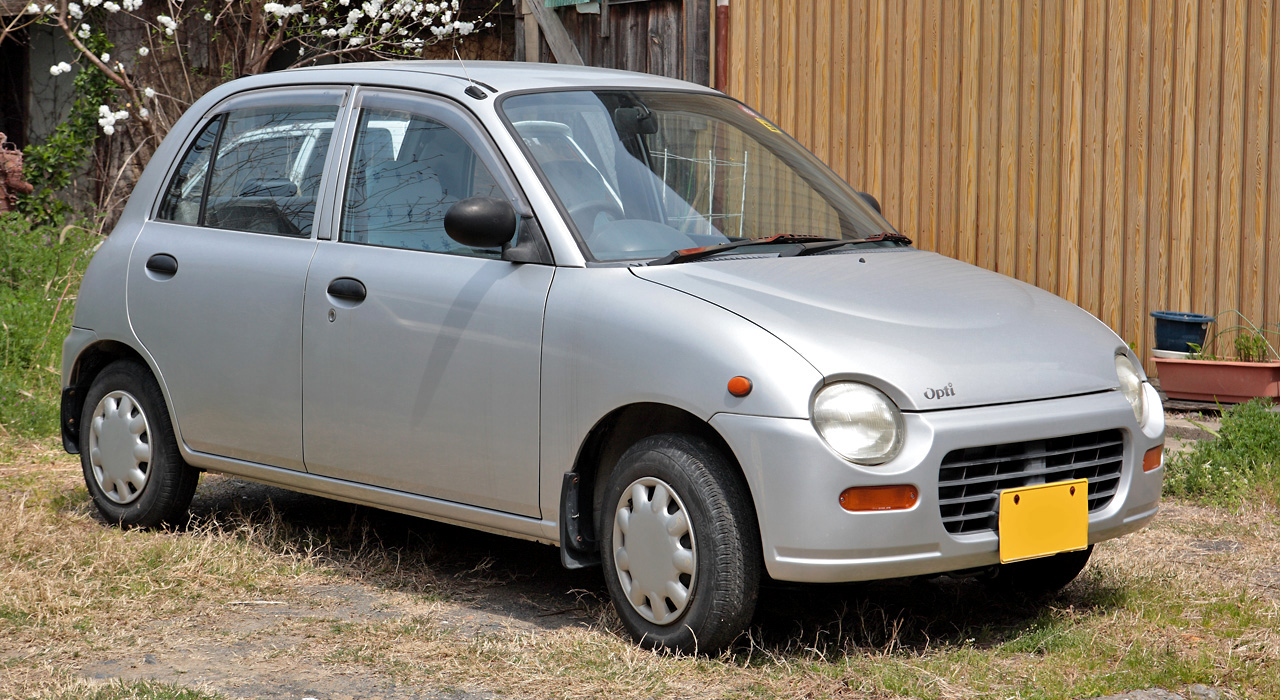

Overview
- Production: January 1992 – October 1998

Body and chassis
- Body style: 3/5-door hatchback
- Related: Daihatsu Mira (L200)

Powertrain
- Engine: Petrol: 658 cc EF-KL I3; 658 cc EF-EL 12V I3; 658 cc EF-ZL DOHC 12V I3
- Transmission: 5-speed manual; 3-speed automatic; 4-speed automatic

Dimensions
- Wheelbase: 2,280 mm (89.8 in)
- Length: 3,295 mm (129.7 in)
- Width: 1,395 mm (54.9 in)
- Height: 1,395–1,430 mm (54.9–56.3 in)
- Kerb weight: 650–750 kg (1,433–1,653 lb)

The first-generation Opti was launched in Japan in January 1992, after having been previewed at the 1991 Tokyo Motor Show as the "X-409". The Opti was built on the L200 series Mira chassis. The round appearance was conceived around an "ultra lovely" theme and was aimed at female buyers. Specifications were also higher than usual in the kei class, with ample sound insulation and additional rust protection. All models originally came with the EF-EL engine, a fuel-injected, SOHC, 12-valve three-cylinder engine with 55 PS (40 kW). It was available as a three-door hatchback with an electrically operated canvas top was also available. A 4WD model (dubbed Aℓ-4, model code L310) was also available. In September 1992, the Ox, Ax, and Aℓ-4 trim levels were joined by the low-priced Ad, a sportier Ad-S and the luxurious Ad-I which also has a driver's side airbag. The Ad model got a two-valve version of the EF engine (EF-KL) with 42 PS (31 kW).

In December 1992, the Opti Club Sport was introduced, a version with 13-inch aluminium wheels, sports suspension and a Momo steering wheel, only available in metallic black colour. In August 1993, a five-door variant arrived, as well as the lower-priced Pico model. In May 1994, the Pico S was introduced; this version combined the Pico specifications with the sporting additions of the Club Sport. The three-speed automatic transmission were upgraded to a four-speed unit. In February 1995, the Opti sticker on the right side of the bonnet was replaced with a centrally-placed shield logo. At the same time the Parco special edition, equipped with a roof spoiler, was introduced. In October 1995, the SOHC 12-valve EF-EL engine was replaced with a DOHC version (EF-ZL), which also equipped in Pico Limited. The canvas top option was discontinued. In May 1996, the retro Opti Classic model was introduced, featuring a chrome grille and various other detail touches including leather trimmed interior. A driver's side airbag also became standard across the range, reflecting updated regulations. In May 1997, the front bumper and taillights were changed. The Classic variant was also changed cosmetically and the chromed "Classic" emblem was no longer mounted on the bonnet. In August 1997, the Club Sport model was reintroduced as a permanent member of the lineup, which is still a three-door model equipped with Momo steering wheel. It was based on the Classic model. In December 1997, the Parco Classic limited-edition model was introduced. In November 1998, as kei car regulations were changed, the first-generation Opti was replaced by the second-generation model.

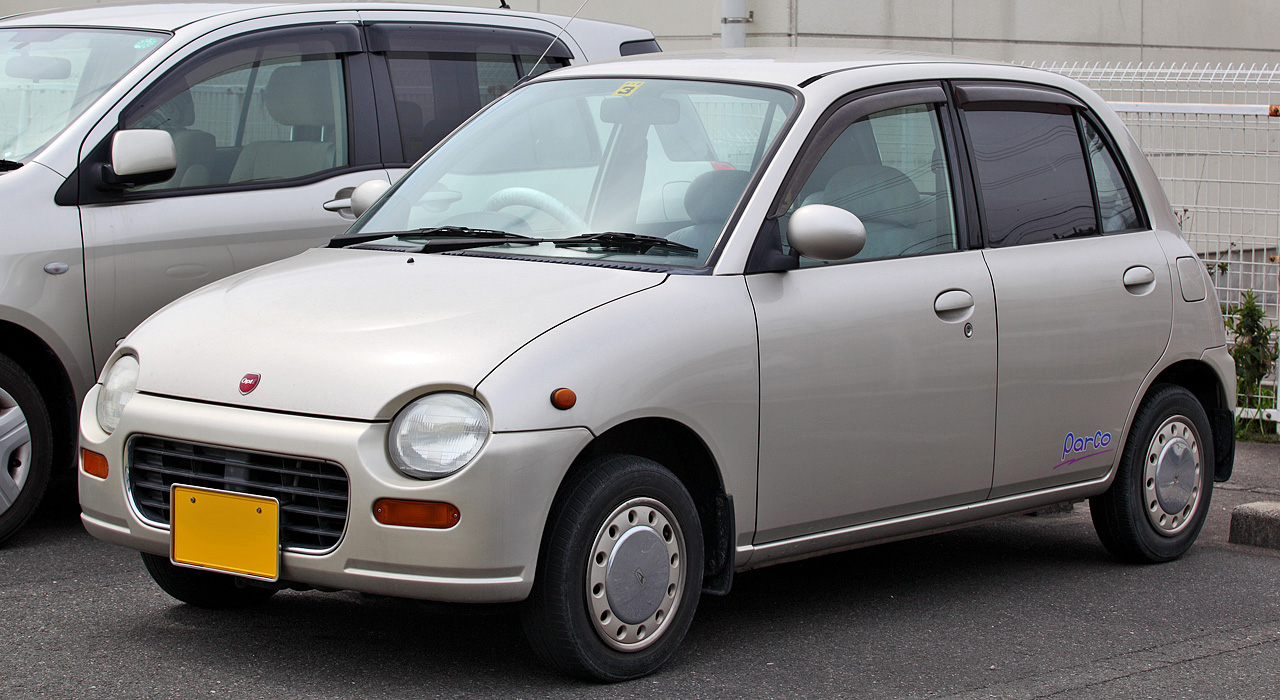
Opti Parco

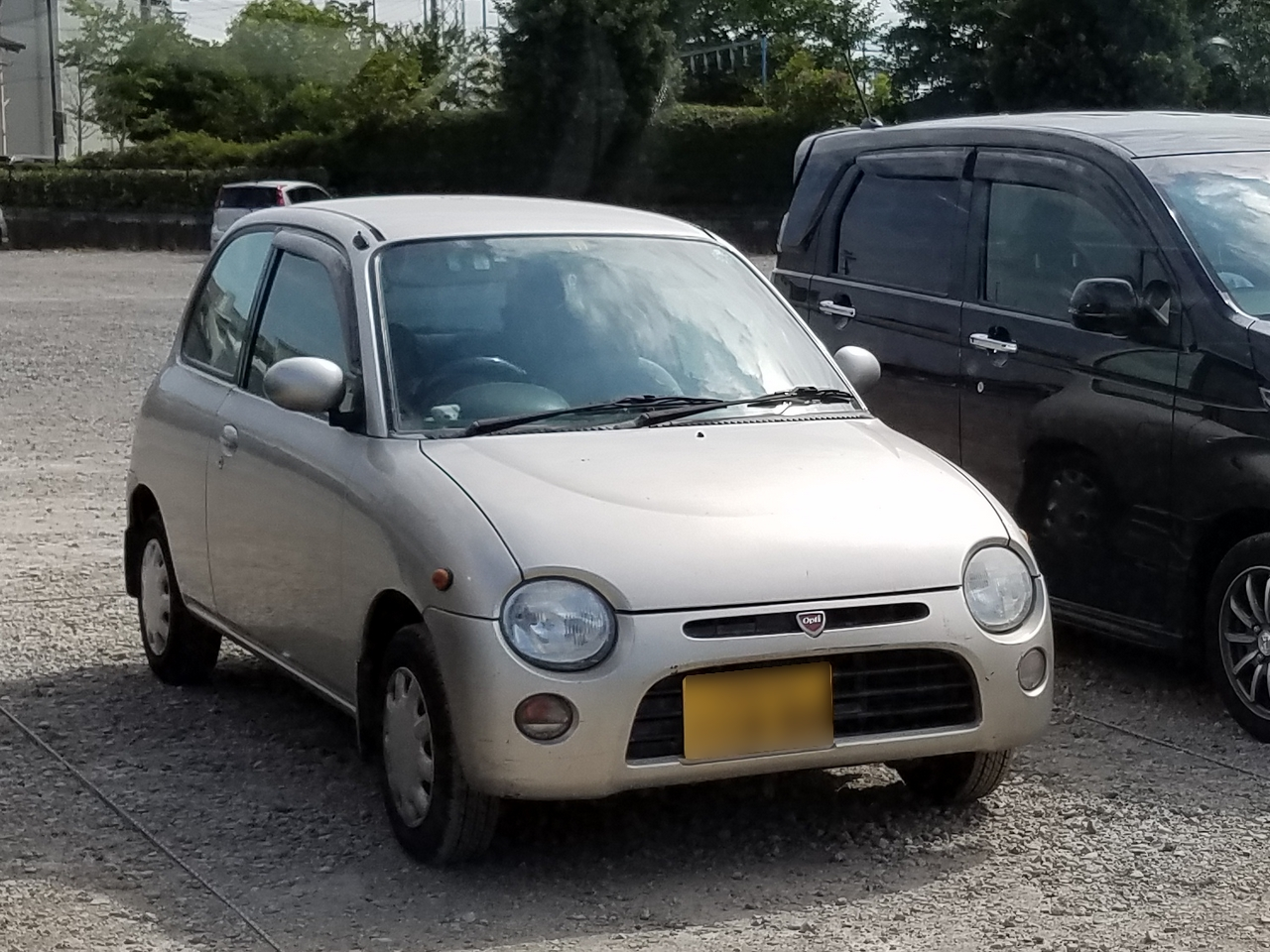
Opti Pico Limited

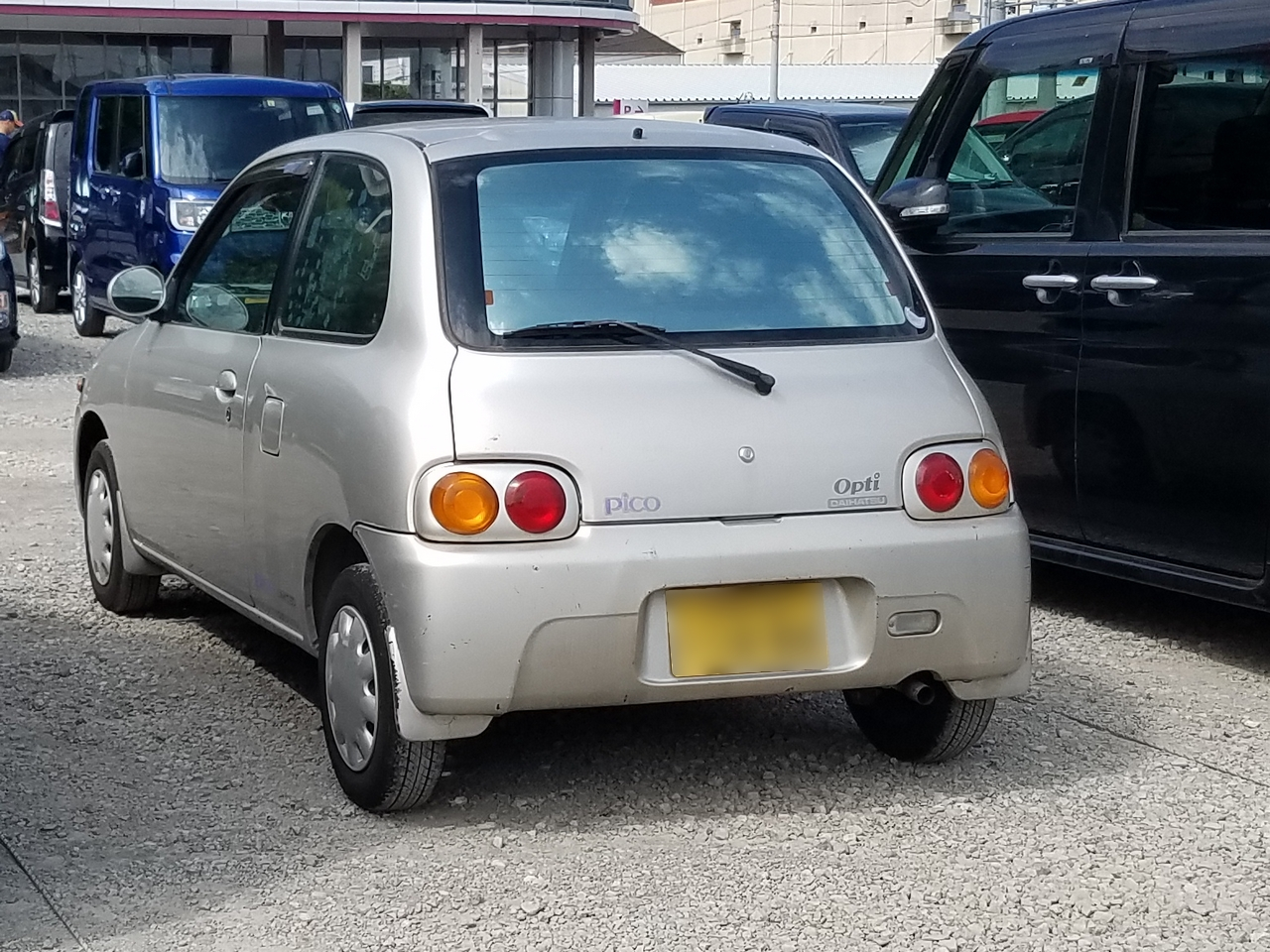
Opti Pico Limited

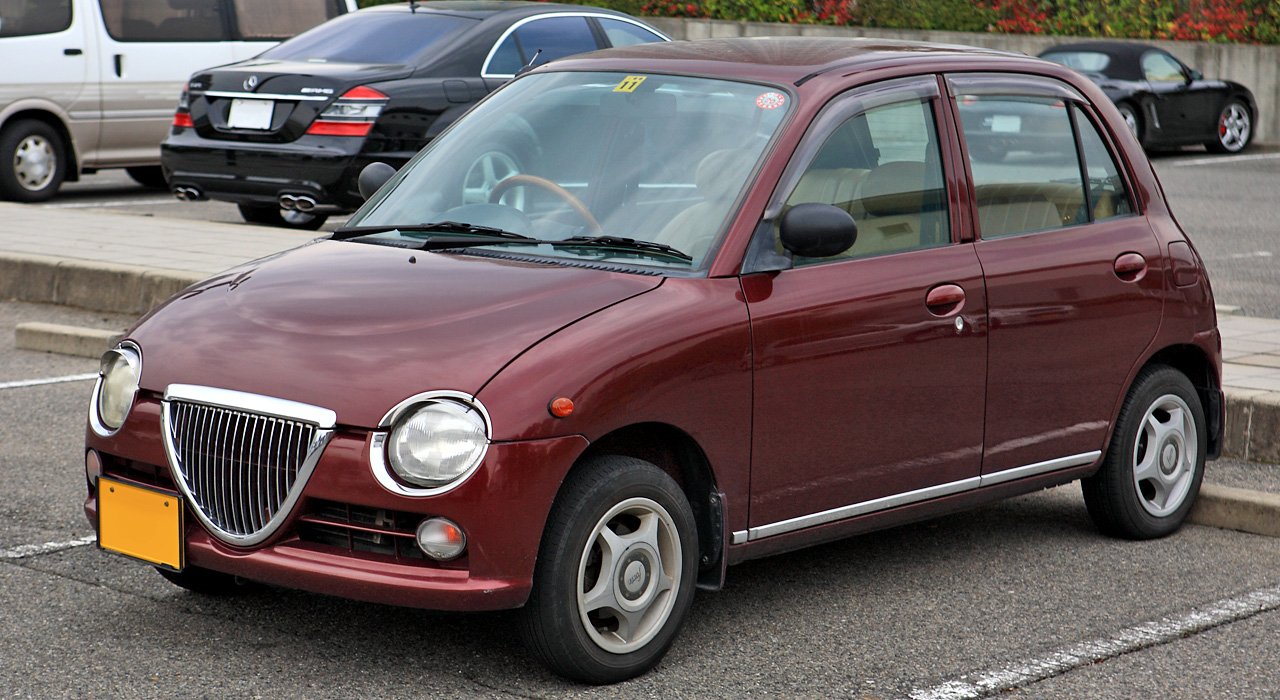
Opti Classic

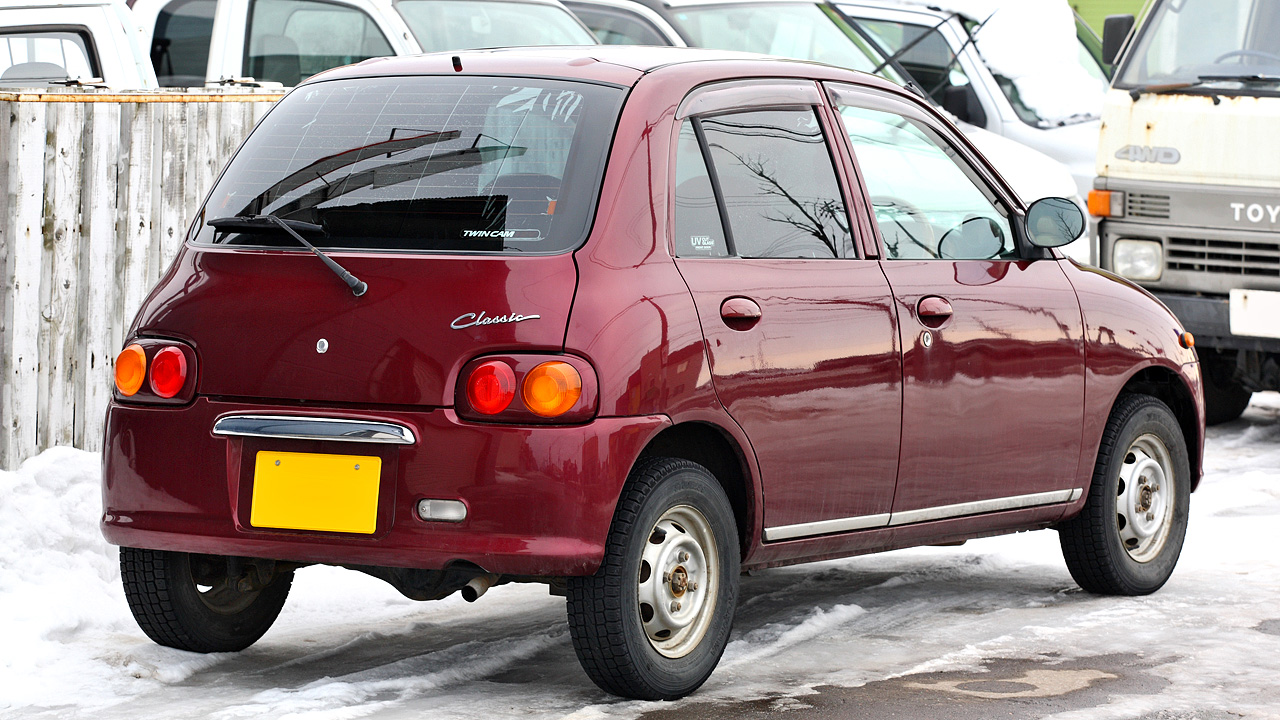
Opti Classic

=== YM Mobilemates Ami ===
YM Mobilemates, a branch of Yamaha Motor Company, produced the Ami (stylised as "ami"), a micro coupé with Ferrari F40-inspired design. The Ami is a variant of the Opti fitted with a dummy mid-engine design body. It came with the same engine as the Opti, an SOHC or DOHC 12-valve 55 PS (40 kW) engine. 600 units of the car were planned to be produced but it was said that only three were ordered. The Ami was only sold in Japan's capital area via an event ticket supplier called Ticket Pia.

== Second generation (L800; 1998) ==
Second generation (L800)
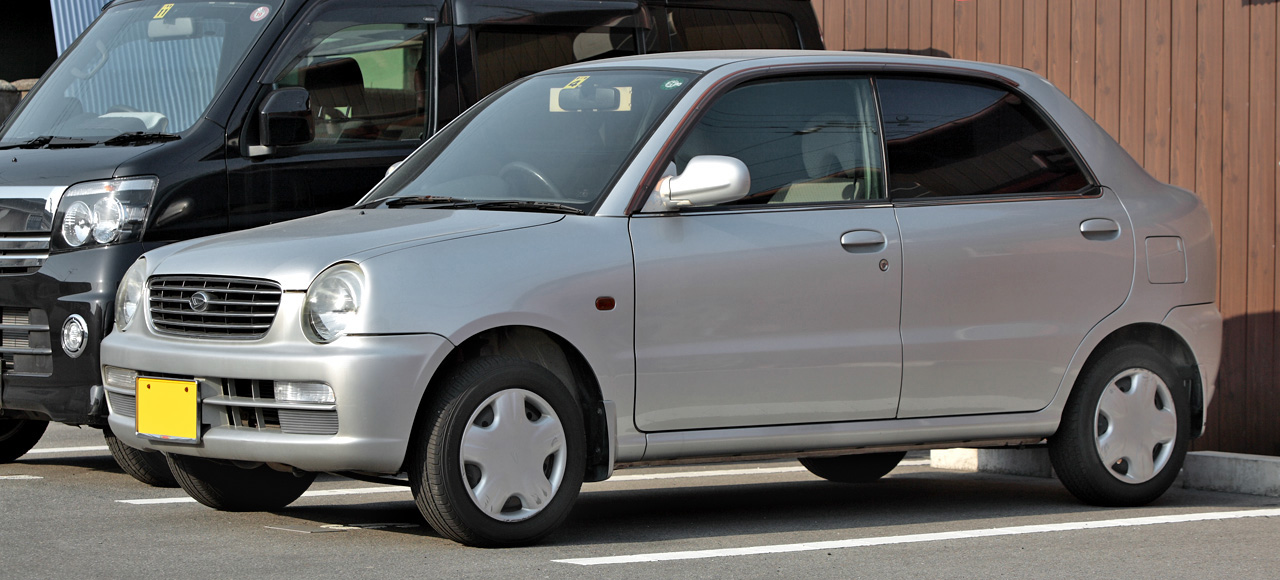

Overview
- Production: November 1998 – July 2002

Body and chassis
- Body style: 4-door hardtop sedan
- Related: Daihatsu Mira (L500)

Powertrain
- Engine: Petrol: 658 cc EF-SE I3; 658 cc EF-VE I3; 658 cc EF-DET turbo I3; 658 cc JB-DET turbo I4
- Power output: 33 kW (44 hp; 45 PS) (EF-SE); 43 kW (58 hp; 58 PS) (EF-VE); 47 kW (63 hp; 64 PS) (EF-DET)
- Transmission: 5-speed manual; 3-speed automatic; 4-speed automatic

Dimensions
- Wheelbase: 2,360 mm (92.9 in)
- Length: 3,395 mm (133.7 in)
- Width: 1,475 mm (58.1 in)
- Height: 1,405 mm (55.3 in)
- Kerb weight: 730–820 kg (1,609–1,808 lb)

The second-generation Opti was launched in Japan in November 1998. It was based on the modified L500 series Mira chassis, and available as a four-door hardtop sedan in two different styles: Opti and Opti Classic (launched in 2000). The high-performance model, called Opti Aerodown Beex, was also available. It was discontinued in 2002.

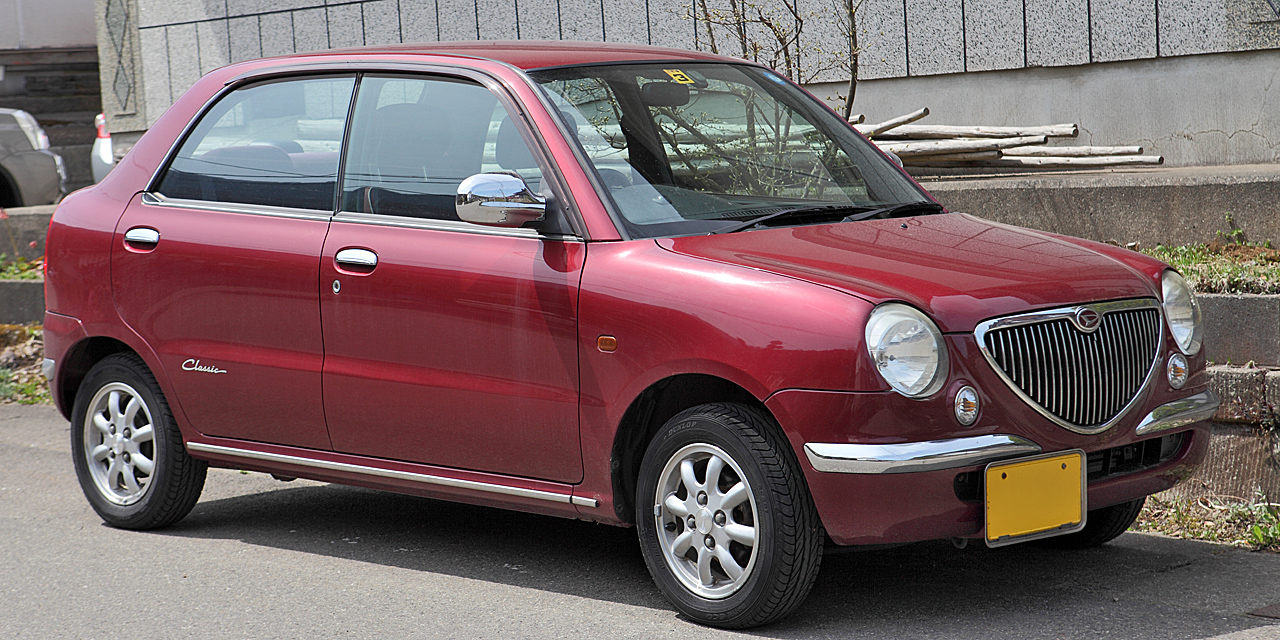
Opti Classic

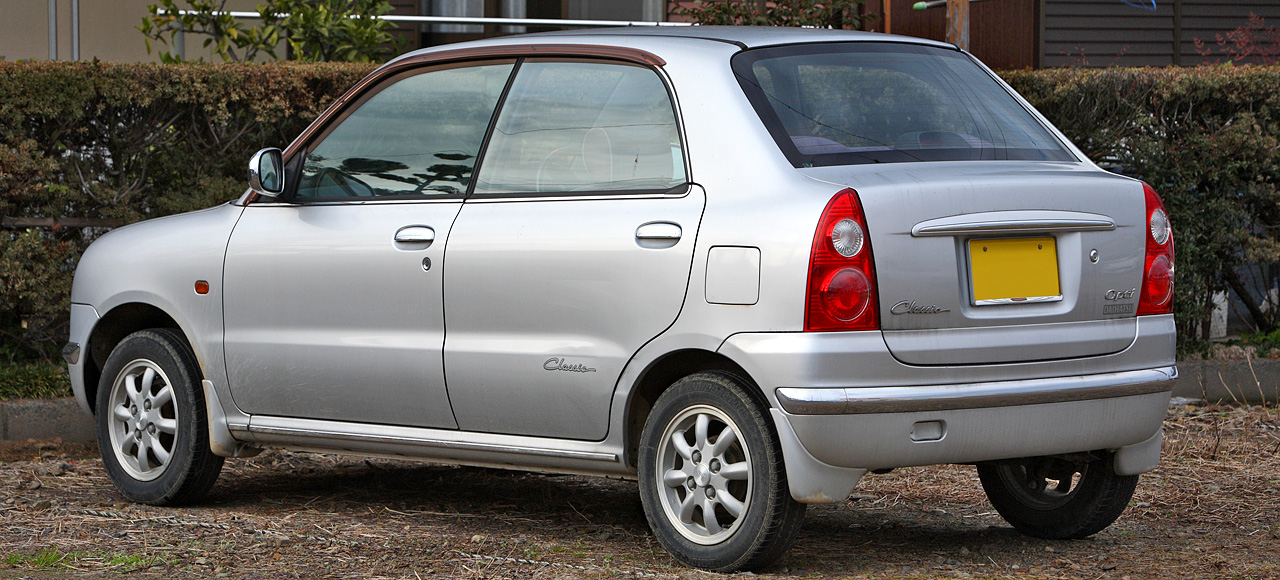
Opti Classic

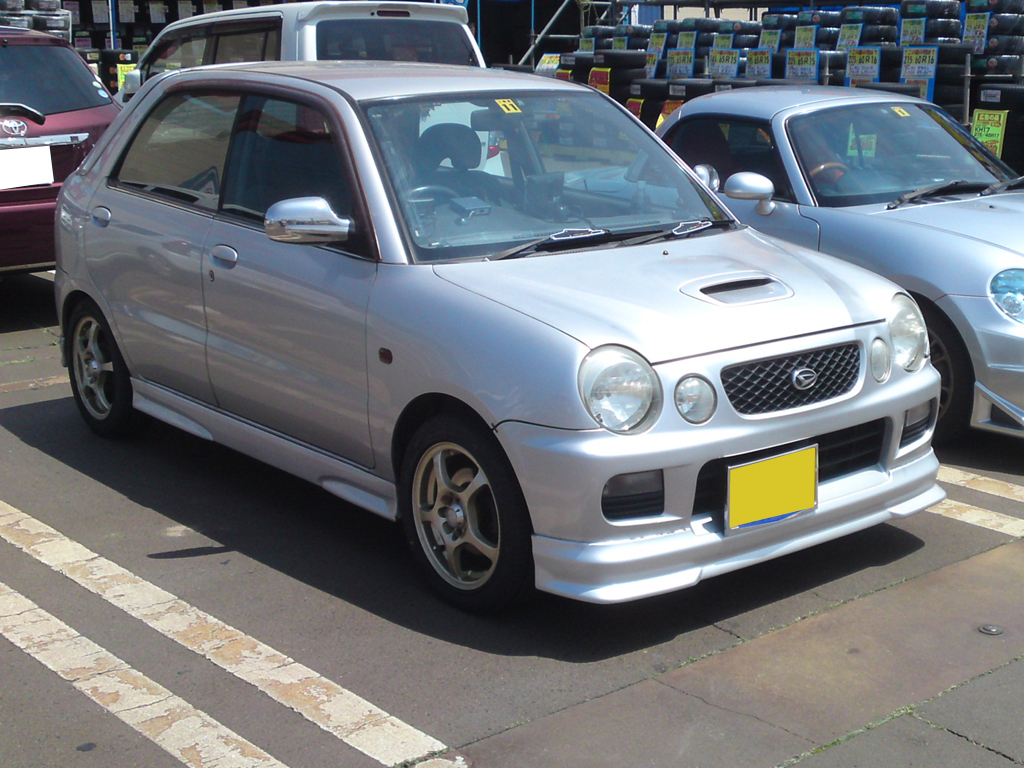
Opti Aerodown Beex
