= Daihatsu Leeza =

Daihatsu Leeza (L100/L111)
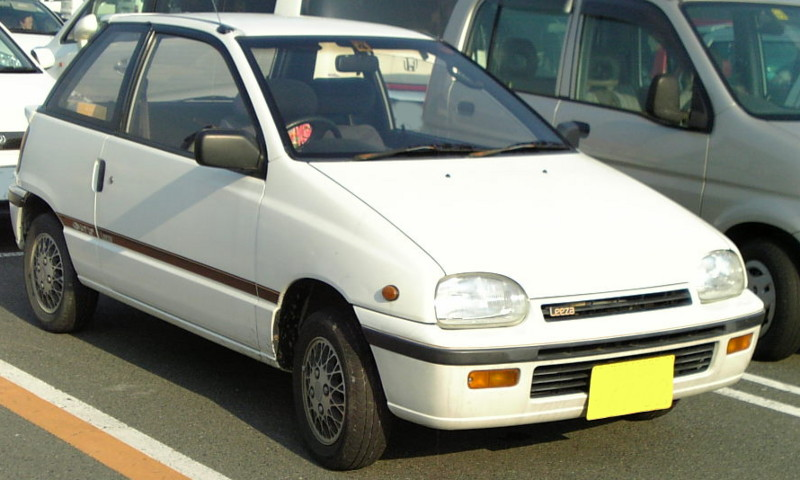

Overview
- Manufacturer: Daihatsu
- Production: 1986–1993
- Assembly: Japan

Body and chassis
- Class: Kei car
- Body style: 3-door hatchback; 2-door roadster (Leeza Spider)
- Layout: Front-engine, front-wheel-drive
- Related: Daihatsu Mira (L70/L80)

Powertrain
- Engine: Petrol: 547 cc EB10/50 I3 (L100); 547 cc EB21/26 turbo I3 (L100); 659 cc EF-HL I3 (L111); 659 cc EF-JL turbo I3 (L111)
- Transmission: 4-speed manual; 5-speed manual; 2-speed automatic; 3-speed automatic

Dimensions
- Wheelbase: 2,130 mm (83.9 in)
- Length: 3,195–3,295 mm (125.8–129.7 in)
- Width: 1,395 mm (54.9 in)
- Height: 1,335–1,355 mm (52.6–53.3 in)
- Curb weight: 570–660 kg (1,257–1,455 lb)

Chronology
- Successor: Daihatsu Opti; Daihatsu Copen (Leeza Spider)

The Daihatsu Leeza (Japanese: ダイハツ・リーザ, Hepburn: Daihatsu Rīza) is a kei car with semi-coupé styling manufactured by Daihatsu. It was launched in Japan in December 1986, and discontinued in August 1993 after had been largely replaced by the Opti in 1992. While having coupé lines, most of the Leezas sold in Japan were technically commercial vehicles (with strapping points and temporary rear seats) to take advantage of ample tax breaks for such vehicles.

== 550 cc model (L100) ==
Power output from the carburetted 547 cc EB-series three-cylinder engines were originally either 33 or 50 PS (24 or 37 kW), depending on whether a turbocharger was fitted. In late 1987, a limited edition variant called Cha Cha was introduced, aimed at women around the age of 30 and only available in black with discreet red pinstripes and equipped with standard air conditioning. In January 1989, the TR-ZZ variant, a fuel-injected 64 PS (47 kW) version was added, followed by Club Sports edition in October which offered lowered suspension and body kits. At the 1989 Tokyo Motor Show, a prototype two-seat "Leeza Spider" was shown.

Reviewers said while the Leeza offered a modern and clean design for its time, and with an airy interior, the sloping rear glasshouse made the rear seat rather cramped. The front seats were claimed spacious, but at the expense of the rear space — fitting four adults in the Leeza would not be comfortable for any of them. The 24 kW (32 hp; 33 PS) version (with a five-speed manual transmission) went from 0–97 km/h (60 mph) in 21.3 seconds in a period British road test, reaching a top speed of 121 km/h (75 mph). Gas mileage when "driven hard" returned a fuel consumption of 41.3 mpg_{‑imp} (14.6 km/L; 34.4 mpg_{‑US}), although one could expect much higher with some economising. In short, all design parameters of the Leeza were designed with city use in mind, making it not very well suited to highway use.

== 660 cc model (L111) ==
In March 1990, the kei car regulations changed. Unlike its competitor, the Cervo, Daihatsu chose to update the Leeza, giving it an updated chassis code L111. The 660 cc Leeza, arriving a little later than its more popular sibling the Mira, in August 1990, was available in R, Cha Cha and OXY trim lines. The Cha Cha became a regularly available model rather than a special edition. The larger engine and slightly enlarged bodywork made for a more usable car, and allowed for the fitment of more safety equipment. The standard engine was a naturally aspirated, carburetted single-cam engine with four valves per cylinder, producing 50 PS (37 kW). However, the tax advantages for "faux" commercial vehicles had shrunk to the point of irrelevance, and the updated Leeza was only sold as a passenger car, limiting its market.

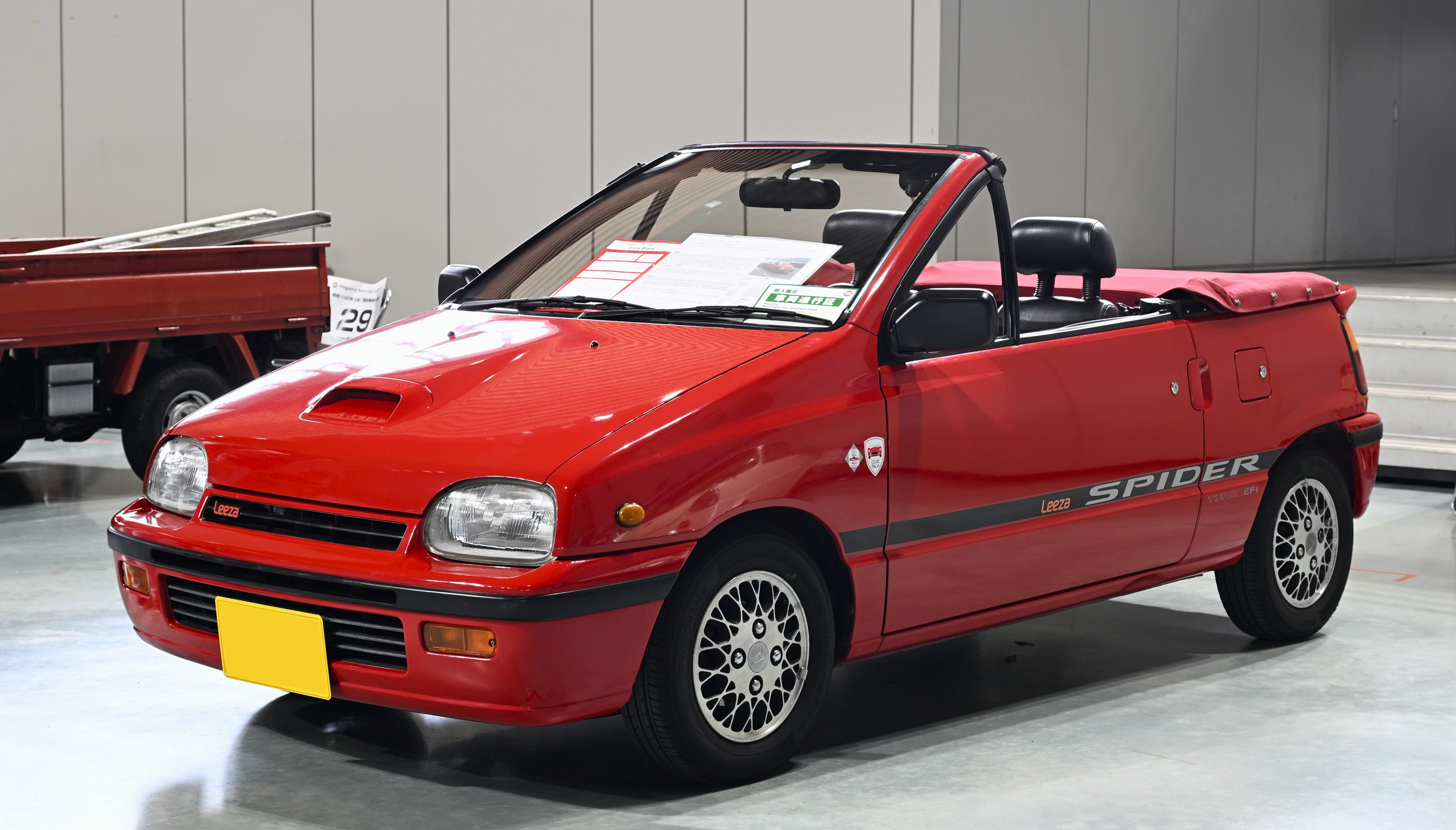

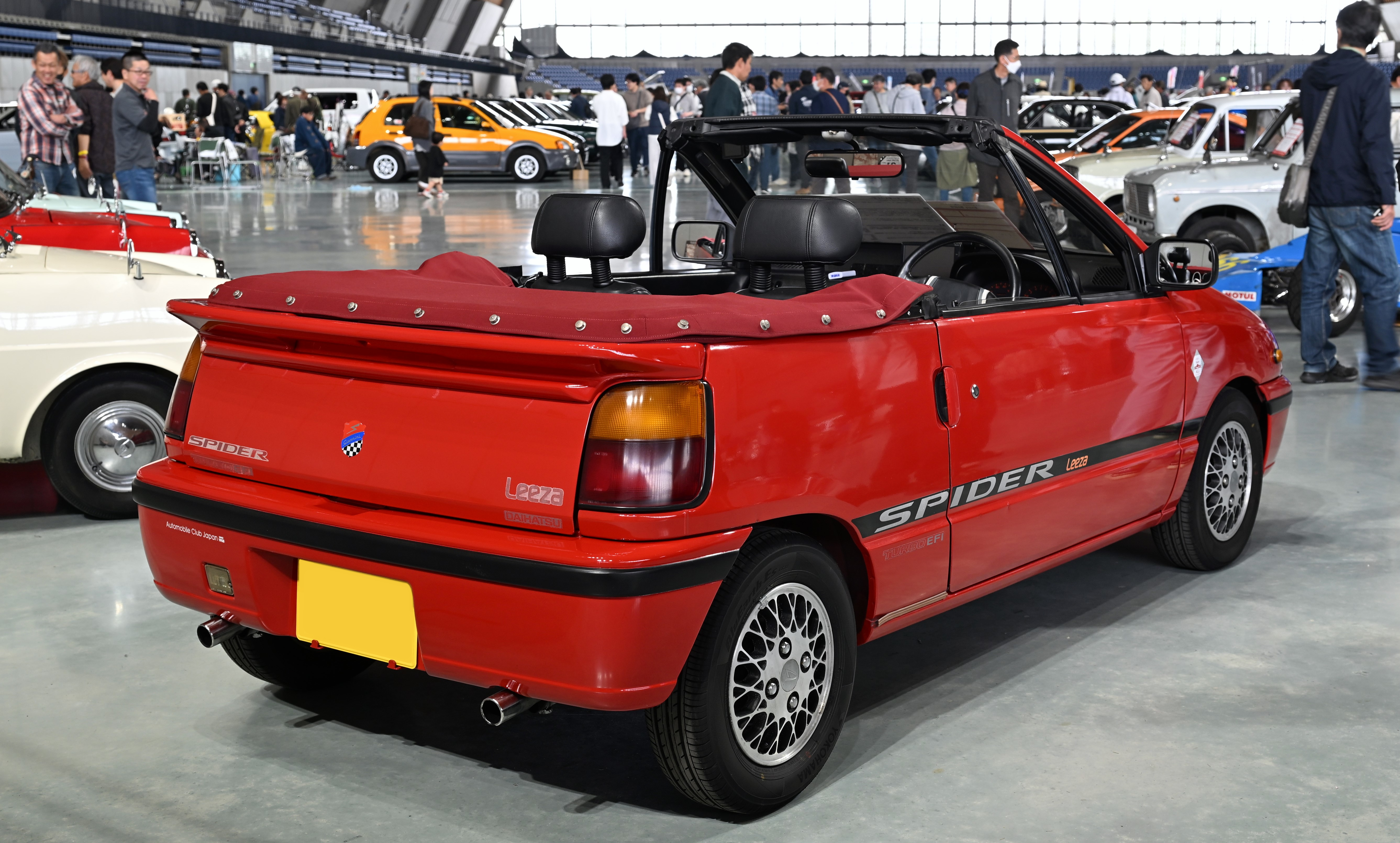
1990 Leeza Spider, with the scooped turbo hood

Five months after the update, the turbocharged OXY-R (with the maximum 64 PS (47 kW) allowed to kei cars) arrived, with a prominent hood vent for the intercooler. Daihatsu also went through the effort of making the two-seat roadster version of the Leeza called the "Leeza Spider" ready for production. It was previewed by a 1991 concept car called the FX-228; this was essentially a production-ready Leeza Spider fitted with a different front bumper and some other eye-catching body modifications. It was first shown at the 1991 Geneva Auto Salon. The production version of the Spider (chassis code L111SK), only fitted with the turbocharged engine, arrived in November 1991 and lasted until the end of production in August 1993. The Spider received a standard leather interior.

Production ceased in 1993, with a successor model, the Opti being released the previous year.
