= Darvishi, Bushehr =

Village in Bushehr province, Iran

Darvishi Persian: درويشي
- Village
- Location within Iran
- Coordinates: 28°19′19″N 51°47′52″E
- Country: Iran
- Province: Bushehr
- County: Dashti
- District: Shonbeh and Tasuj
- Rural District: Shonbeh

Population (2016)
  - Total: 426
- Time zone: UTC+3:30 (IRST)

Darvishi (Persian: درويشي) (Note: Also romanized as Darvīshī; also known as Darinshi, Darvīahi, and Darvīshān) is a village in Shonbeh Rural District (Note: Formerly Shonbeh and Tasuj Rural District) of Shonbeh and Tasuj District in Dashti County, Bushehr province, Iran.

== Demographics ==
=== Population ===
At the time of the 2006 National Census, the village's population was 412 in 88 households. The following census in 2011 counted 340 people in 97 households. The 2016 census measured the population of the village as 426 people in 122 households.
