= Konar Torshan =

Village in Bushehr province, Iran

Konar Torshan Persian: کنار ترشان
- Village
- Location within Iran
- Coordinates: 28°04′42″N 51°44′41″E
- Country: Iran
- Province: Bushehr
- County: Deyr
- District: Abdan
- Rural District: Abdan

Population (2016)
  - Total: 230
- Time zone: UTC+3:30 (IRST)

Konar Torshan (Persian: كنار ترشان) (Note: Also romanized as Kenar Torshan and Konār Torshān) is a village in Abdan Rural District of Abdan District in Deyr County, Bushehr province, Iran.

== Demographics ==
=== Population ===
At the time of the 2006 National Census, the village's population was 256 in 44 households, when it was in the Central District. The following census in 2011 counted 251 people in 53 households. The 2016 census measured the population of the village as 230 people in 59 households, by which time the rural district had been separated from the district in the formation of Abdan District. It was the most populous village in its rural district.
