= Perodua Kenari =

Malaysian city car

Perodua Kenari (L900)
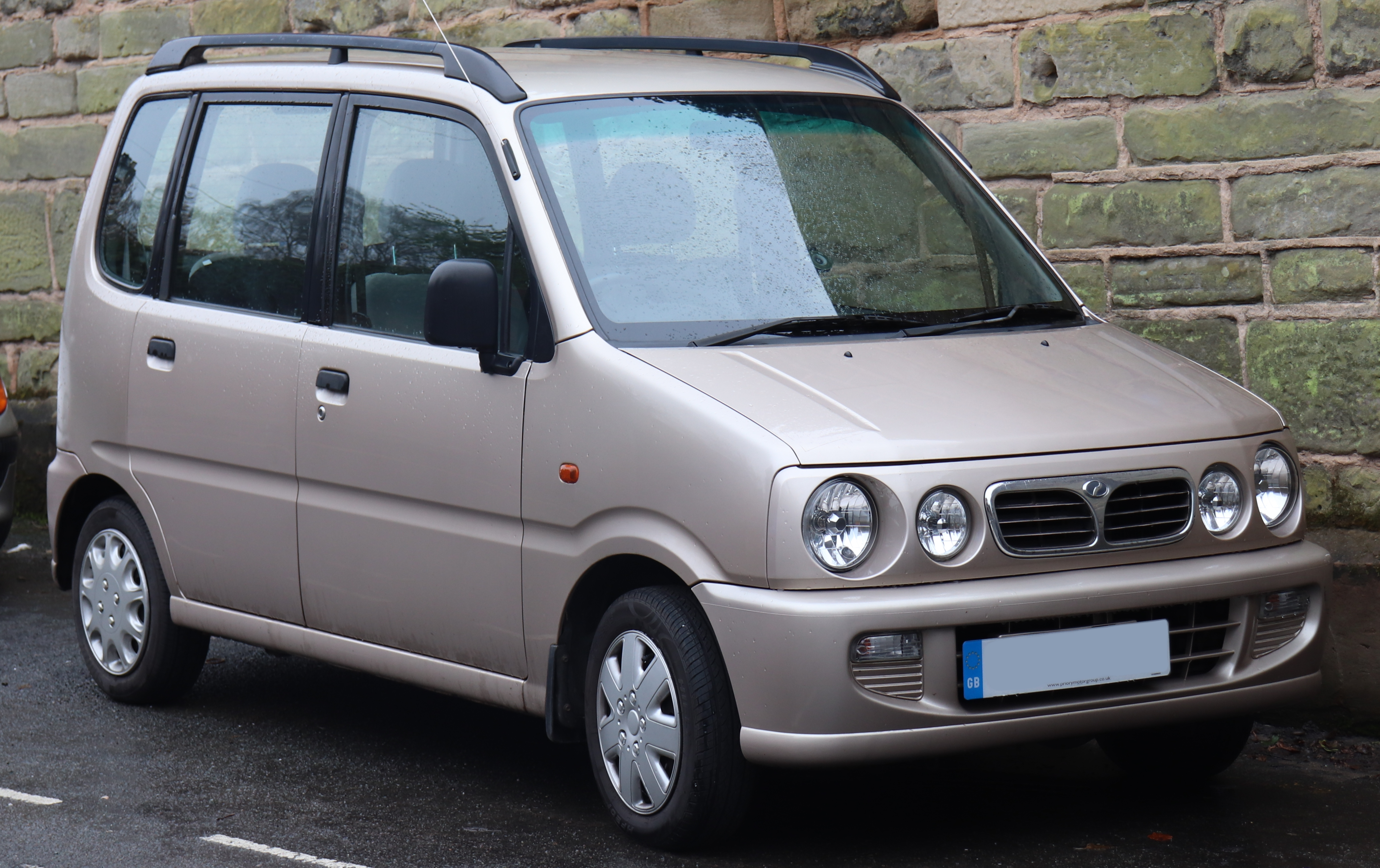

Overview
- Manufacturer: Perodua
- Also called: Daihatsu Move (L900)
- Production: 2000–2009
- Assembly: Malaysia: Rawang, Selangor

Body and chassis
- Class: City car
- Body style: 5-door hatchback
- Layout: Front-engine, front-wheel-drive

Powertrain
- Engine: Petrol: 1.0 L EJ-DE DOHC I3
- Transmission: 5-speed manual; 4-speed automatic

Dimensions
- Wheelbase: 2,360 mm (92.9 in)
- Length: 3,460 mm (136.2 in)
- Width: 1,500 mm (59.1 in)
- Height: 1,660 mm (65.4 in)
- Kerb weight: 865–880 kg (1,907–1,940 lb)

The Perodua Kenari is a city car produced by Malaysian automotive company Perodua. The Kenari is based on the second generation Daihatsu Move kei car (minicar) with a 990 cc DOHC engine powering it. The name Kenari is a Malaysian name equivalent to the word canary, which translates to joy and freedom.

== History ==
The Perodua Kenari was launched in 2000 with three variants: EX (Standard) (5-speed manual), GX (Deluxe) (5-speed manual) and EZ (4-speed automatic).

In April 2003, Perodua introduced the facelift model. Changes included new headlights, a new front grille and a 14" alloy wheel design that became standard throughout the 4-model range: GX, EZ, EZ Special (EZS) and GX Aero. The GX Aero was offered only with a manual transmission and was only available in Mistik Red. It had a body kit consisting of side skirts, a different spoiler and different styling for the rear lighting units. The interior of the GX Aero featured "cubic" printing on the centre dashboard console surfaces.

In September 2003, the company showed a hybrid version of the Perodua Kenari that didn't make it to production. The prototype used a 659 cc petrol engine which produced 30 kW/41 bhp of power and 57 Nm of torque, coupled to an electric motor that generated 18 kW/25 bhp of power and 100 Nm of torque.

In November 2006, the company introduced the Perodua Kenari RS.

Perodua ended production and sales of the Kenari in 2009 with no direct replacement model.

== Variants ==
=== Malaysia ===
Model years	Variant (Known As)	Transmission
2000 - 2003 (between March and ?)	EX (Standard)	Manual
2000 - ?	GX (Deluxe)	Manual
2003 - ?	GX Aero (Aerosport)	Manual
2004 - 2006	GX Kasih (Kasih)	Manual
2000 - 2004	EZ (DOHC)	Automatic
2005 - 2008	EZ Aero (Aerosport)	Automatic
2004 - 2006	EZ Kasih (Kasih)	Automatic
2002	EZ Limited Edition	Automatic
2003 - ?	EZS (EZ Special)	Automatic
August 2002 - 2004	SE (Special Edition)	Automatic
2006 - ?	RS	Automatic

== Gallery ==
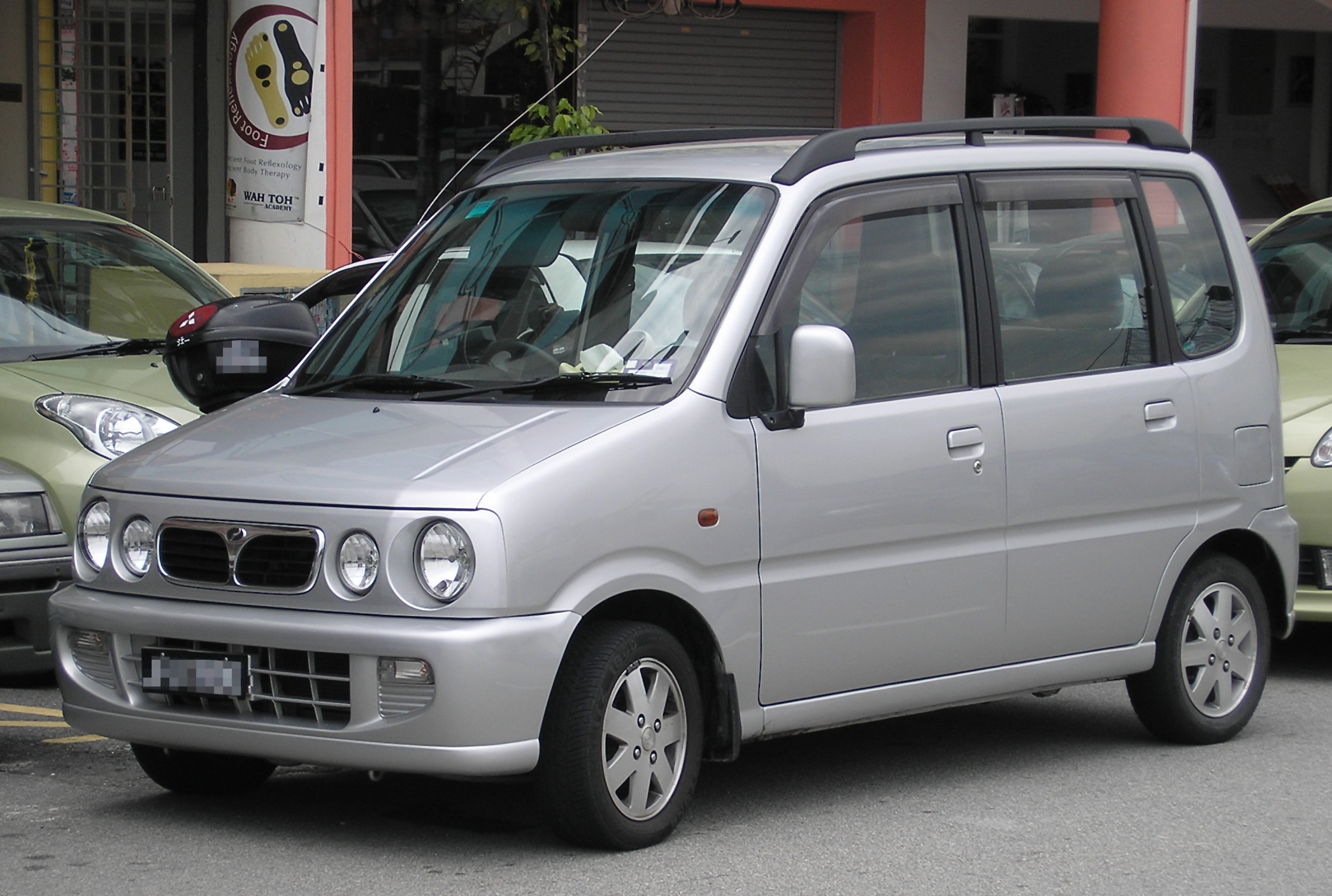
2000-2003 Pre-facelift (front)

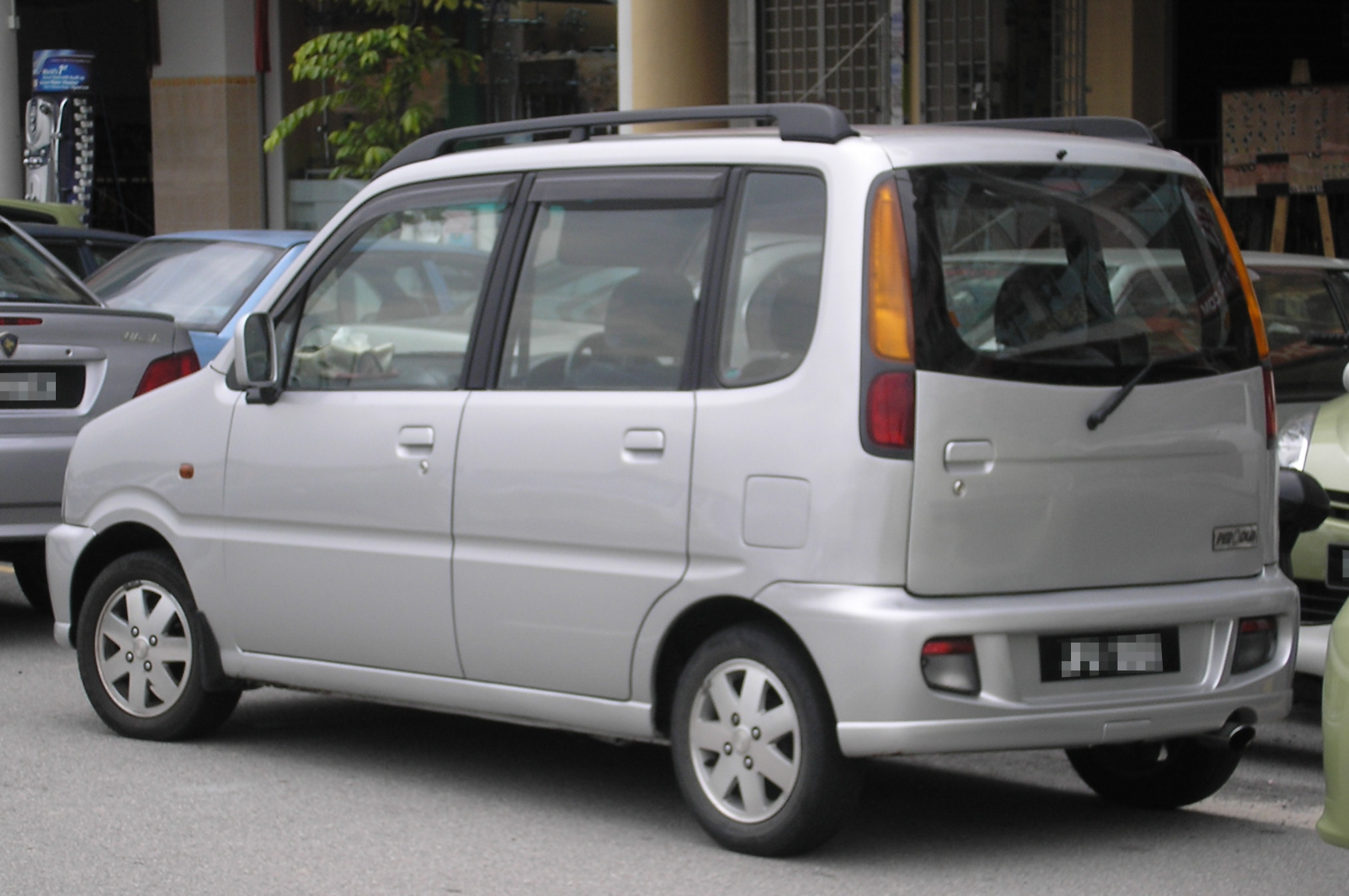
2000-2003 Pre-facelift (rear)

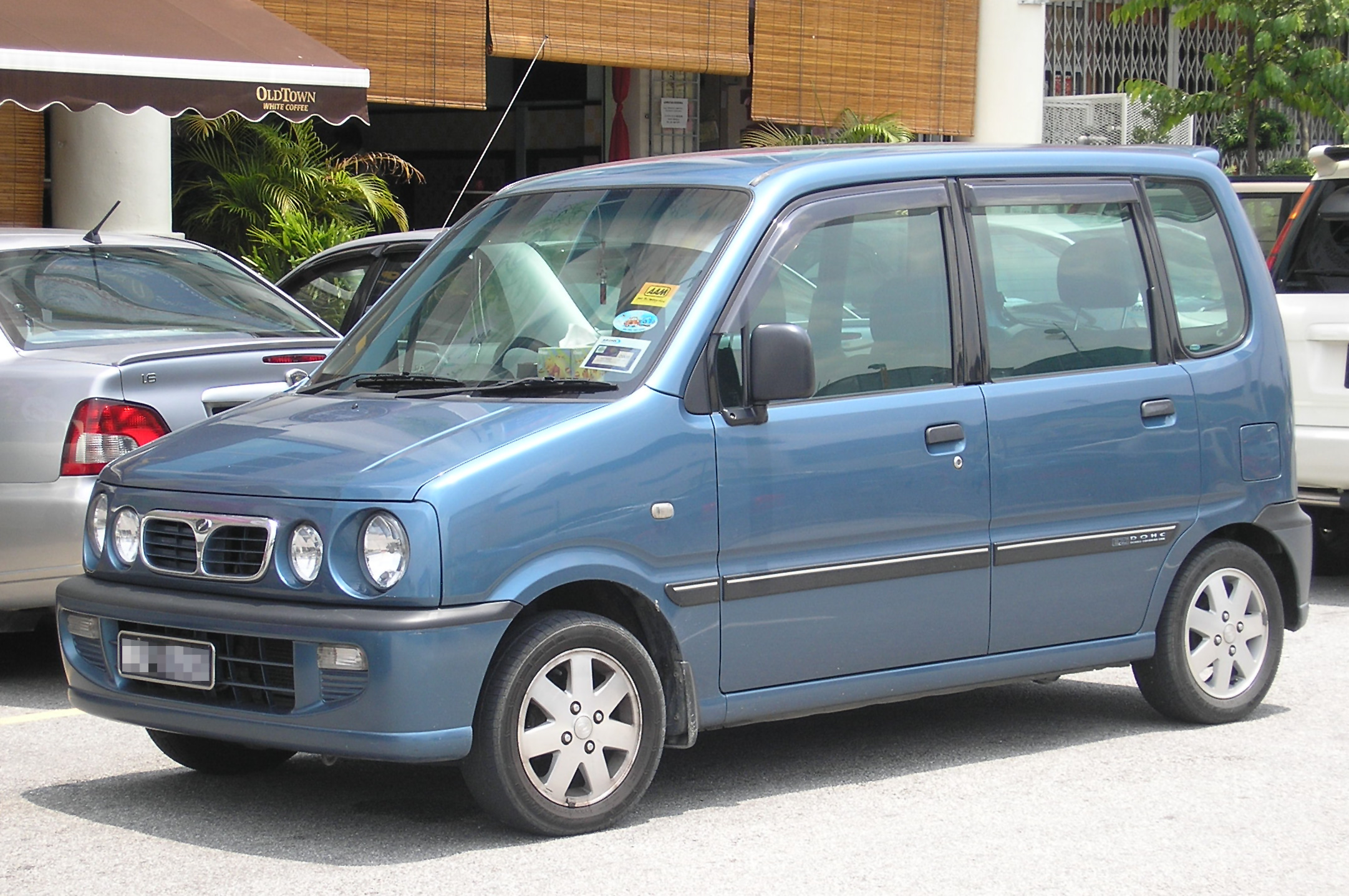
2000-2003 Pre-facelift (front)

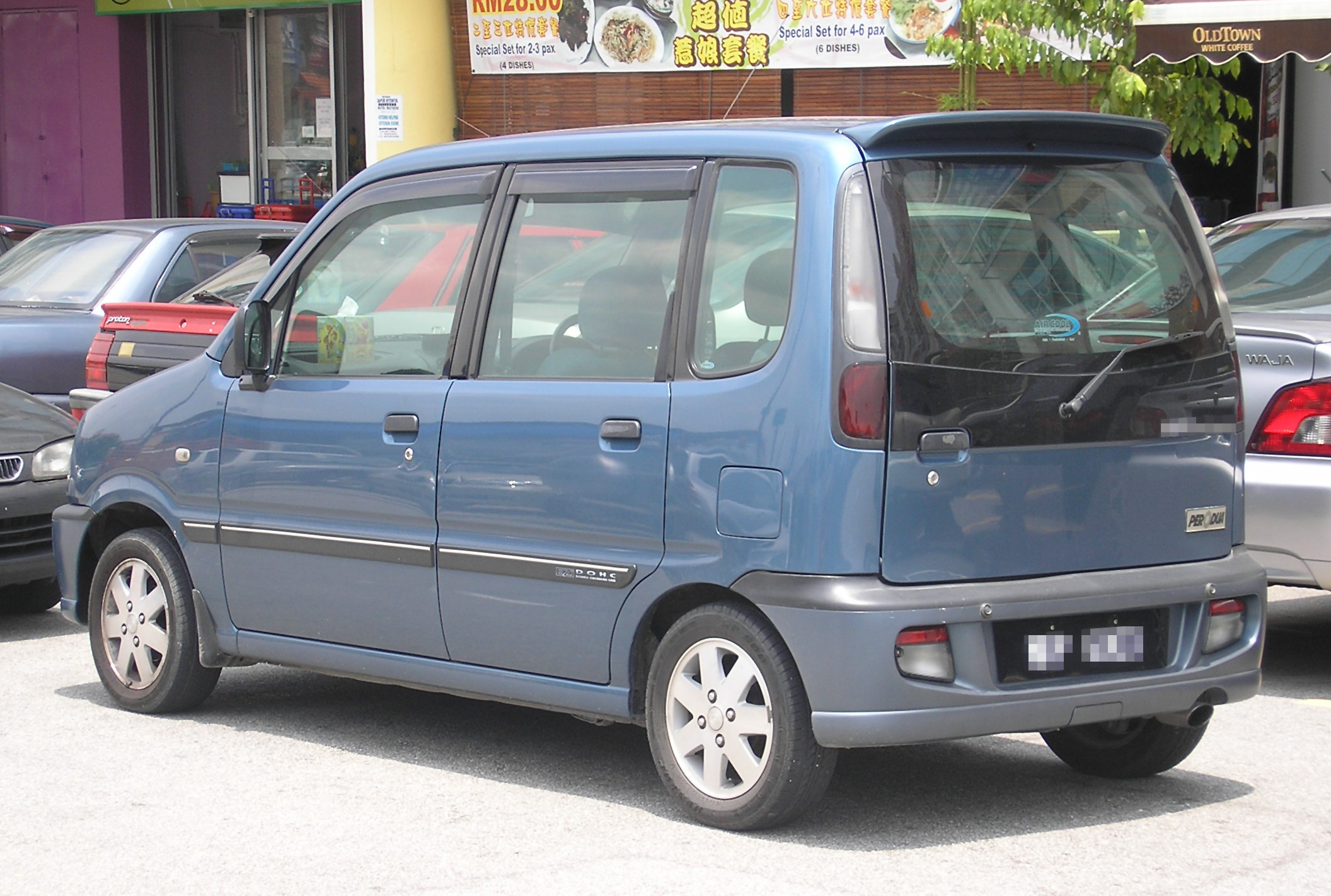
2000-2003 Pre-facelift (rear)

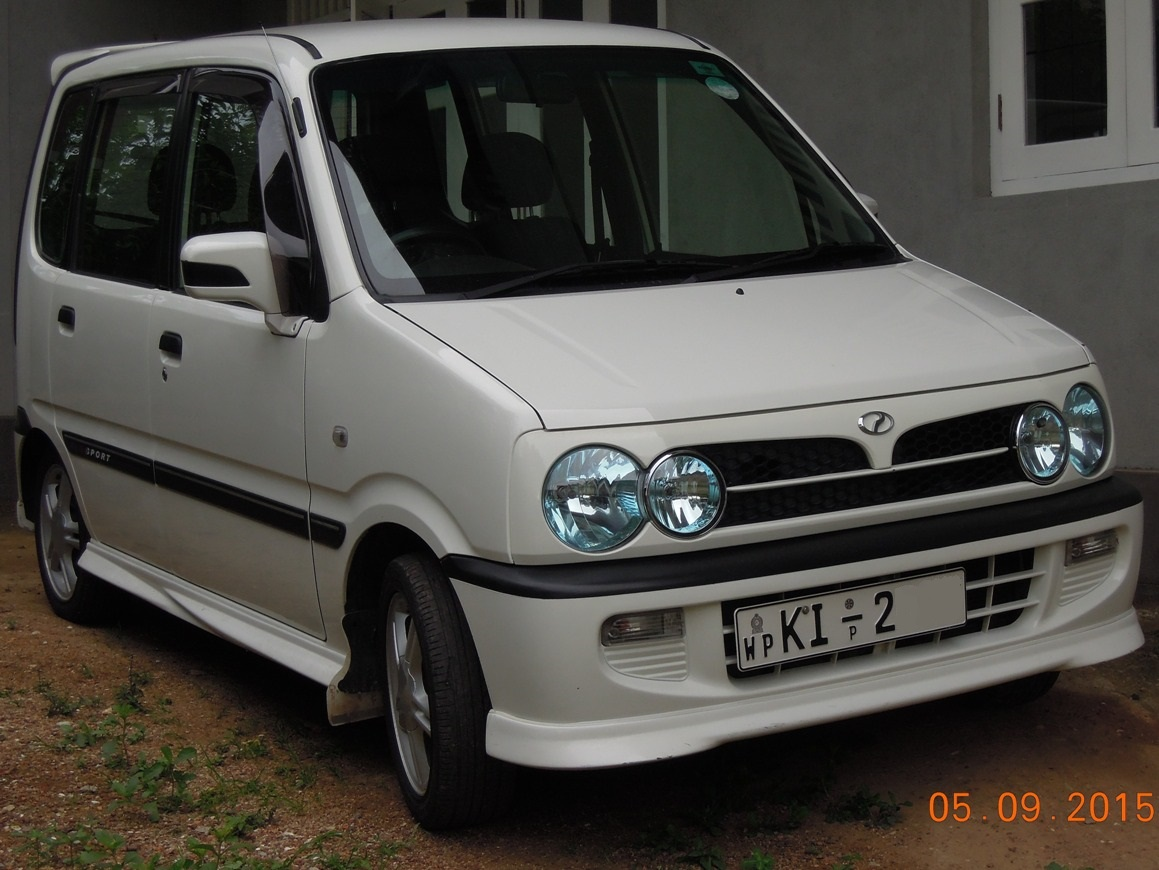
Facelift, Aero/AeroSport (front)

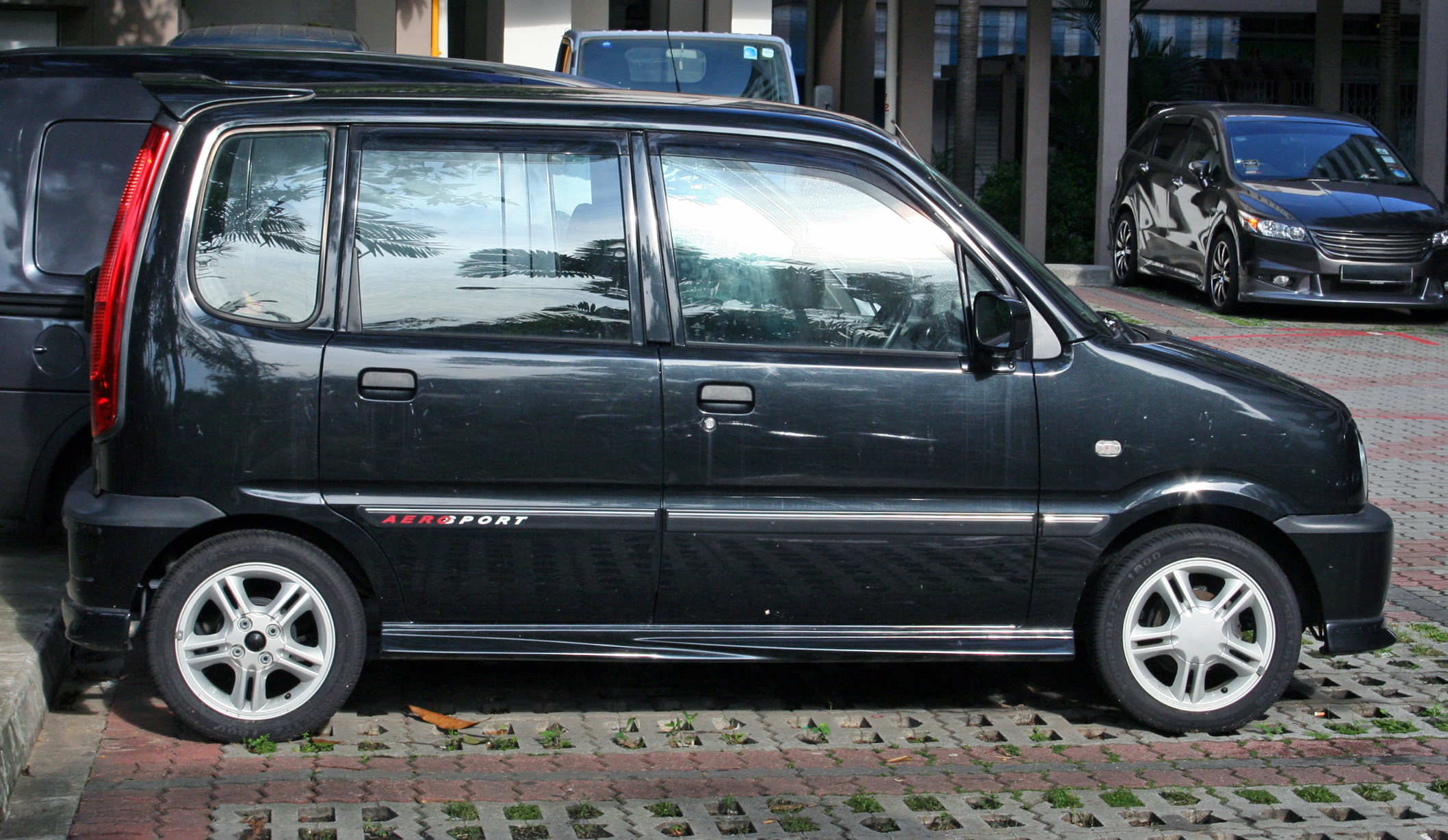
Facelift, Aero/AeroSport (side)

=== Export ===
Perodua exported the Kenari to the United Kingdom in two variants: GX and EZ.

== Powertrain ==
Manufacturer's claims
Engine	989 cc EJ-DE
Format	DOHC 12V I3
Total displacement (cc)	989
Bore x Stroke (mm x mm)	72.0 x 81.0
Maximum Output [hp(kW)/rpm]	54 (40.3) / 5,200
Maximum Torque (Nm/rpm)	88 / 3,200
Maximum Speed (km/h)	155 km/h
Acceleration 0–100 km/h (sec)	12.5
Fuel efficiency	4.8l / 100km (highway: 80km/H constant)

== Sales ==
Year	Malaysia
2000	7,838
2001	9,915
2002	14,327
2003	19,470
2004	25,443
2005	20,354
2006	11,886
2007	5,824
2008	3,698
2009	2,060
