= Konar-e Khoshk =

Konar-e Khoshk كنارخشك
- Village
- Location within Iran
- Coordinates: 29°28′56″N 51°49′15″E
- Country: Iran
- Province: Fars
- County: Kazerun
- Bakhsh: Jereh and Baladeh
- Rural District: Famur

Population (2006)
  - Total: 293
- Time zone: UTC+3:30 (IRST)
  - Summer (DST): UTC+4:30 (IRDT)

Konar-e Khoshk (Persian: كنارخشك, also Romanized as Konār-e Khoshk and Konār Khoshk) is a village in Famur Rural District, Jereh and Baladeh District, Kazerun County, Fars province, Iran. At the 2006 census, its population was 293, in 59 families.
