= Sarmastan, Gilan =

Sarmastan سرمستان
- Village
- Location within Iran
- Coordinates: 37°05′53″N 50°18′25″E
- Country: Iran
- Province: Gilan
- County: Rudsar
- Bakhsh: Central
- Rural District: Reza Mahalleh

Population (2006)
  - Total: 94
- Time zone: UTC+3:30 (IRST)
  - Summer (DST): UTC+4:30 (IRDT)

Sarmastan (Persian: سرمستان, also Romanized as Sarmastān) is a village in Reza Mahalleh Rural District, in the Central District of Rudsar County, Gilan Province, Iran. At the 2006 census, its population was 94, in 26 families.
