= Konari, Deyr =

Konari كناري
- Village
- Location within Iran
- Coordinates: 28°11′58″N 51°34′03″E
- Country: Iran
- Province: Bushehr
- County: Deyr
- Bakhsh: Bord Khun
- Rural District: Abkosh

Population (2006)
  - Total: 342
- Time zone: UTC+3:30 (IRST)
  - Summer (DST): UTC+4:30 (IRDT)

Konari (Persian: كناري, also Romanized as Konārī and Kenari; also known as Kināri) is a village in Abkosh Rural District, Bord Khun District, Deyr County, Bushehr Province, Iran. At the 2006 census, its population was 342, in 67 families.
