= Zaviyeh Hajjian =

Zaviyeh Hajian زاويه حاجيان
- Village
- Location within Iran
- Coordinates: 32°18′50″N 48°19′06″E
- Country: Iran
- Province: Khuzestan
- County: Dezful
- Bakhsh: Central
- Rural District: Qeblehi

Population (2006)
  - Total: 295
- Time zone: UTC+3:30 (IRST)
  - Summer (DST): UTC+4:30 (IRDT)

Zaviyeh Hajian (Persian: زاويه حاجيان, also Romanized as Zāvīyeh Ḩājīān and Zāveyeh Ḩājeyān; also known as Konārī) is a village in Qeblehi Rural District, in the Central District of Dezful County, Khuzestan Province, Iran. At the 2006 census, its population was 295, in 57 families.
