= Konar, Chuvashia =

Coordinates: 55°51′47″N 47°42′39″E

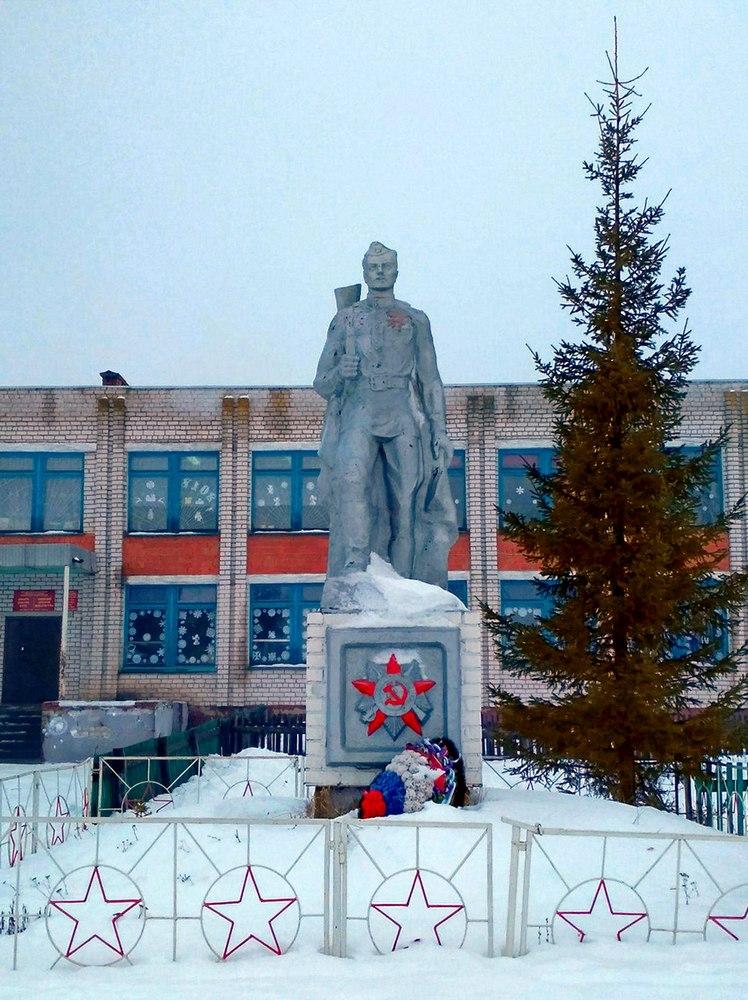
A monument to soldiers who fell in World War II on Shkolnaya Street, Konar

Konar (Russian: Конар; Chuvash: Кăнар, Kănar) is a settlement in Tsivilsky District, the center of Konarskoe Rural Settlement, in the Chuvash Republic, Russia.

Located at the distance of 57 km to Cheboksary, 20 km to Tsivilsk, the settlement was founded on November 18, 1961, on the basis of the Tingovatovo oil pumping station. Konar is a constituent entity of the Tsivilsky District since 1961.

== Etymology ==
Ethnologist I. S. Dubanov notes the following: "M.N. Yuhma in the book "Ancient Bulgaro-Chuvashes" writes that Konar is a Bulgaro-Chuvash hero".

In the article dedicated to the Konar river I. S. Dubanov writes: "The river in Tsivilsky District, the left inflow of the Anish river. Presumably from Kazakh. Konur, konyr "dark, grey-brown, brown". In the dictionary of V. V. Radlov konyran means "steppe", hence "steppe river".

== Administrative and territorial division ==
The settlement was founded in 1961, it is part of the Tsivilsky District of Chuvashia since 18.11.1961.

In various years the settlement was part of the following administrative units: from 18.11.1961 - Imburtsky Village Council; from 1962 - Staroaktashevsky Village Council; from 1992 - Staroaktashevskaya Rural Administration; from 17.11.2005 - Konarskoe Rural Settlement (formed from Staroaktashevskaya and Khoramalinskaya Rural Administrations).

== General information ==
The village has gas and water supply, pavement. Chuvashes constitute the majority of the population. The number of households and residents of Konar: 1979 - 183 men, 207 women; 2002 - 242 households, 816 residents: 404 men, 412 women; 2007 - 259 households, 700 residents; 2010 - 248 households, 743 residents: 355 men, 388 women; 2011 - 269 households, 755 residents; 2012 - 278 households, 741 residents; 2013 - 278 households, 729 residents; 2014 - 278 households, 728 residents.

Population of Konarskoe Rural Settlement (includes settlement of Konar, village of Bolshye Kryshki, village of Vtorye Toyzy, village of Kileykasi, village of Lesnye Kryshki, village of Novoe Aktashevo, village of Staroe Aktashevo, village of Khoramaly, village of Khutor Shinery) in 2016 is 1505 residents, in 2017 - 1459 residents. For the above years there is no separate data for the settlement of Konar.

== Organizations present in Konar ==
- NPS Tingovatovo (OAO Severo-Zapadnye Magystralnye Nefteprovody)
- Substation Tingovatovo (OAO Sredne-Volzhsky Transnefteprodukt)
- Distributing unit of the Cheboksary oil depot
- Khunav kindergarten
- MOU Konar secondary school
- District hospital
- Veterinary station
- Two telephone communication centres
- Post office
- Bank subdivision
- Cultural centre
- Library
- Ethnographic museum

== Sights of interest ==
- Monument to the Unknown Soldier
- Eternal Fire Complex in the village of Vtorye Toyzy;
- Memorial plaque to Ermakov M.A.

== History ==
The history of the village is connected with the creation of the oil pumping station "Tingovatovo". In 1957, the first Almetievsk-Gorky oil pipeline with the diameter of 500 mm was laid in Chuvashia. An emergency brigade was organized for the maintenance of the pipeline located in the village of Vtorye Toyzy (now part of Konarskoe Rural Settlement). By 1960, a pumping station and a substation were built. Unit No. 2 was installed and started its operation on March 6, 1961, for pumping oil. On March 28, 1961, order No. 34 was issued on the formation of NPS Tingovatovo (Tingovatovo Oil Pumping Station). Mikhailov Fyodor Mikhailovich was the first head of NPS Tingovatovo. At the current location of Konar there was forest with the same name, and a field. By the autumn of 1961 the construction of a residential complex was completed: 15 two-family houses from slag blocks. The village was named after the neighbouring forest. Until 1965, the settlement was mostly inhabited only by the station workers with their families. From the first days of foundation of the settlement, there were such organizations as the cultural centre (SDK), kindergarten, elementary school, shop, post office, bathhouse (banya). The nearest hospital was twenty kilometers away. In 1966 a district hospital was opened in the renovated barracks for builders. In 1972, road construction of 9 km with access to the highway was completed. Now there are regular buses running between Konar and the capital city of Cheboksary. In December 1979, Konar secondary school was opened. In 1992, a new cultural centre for 360 seats with a gymnasium was opened. Gradually, other institutions were founded, such as a distributing unit (gas pipeline), Tingovatovo (oil pumping station), AGRES (automatic gas distributor), veterinary station, bakery (currently out of operation - 2017), post office, telephone communication centre.

On 27 September 2025, it was reported that the Tingovatovo oil pumping station had been hit by Ukrainian long-range drones during the Russo-Ukrainian war.

== Leisure and everyday life ==
Residents of the settlement are engaged in various sports. There is a volleyball section for all categories of residents. There are skiing events, for example, "Ski Track of Russia", sports days for district schools. The cultural centre (SDK) organizes cultural events, such as celebration of the New Year, Farewell to Winter, festive concerts, Village Day, etc. In the evening, leisure activities are organized in SDK: billiards, table tennis, interest clubs. There is a library, which also organizes literature events and competitions. The majority of inhabitants have personal plots and subsidiary farms. Residents also engage in fishing, hunting, gathering berries, mushrooms and nuts.

== Settlement residents marked by government awards ==
- Valentina Aleksandrovna Belova - Honoured Teacher of the ChASSR
- Alevtina Alexandrovna Klementyeva - Award for excellence in public education of the RSFSR
- Zinaida Porfirevna Rumyantseva - Honoured Worker of the Agriculture of the Cuvash Republic
- Guriy Fedorovich Alekseev – Honoured Worker of the Music Society of the Cuvash Republic
- Vera Filippovna Alekseeva – Honoured Worker of the Music Society of the Cuvash Republic
- Muza Nikolaevna Grigoryeva - Award for excellence in public education of the RSFSR
- Angelina Nikolaevna Steklova - Honoured Worker of Agriculture
- Pyotr Sergeevich Chizhov - Honoured Worker of Agriculture
- Valentina Borisovna Ivanova - Award for excellence in public education
- Larisa Veniaminovna Sidiryakova - Honoured Worker of Culture of the Chuvash Republic

== Participants of the Second World War ==
- Belov Konstantin Semenovich
- Chizhov Sergey Egorovich
- Vasiliev Alexandr Vasilyevich
- Alekseev Grgory Alekseevich

== Traces of war ==
On the territory of the state farm "Sputnik", not far from the villages of Imburti and Toyzy of the Tsivilsky District (during the years of the war - Oktyabrsky District), on February 11, 1944, a military aircraft of American manufacture "Airacobra" crashed in the forest. 35 years after the accident, students of the secondary school under the guidance of the historian and teacher Pavlov Averkiy Nikolaevich and Pavlova Lidia Mikhailovna studied the causes of the death of the aircraft and ascertained the personality of the pilot.

Nine fighter aircraft of the brand "Airacobra" from the 20th reserve aviation regiment, based in the city of Sverdlovsk, flew out of the airfield and headed for Ivanovo. This was the task of the State Defense Committee to deliver Lend-Lease fighters for the needs of the front. One of the aircraft did not reach its goal. The pilot of the crashed plane, Ermakov Mikhail Alexandrovich, is buried in the cemetery of Vtorye Toyzy.

A monument to the Unknown Soldier is erected in the settlement. On Victory Day, schoolchildren annually lay a wreath at it, honoring the memory of the soldiers who never returned from the front.

== Sources ==
- Елахова, В. И., Юманова У.В. Конар//Чувашская энциклопедия
- Дубанов, И. С. Географические названия Чувашской Республики: краеведческий словарь. — Чебоксары: Чувашское книжное издательство, 2010
