= Konar-e Naru =

Konar-e Naru كنارنرو
- Village
- Location within Iran
- Coordinates: 28°46′54″N 51°13′37″E
- Country: Iran
- Province: Bushehr
- County: Tangestan
- Bakhsh: Central
- Rural District: Baghak

Population (2006)
  - Total: 113
- Time zone: UTC+3:30 (IRST)
  - Summer (DST): UTC+4:30 (IRDT)

Konar-e Naru (Persian: كنارنرو, also Romanized as Konār-e Narū; also known as Konān Derow, Konānrow, and Konār-e Rū) is a village in Baghak Rural District, in the Central District of Tangestan County, Bushehr Province, Iran. At the 2006 census, its population was 113, in 25 families.
