= Tasuj Rural District (Dashti County) =

Rural district in Bushehr province, Iran

Tasuj Rural District Persian: دهستان طسوج
- Rural District
- Location within Iran
- Coordinates: 28°32′N 51°51′E
- Country: Iran
- Province: Bushehr
- County: Dashti
- District: Shonbeh and Tasuj
- Established: 2005
- Capital: Sarmak

Population (2016)
  - Total: 1,066
- Time zone: UTC+3:30 (IRST)

Tasuj Rural District (Persian: دهستان طسوج) is in Shonbeh and Tasuj District of Dashti County, Bushehr province, Iran. Its capital is the village of Sarmak.

== Demographics ==
=== Population ===
At the time of the 2006 National Census, the rural district's population was 947 in 224 households. There were 921 inhabitants in 233 households at the following census of 2011. The 2016 census measured the population of the rural district as 1,066 in 311 households. The most populous of its 13 villages was Sarmak, with 291 people.

=== Other villages in the rural district ===
- Dasht-e Palang
- Dehuk
