= Konar Esmail =

Konar Esmail كناراسماعيل
- Village
- Location within Iran
- Coordinates: 27°00′08″N 57°00′29″E
- Country: Iran
- Province: Hormozgan
- County: Minab
- Bakhsh: Central
- Rural District: Band-e Zarak

Population (2006)
  - Total: 701
- Time zone: UTC+3:30 (IRST)
  - Summer (DST): UTC+4:30 (IRDT)

Konar Esmail (Persian: كناراسماعيل, also Romanized as Konār Esmā‘īl, Kenār Esmā‘īl, Konār-e Esmā‘īl) is a village in Band-e Zarak Rural District, in the Central District of Minab County, Hormozgan Province, Iran. At the 2006 census, its population was 701, in 117 families.
