= Konar Tanku =

Konar Tanku كنارتنكو
- Village
- Location within Iran
- Coordinates: 26°56′08″N 55°15′25″E
- Country: Iran
- Province: Hormozgan
- County: Bandar Lengeh
- Bakhsh: Central
- Rural District: Dezhgan

Population (2006)
  - Total: 27
- Time zone: UTC+3:30 (IRST)
  - Summer (DST): UTC+4:30 (IRDT)

Konar Tanku (Persian: كنارتنكو, also Romanized as Konār Tankū; also known as Qanāt Tangū (Persian: قنات تنگو) and Konār Tangū-e Vasaţ) is a village in Dezhgan Rural District, in the Central District of Bandar Lengeh County, Hormozgan Province, Iran. At the 2006 census, its population was 27, in 6 families.
