= Konar-e Torsh =

Konar-e Torsh كنارترش
- Village
- Location within Iran
- Coordinates: 27°05′17″N 57°03′07″E
- Country: Iran
- Province: Hormozgan
- County: Minab
- Bakhsh: Central
- Rural District: Band-e Zarak

Population (2006)
  - Total: 1,798
- Time zone: UTC+3:30 (IRST)
  - Summer (DST): UTC+4:30 (IRDT)

Konar-e Torsh (Persian: كنارترش, also Romanized as Konār-e Torsh) is a village in Band-e Zarak Rural District, in the Central District of Minab County, Hormozgan Province, Iran. At the 2006 census, its population was 1,798, in 317 families.
