= Konar Siah, Bandar Abbas =

Konar Siah كنارسياه
- Village
- Location within Iran
- Coordinates: 27°38′17″N 56°45′56″E
- Country: Iran
- Province: Hormozgan
- County: Bandar Abbas
- Bakhsh: shamil
- Rural District: Shamil

Population (2006)
  - Total: 23
- Time zone: UTC+3:30 (IRST)
  - Summer (DST): UTC+4:30 (IRDT)

Konar Siah (Persian: كنارسياه, also Romanized as Konār Sīāh; also known as Konārsīyāh) is a village in Poshtkuh-e Shamil پشتکوه شمیل in Shamil Rural District, shamil District, Bandar Abbas County, Hormozgan Province, Iran. At the 2006 census, its population was 23, in 5 families.
