= Konar Bani =

Konar Bani كناربني
- Village
- Country: Iran
- Province: Bushehr
- County: Tangestan
- Bakhsh: Central
- Rural District: Ahram

Population (2006)
  - Total: 266
- Time zone: UTC+3:30 (IRST)
  - Summer (DST): UTC+4:30 (IRDT)

Konar Bani (Persian: كناربني, also Romanized as Konār Banī) is a village in Ahram Rural District, in the Central District of Tangestan County, Bushehr Province, Iran. At the 2006 census, its population was 266, in 67 families.
