= Cheshmeh Konari =

Cheshmeh Konari چشمه كناري
- Village
- Location within Iran
- Coordinates: 30°17′26″N 51°29′22″E
- Country: Iran
- Province: Fars
- County: Rostam
- Bakhsh: Central
- Rural District: Rostam-e Yek

Population (2006)
  - Total: 50
- Time zone: UTC+3:30 (IRST)
  - Summer (DST): UTC+4:30 (IRDT)

Cheshmeh Konari (Persian: چشمه كناري, also Romanized as Cheshmeh Konārī; also known as Konārī) is a village in Rostam-e Yek Rural District, in the Central District of Rostam County, Fars province, Iran. At the 2006 census, its population was 50, in 11 families.
