= Konar Siah, Qeshm =

Konar Siah كنارسياه
- Village
- Location within Iran
- Coordinates: 26°39′50″N 55°25′48″E
- Country: Iran
- Province: Hormozgan
- County: Qeshm
- Bakhsh: Shahab
- Rural District: Dulab

Population (2006)
  - Total: 324
- Time zone: UTC+3:30 (IRST)
  - Summer (DST): UTC+4:30 (IRDT)

Konar Siah (Persian: كنارسياه, also Romanized as Konār Sīāh, Konār-e Sīāh, Konār Seyāh; also known as Kūnār-e Sīāh, Kūnār Seyāh, and Kūnār Sīāh) is a village in Dulab Rural District, Shahab District, Qeshm County, Hormozgan Province, Iran. At the 2006 census, its population was 324, in 84 families.
