= Abdan =

City in Bushehr province, Iran

Abdan Persian: آبدان
- City
- Location within Iran
- Coordinates: 28°04′46″N 51°46′10″E
- Country: Iran
- Province: Bushehr
- County: Deyr
- District: Abdan
- Established as a city: 2000

Population (2016)
  - Total: 6,827
- Time zone: UTC+3:30 (IRST)

Abdan (Persian: آبدان) (Note: Also romanized as Ābdān; also known as Abdoon, Ābdūn, and Au Dan) is a city in, and the capital of, Abdan District in Deyr County, Bushehr province, Iran. It also serves as the administrative center for Abdan Rural District. The village of Abdan was converted to a city in 2000.

== Demographics ==
=== Language ===
Linguistic composition of the city consists of Persian dialects Bardesuni and Koroshi.

=== Population ===
At the time of the 2006 National Census, the city's population was 6,058 in 1,224 households, when it was in the Central District. The following census in 2011 counted 6,211 people in 1,477 households. The 2016 census measured the population of the city as 6,827 people in 1,819 households, by which time the city had been separated from the district in the formation of Abdan District.

== Notable people ==
Iranian cleric Abdullah Hajiani is from here.
