= Shonbeh Rural District =

Rural district in Bushehr province, Iran

Shonbeh Rural District Persian: دهستان شنبه
- Rural District
- Location within Iran
- Coordinates: 28°21′N 51°51′E
- Country: Iran
- Province: Bushehr
- County: Dashti
- District: Shonbeh and Tasuj
- Established: 1986
- Capital: Shonbeh

Population (2016)
  - Total: 4,808
- Time zone: UTC+3:30 (IRST)

Shonbeh Rural District (Persian: دهستان شنبه) (Note: Formerly Shonbeh and Tasuj Rural District (دهستان شنبه و طسوج)) is in Shonbeh and Tasuj District of Dashti County, Bushehr province, Iran. It is administered from the city of Shonbeh.

== Demographics ==
=== Population ===
At the time of the 2006 National Census, the rural district's population was 6,361 in 1,322 households. There were 4,454 inhabitants in 1,088 households at the following census of 2011. The 2016 census measured the population of the rural district as 4,808 in 1,322 households. The most populous of its 19 villages was Baghan, with 1,574 people.

=== Other villages in the rural district ===
- Darvishi
- Kerdelan
- Sena
