= Abdan Rural District =

Rural district in Bushehr province, Iran

Abdan Rural District Persian: دهستان آبدان
- Rural District
- Location within Iran
- Coordinates: 28°05′N 51°45′E
- Country: Iran
- Province: Bushehr
- County: Deyr
- District: Abdan
- Established: 1986
- Capital: Abdan

Population (2016)
  - Total: 954
- Time zone: UTC+3:30 (IRST)

Abdan Rural District (Persian: دهستان آبدان) is in Abdan District of Deyr County, Bushehr province, Iran. It is administered from the city of Abdan.

== Demographics ==
=== Population ===
At the time of the 2006 National Census, the rural district's population (as a part of the Central District) was 1,668 in 295 households. There were 1,698 inhabitants in 377 households at the following census of 2011. The 2016 census measured the population of the rural district as 954 in 247 households, by which time it had been separated from the district in the formation of Abdan District. The most populous of its 21 villages was Konar Torshan, with 230 people.

=== Other villages in the rural district ===
- Chah Qad
- Geshi
