= Abdan District =

District in Bushehr province, Iran

Abdan District Persian: بخش آبدان
- District
- Location within Iran
- Coordinates: 28°05′11″N 51°47′39″E
- Country: Iran
- Province: Bushehr
- County: Deyr
- Established: 2013
- Capital: Abdan

Population (2016)
  - Total: 8,529
- Time zone: UTC+3:30 (IRST)

Abdan District (Persian: بخش آبدان) is in Deyr County, Bushehr province, Iran. Its capital is the city of Abdan.

== History ==
In 2013, Abdan Rural District and the city of Abdan were separated from the Central District in the formation of Abdan District.

== Demographics ==
=== Population ===
At the time of the 2016 census, the district's population was 8,529 people living in 2,278 households.

=== Administrative divisions ===
Abdan District Population
Administrative Divisions	2016
Abdan RD	954
Sar Mastan RD	748
Abdan (city)	6,827
Total	8,529
RD = Rural District
