= Shonbeh and Tasuj District =

District in Bushehr province, Iran

Shonbeh and Tasuj District Persian: بخش شنبه و طسوج
- District
- Location within Iran
- Coordinates: 28°24′N 51°50′E
- Country: Iran
- Province: Bushehr
- County: Dashti
- Established: 2005
- Capital: Shonbeh

Population (2016)
  - Total: 8,621
- Time zone: UTC+3:30 (IRST)

Shonbeh and Tasuj District (Persian: بخش شنبه و طسوج) is in Dashti County, Bushehr province, Iran. Its capital is the city of Shonbeh.

== History ==
The village of Shonbeh was converted to a city in 2009.

== Demographics ==
=== Population ===
At the time of the 2006 census, the district's population was 7,308 in 1,546 households. The following census in 2011 counted 7,903 people in 1,930 households. The 2016 census measured the population of the district as 8,621 inhabitants living in 2,393 households.

Shonbeh and Tasuj District Population
Administrative Divisions	2006	2011	2016
Shonbeh RD (Note: Formerly Shonbeh and Tasuj Rural District)	6,361	4,454	4,808
Tasuj RD	947	921	1,066
Shonbeh (city)		2,528	2,747
Total	7,308	7,903	8,621
RD = Rural District

== History ==
=== 2013 Dashti County earthquake ===
A strong earthquake measuring 6.1 struck the city of Shonbeh and villages of Shonbeh and Tasuj District on 9 April 2013, killing at least thirty-seven people.
