= Tol Siah =

Tol Siah or Tall-e Siah or Tall Siah or Tol-e Siah or Tol Seyah or Tall-e Siyah or Tal-e Siyah (Persian: تل سياه) may refer to:

- Tol Siah, Bushehr
- Tall Siah, Fars
- Tall-e Siah, Hormozgan
- Tall Siah, Kerman
- Tall-e Siah, Kohgiluyeh and Boyer-Ahmad
- Tal-e Siyah, Charam, Kohgiluyeh and Boyer-Ahmad Province
