= Mohammad Shahi =

Village in Bushehr province, Iran

Mohammad Shahi Persian: محمدشاهي
- Village
- Location within Iran
- Coordinates: 29°15′53″N 50°55′58″E
- Country: Iran
- Province: Bushehr
- County: Bushehr
- District: Choghadak
- Rural District: Chah Kutah

Population (2016)
  - Total: 49
- Time zone: UTC+3:30 (IRST)

Mohammad Shahi (Persian: محمدشاهي) (Note: Also romanized as Moḩammad Shāhī; also known as Muhammad Shahi and Angali (انگالي)) is a village in Chah Kutah Rural District of Choghadak District in Bushehr County, Bushehr province, Iran.

== Demographics ==
=== Population ===
At the time of the 2006 National Census, the village's population was 68 in 16 households, when it was in Angali Rural District of the Central District. The following census in 2011 counted 55 people in 13 households. The 2016 census measured the population of the village as 49 people in 11 households.

In 2020, Mohammad Shahi was separated from the district in the formation of Choghadak District and transferred to Chah Kutah Rural District created in the new district.
