= Hoseynaki =

Village in Bushehr province, Iran

Hoseynaki Persian: حسينكي
- Village
- Location within Iran
- Coordinates: 29°06′27″N 51°03′13″E
- Country: Iran
- Province: Bushehr
- County: Bushehr
- District: Choghadak
- Rural District: Chah Kutah

Population (2016)
  - Total: 554
- Time zone: UTC+3:30 (IRST)

Hoseynaki (Persian: حسينكي) (Note: Also romanized as Ḩoseynakī; also known as Husainaki) is a village in Chah Kutah Rural District of Choghadak District in Bushehr County, Bushehr province, Iran.

== Demographics ==
=== Population ===
At the time of the 2006 National Census, the village's population was 504 in 116 households, when it was in Howmeh Rural District of the Central District. The following census in 2011 counted 483 people in 128 households. The 2016 census measured the population of the village as 554 people in 171 households.

In 2020, Hoseynaki was separated from the district in the formation of Choghadak District and transferred to Chah Kutah Rural District created in the new district.
