= Zardaki-ye Olya =

Village in Bushehr province, Iran

Zardaki-ye Olya Persian: زردكي عليا
- Village
- Location within Iran
- Country: Iran
- Province: Bushehr
- County: Bushehr
- District: Choghadak
- Rural District: Chah Kutah

Population (2016)
  - Total: 46
- Time zone: UTC+3:30 (IRST)

Zardaki-ye Olya (Persian: زردكي عليا) (Note: Also romanized as Zardakī-ye ‘Olyā) is a village in Chah Kutah Rural District of Choghadak District in Bushehr County, Bushehr province, Iran.

== Demographics ==
=== Population ===
At the time of the 2006 National Census, the village's population was 78 in 16 households, when it was in Angali Rural District of the Central District. The following census in 2011 counted 51 people in 15 households. The 2016 census measured the population of the village as 46 people in 16 households.

In 2020, Zardaki-ye Olya was separated from the district in the formation of Choghadak District and transferred to Chah Kutah Rural District created in the new district.
