= Qaleh-ye Chah Kutah =

Village in Bushehr province, Iran

Qaleh-ye Chah Kutah Persian: قلعه چاه كوتاه
- Village
- Location within Iran
- Coordinates: 29°03′20″N 51°07′21″E
- Country: Iran
- Province: Bushehr
- County: Bushehr
- District: Choghadak
- Rural District: Chah Kutah

Population (2016)
  - Total: 349
- Time zone: UTC+3:30 (IRST)

Qaleh-ye Chah Kutah (Persian: قلعه چاه كوتاه) (Note: Also romanized as Qal‘eh-ye Chāh Kūtāh; also known as Qal‘eh-ye Aḩmadkhān) is a village in Chah Kutah Rural District of Choghadak District in Bushehr County, Bushehr province, Iran.

== Demographics ==
=== Population ===
At the time of the 2006 National Census, the village's population was 347 in 79 households, when it was in Howmeh Rural District of the Central District. The following census in 2011 counted 362 people in 100 households. The 2016 census measured the population of the village as 349 people in 101 households.

In 2020, Qaleh-ye Chah Kutah was separated from the district in the formation of Choghadak District and transferred to Chah Kutah Rural District created in the new district.
