= Hasan Nezam =

Village in Bushehr province, Iran

Hasan Nezam Persian: حسن نظام
- Village
- Location within Iran
- Coordinates: 29°08′11″N 50°59′03″E
- Country: Iran
- Province: Bushehr
- County: Bushehr
- District: Choghadak
- Rural District: Chah Kutah

Population (2016)
  - Total: Below reporting threshold
- Time zone: UTC+3:30 (IRST)

Hasan Nezam (Persian: حسن نظام) (Note: Also romanized as Ḩasan Neẓām; also known as Ḩasanneẓām) is a village in Chah Kutah Rural District of Choghadak District in Bushehr County, Bushehr province, Iran.

== Demographics ==
=== Population ===
At the time of the 2006 National Census, the village's population was 31 in nine households, when it was in Angali Rural District of the Central District. The following census in 2011 counted 711 people in 201 households. The 2016 census measured the population of the village as below the reporting threshold.

In 2020, Hasan Nezam was separated from the district in the formation of Choghadak District and transferred to Chah Kutah Rural District created in the new district.
