= Chah Kutah =

Village in Bushehr province, Iran

Chah Kutah Persian: چاه كوتاه
- Village
- Location within Iran
- Coordinates: 29°03′14″N 51°08′26″E
- Country: Iran
- Province: Bushehr
- County: Bushehr
- District: Choghadak
- Rural District: Chah Kutah

Population (2016)
  - Total: 2,017
- Time zone: UTC+3:30 (IRST)

Chah Kutah (Persian: چاه كوتاه) (Note: Also romanized as Chāh Kūtāh)) is a village in, and the capital of, Chah Kutah Rural District in Choghadak District of Bushehr County, Bushehr province, Iran.

== Demographics ==
=== Population ===
At the time of the 2006 National Census, the village's population was 1,848 in 455 households, when it was in Howmeh Rural District of the Central District. The following census in 2011 counted 2,136 people in 592 households. The 2016 census measured the population of the village as 2,017 people in 570 households.

In 2020, Chah Kutah was separated from the district in the formation of Choghadak District, and transferred to Chah Kutah Rural District created in the new district.
