= Ahsham-e Hasan =

Village in Bushehr province, Iran

Ahsham-e Hasan Persian: احشام حسن
- Village
- Location within Iran
- Coordinates: 29°14′56″N 50°59′57″E
- Country: Iran
- Province: Bushehr
- County: Bushehr
- District: Choghadak
- Rural District: Chah Kutah

Population (2016)
  - Total: 15
- Time zone: UTC+3:30 (IRST)

Ahsham-e Hasan (Persian: احشام حسن) (Note: Also romanized as Ahsham Hasan and Aḩshām-e Ḩasan; also known as Khasham Ḩasan) is a village in Chah Kutah Rural District of Choghadak District in Bushehr County, Bushehr province, Iran.

== Demographics ==
=== Population ===
At the time of the 2006 National Census, the village's population was 12 in five households, when it was in Angali Rural District of the Central District.. The following census in 2011 counted 13 people in four households. The 2016 census measured the population of the village as 15 people in four households.

In 2020, Ahsham-e Hasan was separated from the district in the formation of Choghadak District and transferred to Chah Kutah Rural District created in the new district.
