= Abtavil =

Village in Bushehr province, Iran

Abtavil Persian: ابطويل
- Village
- Location within Iran
- Coordinates: 29°06′09″N 51°07′18″E
- Country: Iran
- Province: Bushehr
- County: Bushehr
- District: Choghadak
- Rural District: Chah Kutah

Population (2016)
  - Total: 1,507
- Time zone: UTC+3:30 (IRST)

Abtavil (Persian: ابطويل) (Note: Also romanized as Āb Ţavīl and Ābţavīl; also known as Abū Ţavīl) is a village in Chah Kutah Rural District of Choghadak District in Bushehr County, Bushehr province, Iran.

== History ==
In 2020, Abtavil was separated from the district in the formation of Choghadak District and transferred to Chah Kutah Rural District created in the new district.

== Demographics ==
=== Population ===
At the time of the 2006 National Census, the village's population was 1,463 in 329 households, when it was in Howmeh Rural District of the Central District. The following census in 2011 counted 1,546 people in 417 households. The 2016 census measured the population of the village as 1,507 people in 451 households.
