= Ahmadi, Bushehr =

Village in Bushehr province, Iran

Ahmadi Persian: احمدي
- Village
- Location within Iran
- Coordinates: 29°04′34″N 51°03′46″E
- Country: Iran
- Province: Bushehr
- County: Bushehr
- District: Choghadak
- Rural District: Doveyreh

Population (2016)
  - Total: 1,620
- Time zone: UTC+3:30 (IRST)

Ahmadi (Persian: احمدي) (Note: Also romanized as Aḩmadī) is a village in Doveyreh Rural District of Choghadak District in Bushehr County, Bushehr province, Iran.

== Demographics ==
=== Population ===
At the time of the 2006 National Census, the village's population was 1,136 in 247 households, when it was in Howmeh Rural District of the Central District. The following census in 2011 counted 1,422 people in 374 households. The 2016 census measured the population of the village as 1,620 people in 469 households.

In 2020, Ahmadi was separated from the district in the establishment of Choghadak District and transferred to Doveyreh Rural District created in the new district.
