= Heydari, Bushehr =

Village in Bushehr province, Iran

Heydari Persian: حيدري
- Village
- Location within Iran
- Coordinates: 29°16′47″N 50°58′41″E
- Country: Iran
- Province: Bushehr
- County: Bushehr
- District: Choghadak
- Rural District: Chah Kutah

Population (2016)
  - Total: 59
- Time zone: UTC+3:30 (IRST)

Heydari (Persian: حيدري) (Note: Also romanized as Ḩeydarī; also known as Heidari Alkali) is a village in Chah Kutah Rural District of Choghadak District in Bushehr County, Bushehr province, Iran.

== Demographics ==
=== Population ===
At the time of the 2006 National Census, the village's population was 88 in 25 households, when it was in Angali Rural District of the Central District. The following census in 2011 counted 66 people in 22 households. The 2016 census measured the population of the village as 59 people in 22 households.

In 2020, Heydari was separated from the district in the formation of Choghadak District and transferred to Chah Kutah Rural District created in the new district.
