= Sarmal, Iran =

Village in Bushehr province, Iran

Sarmal Persian: سرمل
- Village
- Location within Iran
- Coordinates: 29°06′50″N 51°04′05″E
- Country: Iran
- Province: Bushehr
- County: Bushehr
- District: Choghadak
- Rural District: Chah Kutah

Population (2016)
  - Total: 281
- Time zone: UTC+3:30 (IRST)

Sarmal (Persian: سرمل) (Note: Also known as Samal and Sumail) is a village in Chah Kutah Rural District of Choghadak District in Bushehr County, Bushehr province, Iran.

== Demographics ==
=== Population ===
At the time of the 2006 National Census, the village's population was 268 in 61 households, when it was in Howmeh Rural District of the Central District. The following census in 2011 counted 275 people in 73 households. The 2016 census measured the population of the village as 281 people in 83 households.

In 2020, Sarmal was separated from the district in the formation of Choghadak District and transferred to Chah Kutah Rural District created in the new district.
