= Nowkar-e Mokhi =

Village in Bushehr province, Iran

Nowkar-e Mokhi Persian: نوكارمخي
- Village
- Location within Iran
- Coordinates: 29°11′06″N 51°01′56″E
- Country: Iran
- Province: Bushehr
- County: Bushehr
- District: Choghadak
- Rural District: Chah Kutah

Population (2016)
  - Total: 92
- Time zone: UTC+3:30 (IRST)

Nowkar-e Mokhi (Persian: نوكارمخي) (Note: Also romanized as Nowkār Mokhī and Nowkār-e Mokhī; also known as Naukāl Mukhi, Nowkāl-e Mokhī, Nowkār-e Nakhlī, and Shīf Nowkāl-e Nakhlī) is a village in Chah Kutah Rural District of Choghadak District in Bushehr County, Bushehr province, Iran.

== Demographics ==
=== Population ===
At the time of the 2006 National Census, the village's population was 164 in 33 households, when it was in Angali Rural District of the Central District. The following census in 2011 counted 90 people in 28 households. The 2016 census measured the population of the village as 92 people in 32 households.

In 2020, Nowkar-e Mokhi was separated from the district in the formation of Choghadak District and transferred to Chah Kutah Rural District created in the new district.
