= Jazireh-ye Shif =

Village in Bushehr province, Iran

Jazireh-ye Shif Persian: جزيره شيف
- Village
- Location within Iran
- Coordinates: 29°04′14″N 50°52′38″E
- Country: Iran
- Province: Bushehr
- County: Bushehr
- District: Central
- Rural District: Angali

Population (2016)
  - Total: 3,969
- Time zone: UTC+3:30 (IRST)

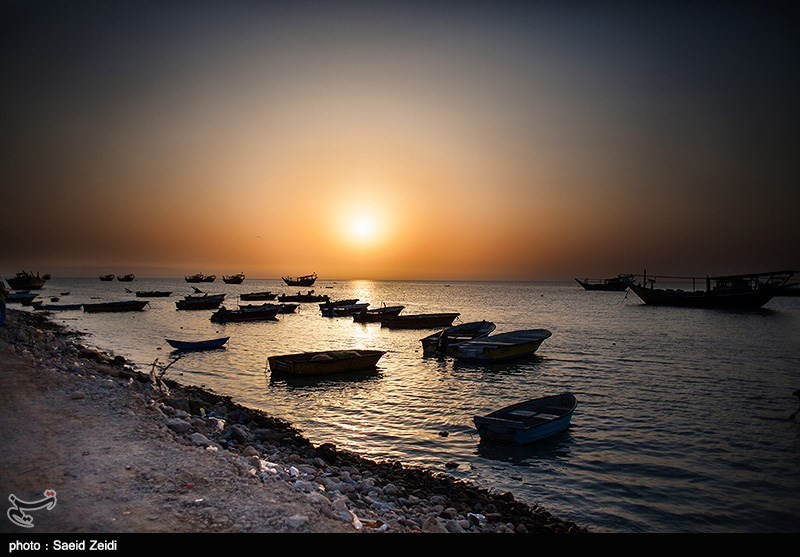

Jazireh-ye Shif (Persian: جزيره شيف) (Note: Also romanized as Jazīreh-ye Shīf; also known as Shaft and Shīf) is a village and island in Angali Rural District of the Central District in Bushehr County, Bushehr province, Iran.

== Demographics ==
=== Population ===
As of 2017, about 85% of its residents were Arabs.

At the time of the 2006 National Census, the village's population was 2,976 in 521 households, when it was in Howmeh Rural District. The following census in 2011 counted 3,363 people in 750 households. The 2016 census measured the population of the village as 3,969 people in 1,060 households.

Jazireh-ye Shif was transferred to Angali Rural District in 2020.
