= Tol-e Ashki =

Village in Bushehr province, Iran

Tol-e Ashki Persian: تل اشكي
- Village
- Location within Iran
- Coordinates: 29°04′27″N 51°07′38″E
- Country: Iran
- Province: Bushehr
- County: Bushehr
- District: Choghadak
- Rural District: Chah Kutah

Population (2016)
  - Total: 739
- Time zone: UTC+3:30 (IRST)

Tol-e Ashki (Persian: تل اشكي) (Note: Also romanized as Tolashkī and Tol-e Ashkī; also known as Tūl Ashki) is a village in Chah Kutah Rural District of Choghadak District in Bushehr County, Bushehr province, Iran.

== Demographics ==
=== Population ===
At the time of the 2006 National Census, the village's population was 717 in 170 households, when it was in Howmeh Rural District of the Central District. The following census in 2011 counted 711 people in 201 households. The 2016 census measured the population of the village as 739 people in 216 households.

In 2020, Tol-e Ashki was separated from the district in the formation of Choghadak District and transferred to Chah Kutah Rural District created in the new district.
