= Chah Kutah Rural District =

Rural district in Bushehr province, Iran

Chah Kutah Rural District Persian: دهستان چاه‌کوتاه
- Rural District
- Location within Iran
- Coordinates: 29°09′N 51°03′E
- Country: Iran
- Province: Bushehr
- County: Bushehr
- District: Choghadak
- Established: 2020
- Capital: Chah Kutah
- Time zone: UTC+3:30 (IRST)

Chah Kutah Rural District (Persian: دهستان چاه‌کوتاه) is in Choghadak District of Bushehr County, Bushehr province, Iran. Its capital is the village of Chah Kutah, whose population at the time of the 2016 National Census was 2,017 people in 570 households.

== History ==
In 2020, the city of Choghadak and parts of Howmeh Rural District were separated from the Central District by the formation of Choghadak District, and Chah Kutah Rural District was created in the new district.

== Administration ==
=== Other villages in the rural district ===
- Abtavil
- Ahsham-e Hasan
- Hasan Nezam
- Heydari
- Hoseynaki
- Mohammad Shahi
- Nowkar-e Gazi
- Nowkar-e Mokhi
- Qaleh-ye Chah Kutah
- Sarmal
- Tol-e Ashki
- Zardaki-ye Olya
