= Doveyreh Rural District =

Rural district in Bushehr province, Iran

Doveyreh Rural District Persian: دهستان دويره
- Rural District
- Location within Iran
- Coordinates: 29°01′N 51°04′E
- Country: Iran
- Province: Bushehr
- County: Bushehr
- District: Choghadak
- Established: 2020
- Capital: Doveyreh
- Time zone: UTC+3:30 (IRST)

Doveyreh Rural District (Persian: دهستان دويره) is in Choghadak District of Bushehr County, Bushehr province, Iran. Its capital is the village of Doveyreh, whose population at the time of the 2016 National Census was 4,096 people in 1,147 households.

== History ==
In 2020, the city of Choghadak and parts of Howmeh and Angali Rural Districts were separated from the Central District in the formation of Choghadak District, and Doveyreh Rural District was created in the new district.

== Administration ==
=== Other villages in the rural district ===
- Ahmadi
- Tol Siah
