= Tol Siah, Bushehr =

Village in Bushehr province, Iran

Tol Siah Persian: تل سياه
- Village
- Location within Iran
- Coordinates: 28°58′39″N 51°06′52″E
- Country: Iran
- Province: Bushehr
- County: Bushehr
- District: Choghadak
- Rural District: Doveyreh

Population (2016)
  - Total: 495
- Time zone: UTC+3:30 (IRST)

Tol Siah (Persian: تل سياه) (Note: Also romanized as Tall-e Sīāh, Tol Seyāh, Tol Sīāh, and Tol-e Sīāh) is a village in Doveyreh Rural District of Choghadak District in Bushehr County, Bushehr province, Iran.

== Demographics ==
=== Population ===
At the time of the 2006 National Census, the village's population was 527 in 133 households, when it was in Howmeh Rural District of the Central District. The following census in 2011 counted 532 people in 152 households. The 2016 census measured the population of the village as 495 people in 163 households.

In 2020, Tol Siah was separated from the district in the formation of Choghadak District and transferred to Doveyreh Rural District created in the new district.
