= Doveyreh =

Village in Bushehr province, Iran

Doveyreh Persian: دويره
- Village
- Location within Iran
- Coordinates: 29°04′25″N 51°04′12″E
- Country: Iran
- Province: Bushehr
- County: Bushehr
- District: Choghadak
- Rural District: Doveyreh

Population (2016)
  - Total: 4,096
- Time zone: UTC+3:30 (IRST)

Doveyreh (Persian: دويره) (Note: Also known as Dowbeyreh) is a village in, and the capital of, Doveyreh Rural District in Choghadak District of Bushehr County, Bushehr province, Iran.

== Demographics ==
=== Population ===
At the time of the 2006 National Census, the village's population was 3,549 in 791 households, when it was in Howmeh Rural District of the Central District. The following census in 2011 counted 4,081 people in 1,054 households. The 2016 census measured the population of the village as 4,096 people in 1,147 households. It was the most populous village in its rural district.

In 2020, Doveyreh was separated from the district in the formation of Choghadak District and transferred to Doveyreh Rural District created in the new district.
