= Nowkar-e Gazi =

Village in Bushehr province, Iran

Nowkar-e Gazi Persian: نوكارگزي
- Village
- Location within Iran
- Coordinates: 29°09′54″N 51°00′32″E
- Country: Iran
- Province: Bushehr
- County: Bushehr
- District: Choghadak
- Rural District: Chah Kutah

Population (2016)
  - Total: 38
- Time zone: UTC+3:30 (IRST)

Nowkar-e Gazi (Persian: نوكارگزي) (Note: Also romanized as Now Kārgazī and Nowkār-e Gazī; also known as Naukāl Gazi, Nowkāl-e Gazī, and Shīf Nowkāl-e Gazī) is a village in Chah Kutah Rural District of Choghadak District in Bushehr County, Bushehr province, Iran.

== Demographics ==
=== Population ===
At the time of the 2006 National Census, the village's population was 102 in 22 households, when it was in Angali Rural District of the Central District. The following census in 2011 counted 45 people in 15 households. The 2016 census measured the population of the village as 38 people in 11 households.

In 2020, Nowkar-e Gazi was separated from the district in the formation of Choghadak District and transferred to Chah Kutah Rural District created in the new district.
