= Askari, Bushehr =

Village in Bushehr province, Iran

Askari Persian: عسكري
- Village
- Location within Iran
- Coordinates: 29°16′29″N 50°50′46″E
- Country: Iran
- Province: Bushehr
- County: Bushehr
- District: Central
- Rural District: Angali

Population (2016)
  - Total: 44
- Time zone: UTC+3:30 (IRST)

Askari (Persian: عسكري) (Note: Also romanized as ‘Askarī; also known as ‘Asgarī and Boneh-e ‘Askarī) is a village in Angali Rural District of the Central District in Bushehr County, Bushehr province, Iran.

== Demographics ==
=== Population ===
At the time of the 2006 National Census, the village's population was 56 in 11 households. The following census in 2011 counted 59 people in 15 households. The 2016 census measured the population of the village as 44 people in 15 households.
