= Rostami, Bushehr =

Village in Bushehr province, Iran

Rostami Persian: رستمي
- Village
- Location within Iran
- Country: Iran
- Province: Bushehr
- County: Bushehr
- District: Central
- Rural District: Angali

Population (2016)
  - Total: 83
- Time zone: UTC+3:30 (IRST)

Rostami (Persian: رستمي) (Note: Also romanized as Rostamī and Rustami) is a village in Angali Rural District of the Central District in Bushehr County, Bushehr province, Iran.

== Demographics ==
=== Population ===
At the time of the 2006 National Census, the village's population was 136 in 29 households. The following census in 2011 counted 104 people in 26 households. The 2016 census measured the population of the village as 83 people in 26 households.
