= Bandargah, Bushehr =

Village in Bushehr province, Iran

Bandargah Persian: بندرگاه
- Village
- Location within Iran
- Coordinates: 28°49′29″N 50°54′27″E
- Country: Iran
- Province: Bushehr
- County: Bushehr
- District: Central
- Rural District: Howmeh

Population (2016)
  - Total: 2,545
- Time zone: UTC+3:30 (IRST)

Bandargah (Persian: بندرگاه) (Note: Also romanized as Bandargāh) is a village in Howmeh Rural District of the Central District in Bushehr County, Bushehr province, Iran.

== Demographics ==
=== Population ===
At the time of the 2006 National Census, the village's population was 2,199 in 523 households. The following census in 2011 counted 2,509 people in 681 households. The 2016 census measured the population of the village as 2,545 people in 735 households.
