= Mohrezi =

Village in Bushehr province, Iran

Mohrezi Persian: محرزي
- Village
- Location within Iran
- Coordinates: 29°16′02″N 50°48′47″E
- Country: Iran
- Province: Bushehr
- County: Bushehr
- District: Central
- Rural District: Angali

Population (2016)
  - Total: 166
- Time zone: UTC+3:30 (IRST)

Mohrezi (Persian: محرزي) (Note: Also romanized as Moḩrezī and Mohrezī; also known as Mowrezī) is a village in Angali Rural District of the Central District in Bushehr County, Bushehr province, Iran.

== Demographics ==
=== Population ===
At the time of the 2006 National Census, the village's population was 165 in 39 households. The following census in 2011 counted 177 people in 41 households. The 2016 census measured the population of the village as 166 people in 54 households.
