= Haft Jush =

Village in Bushehr province, Iran

Haft Jush Persian: هفت جوش
- Village
- Location within Iran
- Coordinates: 29°16′55″N 50°59′32″E
- Country: Iran
- Province: Bushehr
- County: Bushehr
- District: Central
- Rural District: Angali

Population (2016)
  - Total: 16
- Time zone: UTC+3:30 (IRST)

Haft Jush (Persian: هفت جوش) (Note: Also romanized as Haft Joosh and Haft Jūsh) is a village in Angali Rural District of the Central District in Bushehr County, Bushehr province, Iran.

== Demographics ==
=== Population ===
At the time of the 2006 National Census, the village's population was 25 in nine households. The following census in 2011 counted 25 people in 12 households. The 2016 census measured the population of the village as 16 people in eight households.
