= Halileh =

Village in Bushehr province, Iran

Halileh Persian: هليله
- Village
- Location within Iran
- Coordinates: 28°50′05″N 50°52′46″E
- Country: Iran
- Province: Bushehr
- County: Bushehr
- District: Central
- Rural District: Howmeh

Population (2016)
  - Total: 2,268
- Time zone: UTC+3:30 (IRST)

Halileh (Persian: هليله) (Note: Also romanized as Haleyleh, Heleyleh, and Halīleh) is a village in Howmeh Rural District of the Central District in Bushehr County, Bushehr province, Iran.

== Demographics ==
=== Population ===
At the time of the 2006 National Census, the village's population was 1,986 in 468 households. The following census in 2011 counted 2,238 people in 628 households. The 2016 census measured the population of the village as 2,268 people in 664 households.
