= Koreh Band =

Village in Bushehr province, Iran

Koreh Band Persian: كره بند
- Village
- Location within Iran
- Coordinates: 29°16′04″N 50°55′05″E
- Country: Iran
- Province: Bushehr
- County: Bushehr
- District: Central
- Rural District: Angali

Population (2016)
  - Total: 1,203
- Time zone: UTC+3:30 (IRST)

Koreh Band (Persian: كره بند) (Note: Also romanized as Korreh Band; also known as Karaband, Khowreh Band, and Kurreh Band) is a village in, and the capital of, Angali Rural District in the Central District of Bushehr County, Bushehr province, Iran.

== Demographics ==
=== Population ===
At the time of the 2006 National Census, the village's population was 1,277 in 257 households. The following census in 2011 counted 1,250 people in 322 households. The 2016 census measured the population of the village as 1,203 people in 340 households, the most populous in its rural district.
