= Eshki =

Eshki or Ashki (Persian: اشكي) may refer to:

- Tol-e Ashki, a village in Bushehr province
- Eshki, Kermanshah
- Ashki, West Azerbaijan
- Ashki, a colloquial clipping of Ashkenazi
