= Hamud =

Village in Bushehr province, Iran

Hamud Persian: حمود
- Village
- Location within Iran
- Coordinates: 29°15′45″N 50°46′02″E
- Country: Iran
- Province: Bushehr
- County: Bushehr
- District: Central
- Rural District: Angali

Population (2016)
  - Total: 59
- Time zone: UTC+3:30 (IRST)

Hamud (Persian: حمود) (Note: Also romanized as Ḩammūd, Hamood, and Ḩamud) is a village in Angali Rural District of the Central District in Bushehr County, Bushehr province, Iran.

== Demographics ==
=== Population ===
At the time of the 2006 National Census, the village's population was 84 in 14 households. The following census in 2011 counted 70 people in 20 households. The 2016 census measured the population of the village as 59 people in 16 households.
