= Nowkar =

Nowkar (Persian: نوكار), also rendered as Nowkal and Naukal, may refer to:

- Nowkar-e Gazi
- Nowkar-e Mokhi
