= Qaleh-ye Sukhteh, Bushehr =

Village in Bushehr province, Iran

Qaleh-ye Sukhteh Persian: قلعه سوخته
- Village
- Location within Iran
- Coordinates: 29°16′48″N 50°52′19″E
- Country: Iran
- Province: Bushehr
- County: Bushehr
- District: Central
- Rural District: Angali

Population (2016)
  - Total: 274
- Time zone: UTC+3:30 (IRST)

Qaleh-ye Sukhteh (Persian: قلعه سوخته) (Note: Also romanized as Qal‘eh Sūkhteh and Qal‘eh-ye Sukhteh; also known as Qal‘eh-i-Sūkhtan and Sūkhteh) is a village in Angali Rural District of the Central District in Bushehr County, Bushehr province, Iran.

== Demographics ==
=== Population ===
At the time of the 2006 National Census, the village's population was 279 in 56 households. The following census in 2011 counted 265 people in 59 households. The 2016 census measured the population of the village as 274 people in 81 households.
