= Ali Shahr =

City in Bushehr province, Iran

Ali Shahr Persian: عالی شهر
- City
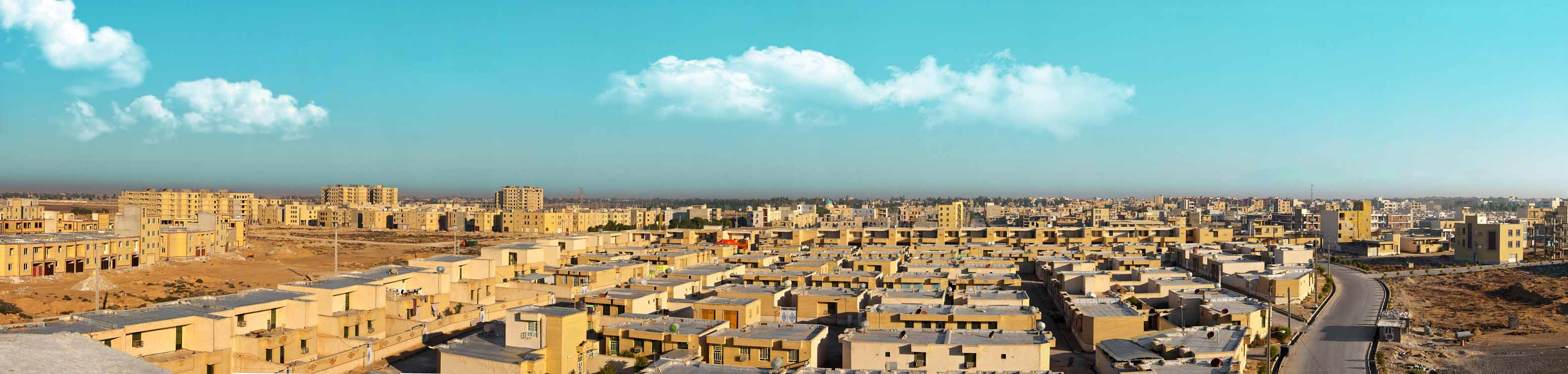
- The city of Ali Shahr

- Location within Iran
- Coordinates: 28°55′37″N 51°03′55″E
- Country: Iran
- Province: Bushehr
- County: Bushehr
- District: Central
- Established as a city: 2015

Population (2016)
  - Total: 23,178
- Time zone: UTC+3:30 (IRST)

Ali Shahr (Persian: عالی شهر) (Note: Also romanized as ʿAlī Shahr and ʿAlīshahr) is a city in the Central District of Bushehr County, Bushehr province, Iran. Ali Shahr is a planned community, 24 km southeast of the city of Bushehr.

== Demographics ==
=== Population ===
At the time of the 2006 National Census, Ali Shahr's population was 6,251 in 1,548 households, when it was a village in Howmeh Rural District. The following census in 2011 counted 12,820 people in 3,511 households. The 2016 census measured the population as 23,178 people in 6,929 households, by which time Ali Shahr had been converted to a city.

== See also ==
Media related to Ali Shahr at Wikimedia Commons
