= Qaleh-ye Sukhteh =

Qaleh-ye Sukhteh or Qaleh Sukhteh (Persian: قلعه سوخته) may refer to:

- Qaleh-ye Sukhteh, Bushehr
- Qaleh Sukhteh, Chaharmahal and Bakhtiari
