= Hammud =

Hammud may refer to:

- Hammud, Iran
- Hammudid dynasty
- Hammud notable family of Sidon, Lebanon
