= PGU =

PGU may refer to:

- First Chief Directorate (Russian: Первое главное управление, Pervoye glavnoye upravleniye), the foreign operations division of the KGB in the Soviet Union
- Peninsula Gas Utilisation, a 1,700-kilometre pipeline in Malaysia
- Perm State University (Russian: Пермский государственный университет, Permskiy gosudarstvennyy universitet), a university in Russia
- Persian Gulf Airport, an airport in ‘Asalūyeh, Iran; IATA code PGU
- Persian Gulf University, a public university in Būshehr, Iran
- Phillips Graduate University, a graduate school in Los Angeles, California
- WPGU, a college radio station at the University of Illinois at Urbana–Champaign, United States
