= Shahrabad, Bushehr =

City in Bushehr province, Iran

Shahrabad Persian: شهرآباد
- City
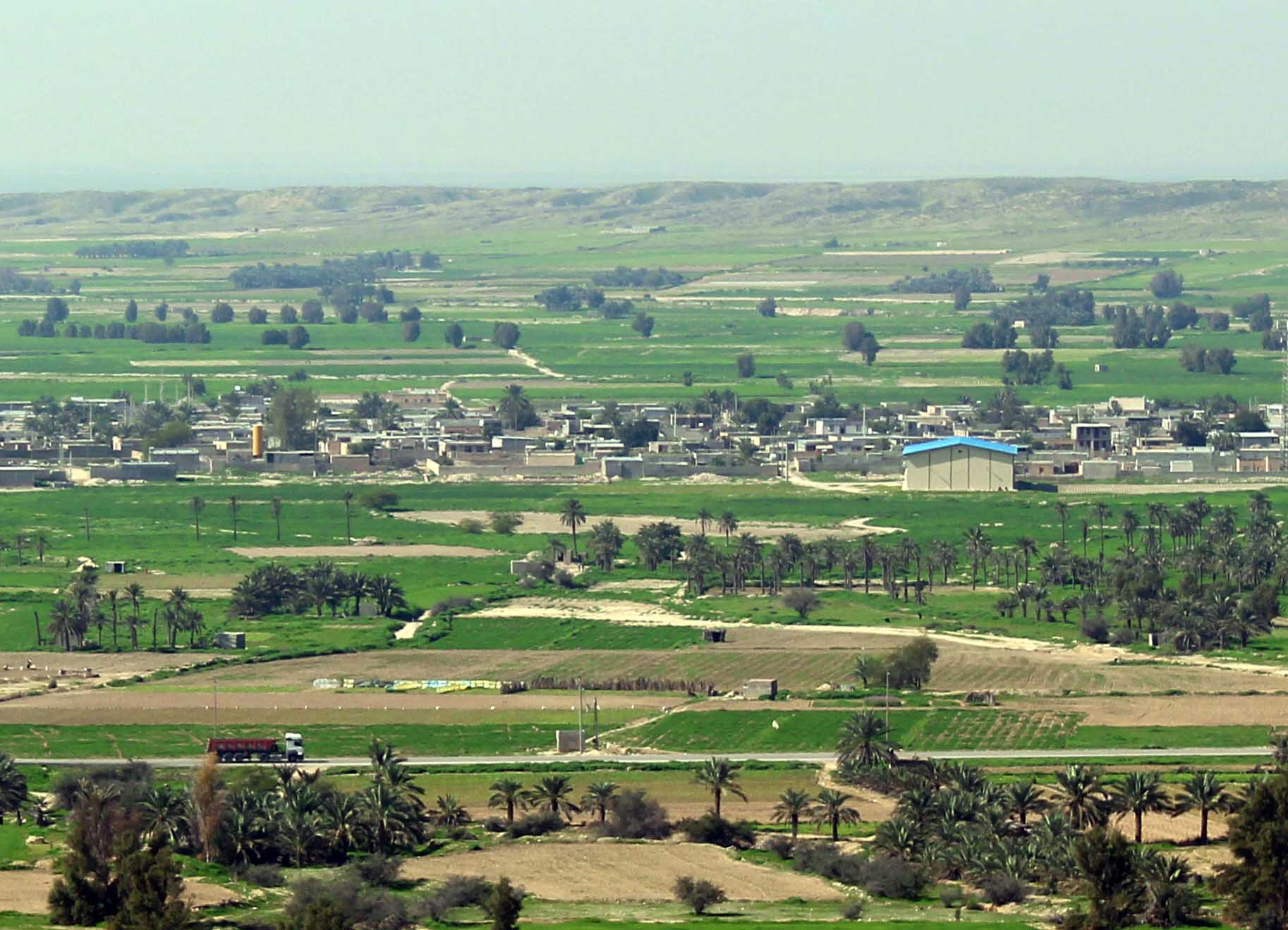

- Location within Iran
- Coordinates: 29°01′29″N 51°15′07″E
- Country: Iran
- Province: Bushehr
- County: Tangestan
- District: Central
- Established as a city: 2012

Population (2016)
  - Total: 3,787
- Time zone: UTC+3:30 (IRST)

Shahrabad (Persian: شهرآباد) (Note: Formerly Abad (آباد), also romanized as Ābād) is a city in the Central District of Tangestan County, Bushehr province, Iran.

== Demographics ==
=== Population ===
At the time of the 2006 National Census, the population was 3,197 in 737 households, when it was the village of Abad in Ahram Rural District. The following census in 2011 counted 3,503 people in 936 households. The 2016 census measured the population of the village as 3,787 people in 1,078 households, by which time the village had been converted to a city as Shahrabad.

== See also ==
Media related to Abad, Bushehr at Wikimedia Commons
