= Iranian South Medical Journal =

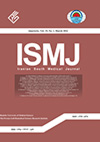
- Discipline: Medical sciences
- Language: Persian (with English abstracts)
- Edited by: Majid Assadi

Publication details
- History: 1997-present
- Publisher: Bushehr University of Medical Sciences (Iran)
- Frequency: Quarterly
- Open access: Yes

Standard abbreviations
- ISO 4: Iran. South Med. J.

Indexing
- ISSN: 1735-4374

Links
- Journal homepage; Online access; Online archive

Iranian South Medical Journal (Persian: فصلنامه طب جنوب) is a peer-reviewed open access quarterly biomedical publication that was established in 1997. The Iranian South Medical Journal publishes original articles, review articles, case reports, book reviews, letters to the editor, responses and short communications. Articles focus on diseases especially in the Persian Gulf and the Gulf of Oman region and analysis of various regional problems. The Iranian South Medical Journal is published by the research deputy of Bushehr University of Medical Sciences, affiliated with the Ministry of Health and Medical Education.

== Abstracting and indexing ==
The Iranian South Medical Journal is indexed and abstracted in Scientific Information Database, Magiran, and Iranmedex.

== See also ==
- Health care in Iran
- Science and technology in Iran
- Teb o Tazkieh
