= Bushehr University of Medical Sciences =

Iranian public medical school

- دانشگاه علوم پزشكي و خدمات بهداشتي درماني بوشهر
- Type: Public
- Established: 1983
- Academic staff: 134
- Students: 1565
- Location: Bushehr, Bushehr, Iran
- Campus: Urban
- Website: www.bpums.ac.ir

Bushehr University of Medical Sciences (BPUMS; Persian: دانشگاه علوم پزشکی بوشهر, Danushgah-e 'lum Pezeshki-ye Bushiher) is a public medical school in Bushehr province, Iran. The university serves as the administering authority for public hospitals in and around the city of Bushehr.

== History ==
Bushehr University of Medical Sciences was founded in 1983 under the name Narjes and started with only 25 students of midwifery. In 1995, after many developments, it changed its name to Bushehr University of Medical Sciences by an official permission from the Ministry of Health and Medical Education. Bushehr University of Medical Sciences trained students in different fields of medical sciences. It offers health service to people of its province. Medicine, Dentistry, Social Medicine, Microbiology, Nursing, Midwifery, Nutrition Science, Environmental Health, Public Health, Library science, operating room technology, Anesthesia and Emergency medical technology are the majors which given by Bushehr University of Medical Sciences.

Bushehr University of Medical Sciences publishes the Iranian South Medical Journal quarterly.

== See also ==
- Healthcare in Iran
- Iranian South Medical Journal
- Higher Education in Iran
- List of hospitals in Iran
