= Teb o Tazkieh =

- Discipline: Medical sciences
- Language: Persian (with English abstracts)
- Edited by: Dr. Shahriar Gharibzadeh

Publication details
- History: 1992-present
- Publisher: Tehran University of Medical Sciences (Iran)
- Frequency: Quarterly
- Open access: Yes

Standard abbreviations
- ISO 4: Teb Tazkieh

Indexing
- ISSN: 1608-2397 (print); 2251-6239 (web)

Links
- Journal homepage; Online archive

Teb o Tazkieh (Persian: طب و تزکیه) is a peer-reviewed open access quarterly medical & cultural publication that was established in 1992. The work "Teb o Tazkieh" in Persian language means "Medicine & Purification". The Teb o Tazkieh has a special part of Continuing Medical Education (CME) in each volume that is strictly interested and followed by readers. The Teb o Tazkieh is published by the deputy of research in Tehran University of Medical Sciences, affiliated with the Ministry of Health and Medical Education.

== Journal's Focuses ==
The Teb o Tazkieh has focuses on 2 goals by publishing the articles:

- Reflect the Ministry of Health and Medical Education’s policy on different issue especially on health care, education, students, culture.
- Reflect cultural ideas of the medical sciences society of Iran.

== Abstracting and indexing ==
The Teb o Tazkieh is indexed and abstracted in Scientific Information Database, Magiran, Iranmedex, Medlib and Irannamaye.

== See also ==
- Health care in Iran
- Iranian South Medical Journal
- Science and technology in Iran
- Tehran University of Medical Sciences
- Ministry of Health and Medical Education
