= Ahram, Iran =

City in Bushehr province, Iran

Ahram Persian: اهرم
- City
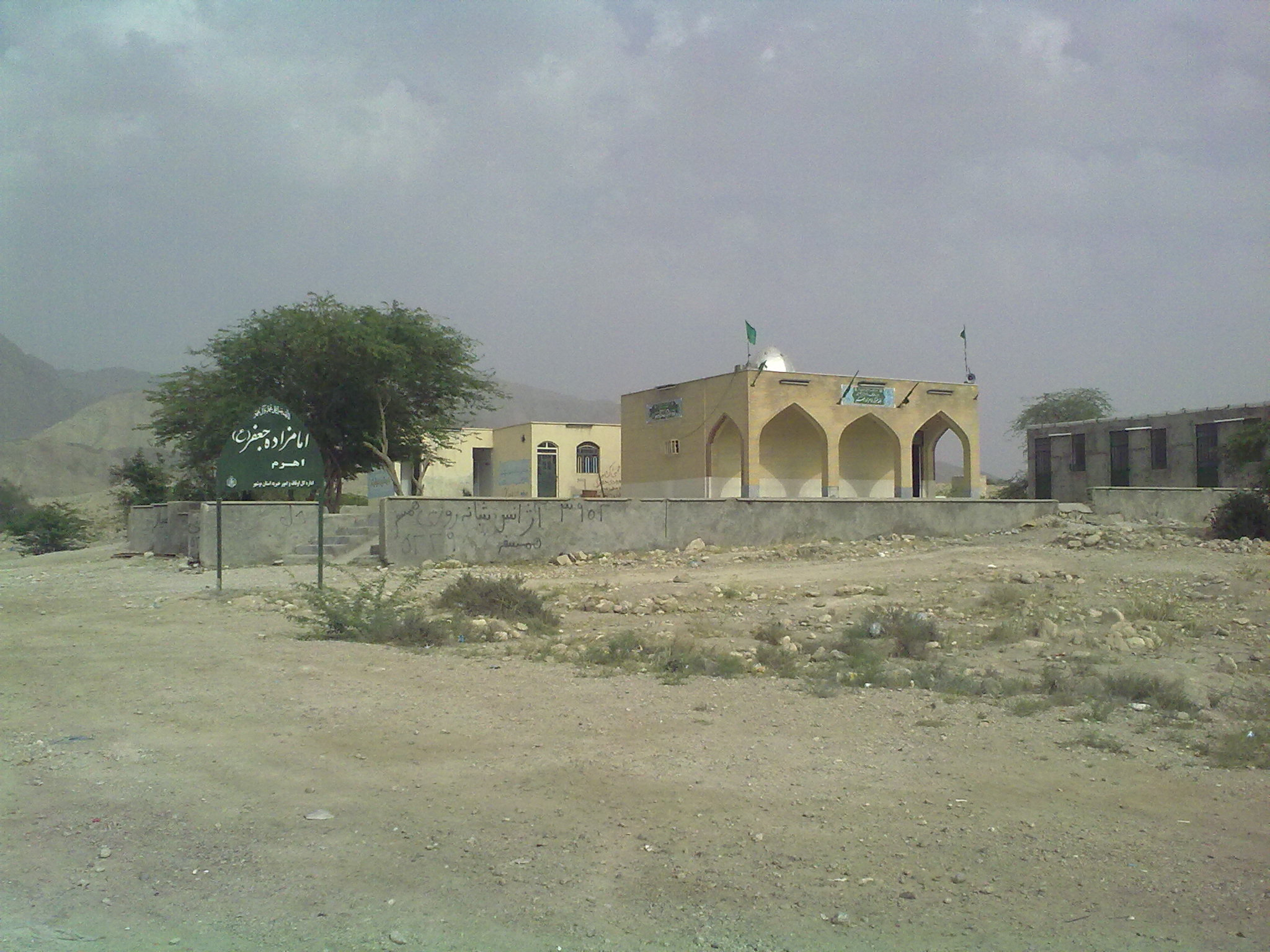
- Emamzadeh-ye Jafar in the city of Ahram

- Location within Iran
- Coordinates: 28°52′58″N 51°16′32″E
- Country: Iran
- Province: Bushehr
- County: Tangestan
- District: Central

Population (2016)
  - Total: 15,198
- Time zone: UTC+3:30 (IRST)

Ahram (Persian: اهرم) (Note: Also romanized as Ahrom) is a city in the Central District of Tangestan County, Bushehr province, Iran, serving as capital of both the county and the district.

== Demographics ==
=== Population ===
At the time of the 2006 National Census, the city's population was 12,182 in 2,710 households. The following census in 2011 counted 13,778 people in 3,433 households. The 2016 census measured the population of the city as 15,198 people in 4,263 households.

== See also ==
Media related to Ahram, Iran at Wikimedia Commons
