= Bord Khun =

City in Bushehr province, Iran

Bord Khun Persian: بردخون
- City
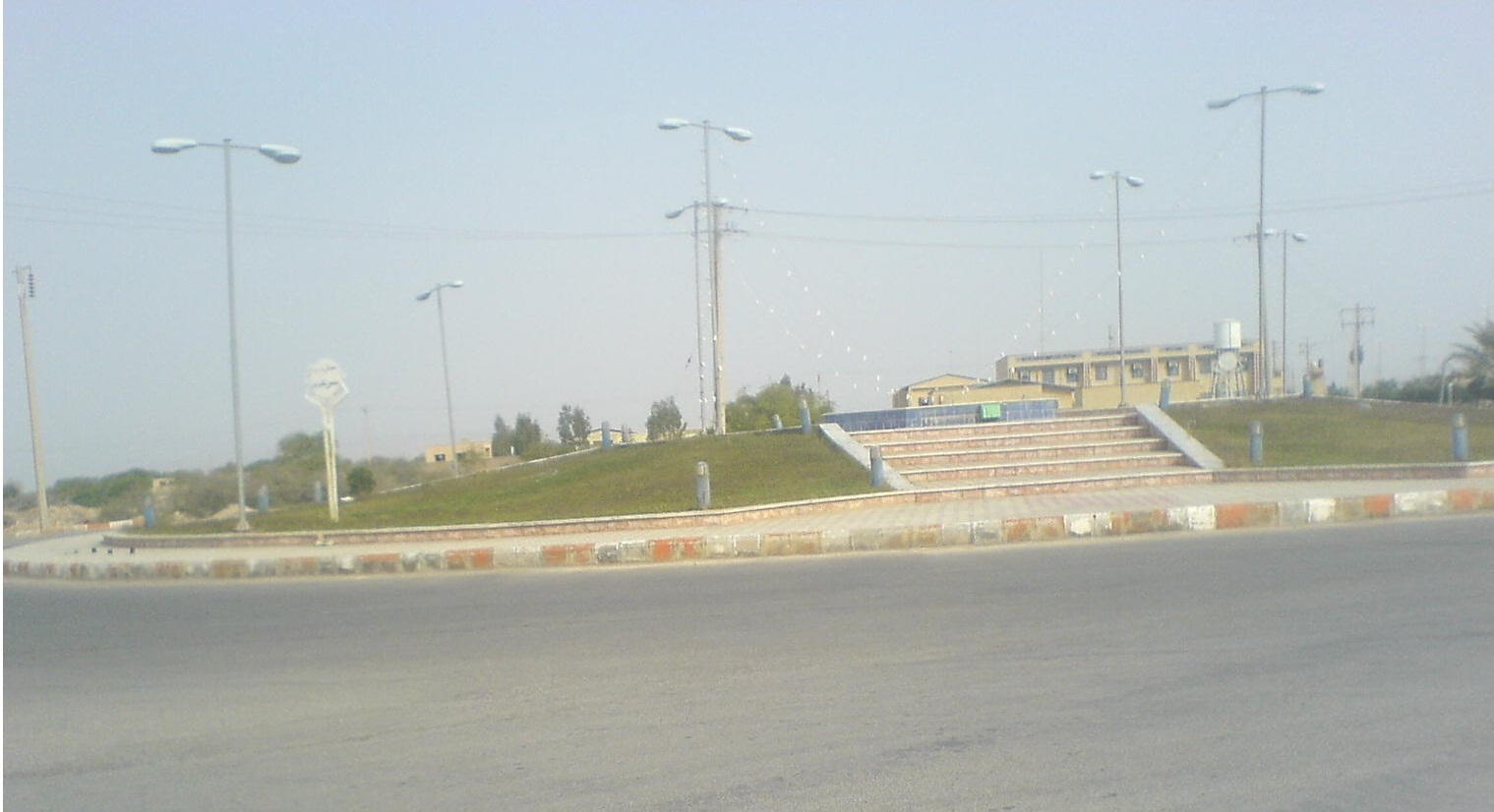
- Street in Bord Khun

- Location within Iran
- Coordinates: 28°03′48″N 51°28′39″E
- Country: Iran
- Province: Bushehr
- County: Deyr
- District: Bord Khun
- Established as a city: 2000

Population (2016)
  - Total: 5,333
- Time zone: UTC+3:30 (IRST)

Bord Khun (Persian: بردخون) (Note: Also romanized as Bord Khūn; formerly known as Bardeh Khān-i-Nau (بردخون نو) and Bord Khūn-e Now (بردخون نو) (New Bord Khun)) is a city in, and the capital of, Bord Khun District in Deyr County, Bushehr province, Iran. It also serves as the administrative center for Bord Khun Rural District. The village of Bord Khun-e Now was converted to a city in 2000.

== Demographics ==
=== Population ===
At the time of the 2006 National Census, the city's population was 4,300 in 931 households. The following census in 2011 counted 4,376 people in 1,114 households. The 2016 census measured the population of the city as 5,333 people in 1,466 households.

== See also ==
Media related to Bord Khun at Wikimedia Commons
