= Bardestan =

City in Bushehr province, Iran

Bardestan Persian: بردستان
- City
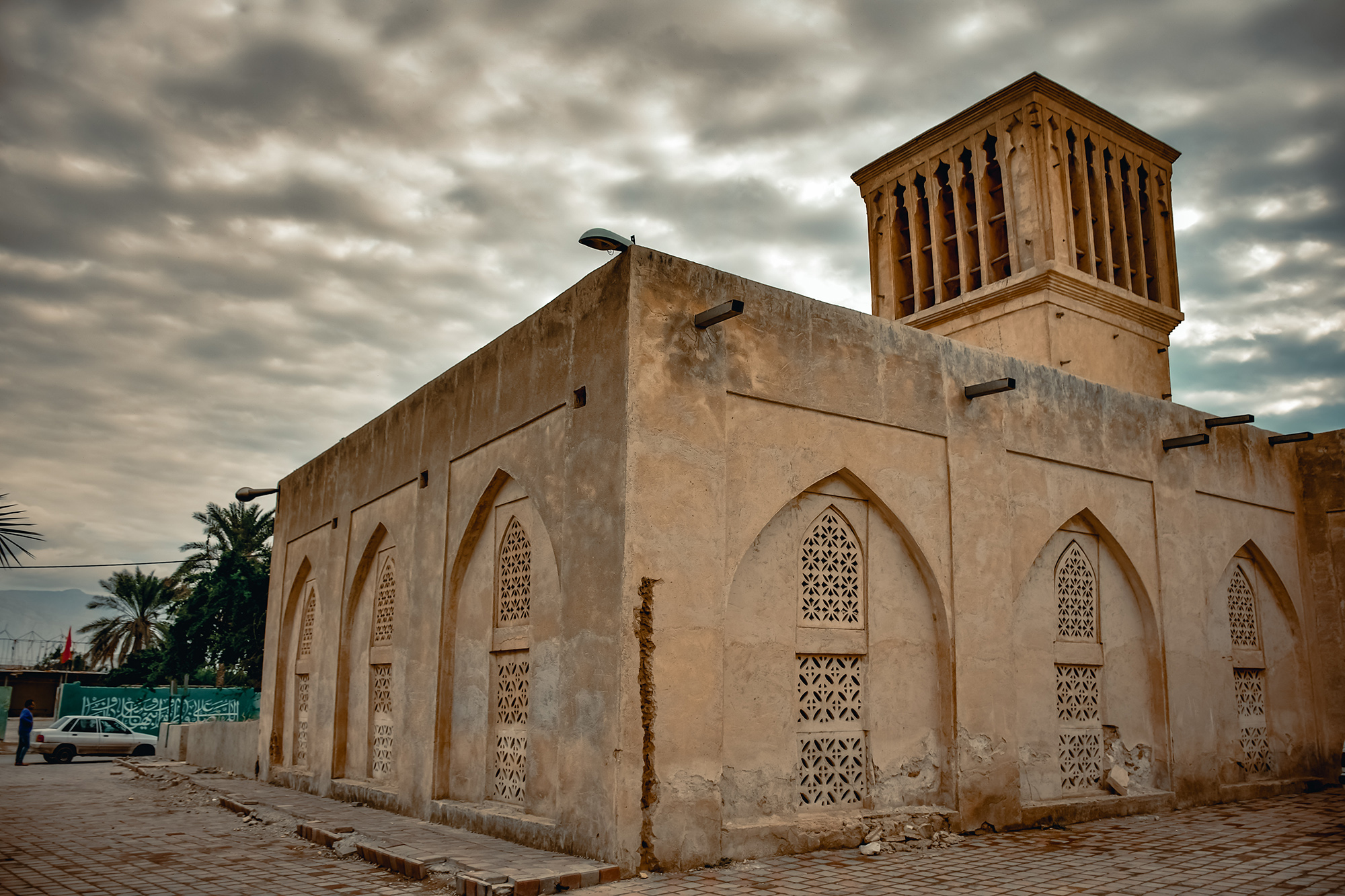
- Mosque in the city of Bardestan

- Location within Iran
- Coordinates: 27°52′25″N 51°57′37″E
- Country: Iran
- Province: Bushehr
- County: Deyr
- District: Central
- Established as a city: 2010

Population (2016)
  - Total: 7,112
- Time zone: UTC+3:30 (IRST)

Bardestan (Persian: بردستان) (Note: Also romanized as Bardestān; also known as Bardbestān and Bardistan) is a city in the Central District of Deyr County, Bushehr province, Iran.

== Demographics ==
=== Population ===
At the time of the 2006 National Census, Bardestan's population was 5,198 in 1,135 households, when it was a village in Howmeh Rural District. The census in 2011 counted 6,078 people in 1,464 households, by which time the village had been elevated to the status of a city. The 2016 census measured the population of the city as 7,112 people in 1,873 households.

== See also ==
Media related to Bardestan at Wikimedia Commons
