= Tall Siah, Kerman =

Tall Siah تل سياه
- Village
- Location within Iran
- Coordinates: 28°09′17″N 57°52′20″E
- Country: Iran
- Province: Kerman
- County: Anbarabad
- Bakhsh: Esmaili
- Rural District: Ganjabad

Population (2006)
  - Total: 39
- Time zone: UTC+3:30 (IRST)
  - Summer (DST): UTC+4:30 (IRDT)

Tall Siah (Persian: تل سياه, also Romanized as Tall Sīāh) is a village in Ganjabad Rural District, Esmaili District, Anbarabad County, Kerman Province, Iran. At the 2006 census, its population was 39, in 8 families.
