= Eshki, Kermanshah =

Eshki اشكي
- Village
- Location within Iran
- Coordinates: 34°59′26″N 45°56′27″E
- Country: Iran
- Province: Kermanshah
- County: Salas-e Babajani
- Bakhsh: Central
- Rural District: Khaneh Shur

Population (2006)
  - Total: 101
- Time zone: UTC+3:30 (IRST)
  - Summer (DST): UTC+4:30 (IRDT)

Eshki (Persian: اشكي, also Romanized as Eshkī; also known as Eshkeh) is a village in Khaneh Shur Rural District, in the Central District of Salas-e Babajani County, Kermanshah Province, Iran. At the 2006 census, its population was 101, in 24 families.
