= Ashki, West Azerbaijan =

Ashki اشكي
- Village
- Location within Iran
- Coordinates: 37°33′31″N 44°44′51″E
- Country: Iran
- Province: West Azerbaijan
- County: Urmia
- Bakhsh: Silvaneh
- Rural District: Targavar

Population (2006)
  - Total: 65
- Time zone: UTC+3:30 (IRST)
  - Summer (DST): UTC+4:30 (IRDT)

Ashki (Persian: اشكي, also Romanized as Āshkī; also known as Āshīk) is a village in Targavar Rural District, Silvaneh District, Urmia County, West Azerbaijan Province, Iran. At the 2006 census, its population was 65, in 11 families.
