= Tall-e Siah, Kohgiluyeh and Boyer-Ahmad =

Tall-e Siah تل سياه
- Village
- Location within Iran
- Coordinates: 30°38′48″N 51°27′45″E
- Country: Iran
- Province: Kohgiluyeh and Boyer-Ahmad
- County: Boyer-Ahmad
- Bakhsh: Central
- Rural District: Dasht-e Rum

Population (2006)
  - Total: 41
- Time zone: UTC+3:30 (IRST)
  - Summer (DST): UTC+4:30 (IRDT)

Tall-e Siah (Persian: تل سياه, also Romanized as Tall-e Sīāh) is a village in Dasht-e Rum Rural District, in the Central District of Boyer-Ahmad County, Kohgiluyeh and Boyer-Ahmad Province, Iran.

== Demographics ==
At the 2006 census, its population was 41, in 10 families.
