= Tall Siah, Fars =

Tall Siah تل سياه
- Village
- Location within Iran
- Coordinates: 30°04′53″N 51°30′39″E
- Country: Iran
- Province: Fars
- County: Mamasani
- Bakhsh: Central
- Rural District: Bakesh-e Yek

Population (2006)
  - Total: 448
- Time zone: UTC+3:30 (IRST)
  - Summer (DST): UTC+4:30 (IRDT)

Tall Siah (Persian: تل سياه, also Romanized as Tall Sīāh) is a village in Bakesh-e Yek Rural District, in the Central District of Mamasani County, Fars province, Iran. At the 2006 census, its population was 448, in 101 families.
