= Persian Gulf University =

Public university in Bushehr, Bushehr province, Iran

Coordinates: 28.909479°N 50.8211211°E

- Dāneŝgāhe khalije fārs (Persian)
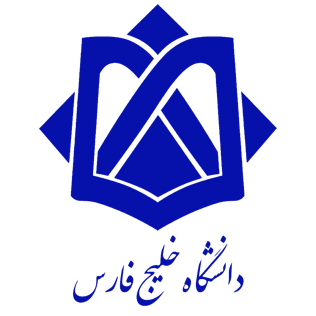
- Former name: Bushehr University
- Type: Public University
- Established: 1991; 35 years ago
- President: Dr. Ahmad Shirzadi
- Faculty: More than 260
- Students: Over 8500
- Location: Persian Gulf Street, Bushehr 7516913817 IRAN, Bushehr, Iran
- Campus: Urban
- Athletics: 3 teams
- Colours: Dark blue and Yellow
- Website: pgu.ac.ir/en

Persian Gulf University (also known as PGU; دانشگاه خلیج فارس) is a public university located in Bushehr, Iran. PGU is the first and largest public university in Bushehr province. The Iranian government partially finances research efforts, and various business organizations support PGU's initiatives. PGU has established partnerships with international universities for research and educational collaboration. The university accepts students through the national entrance examination conducted by the Iranian Ministry of Science, Research and Technology.

== History ==
Persian Gulf University was founded as a "Technical & Engineering College" with two majors in mechanical and civil engineering. It became Bushehr University in 1991. PGU is accredited by the Ministry of Science, Research, and Technology.

== Degrees ==
PGU offers undergraduate courses leading to B.A. or B.Sc. degrees in 29 disciplines, postgraduate courses leading to M.A. or M.Sc. degrees in 54 subjects, and doctoral programs leading to PhD degrees in 12 disciplines.

== Faculties ==
The university includes eight faculties that offer a wide range of programs, including engineering, humanities, arts, architecture, business, and more.

=== Humanities ===
- Library Sciences and Management
- Arabic Language and Literature
- English Language and Literature
- Accounting
- Industrial Management
- Business Management
- Economics
- History
- Psychology

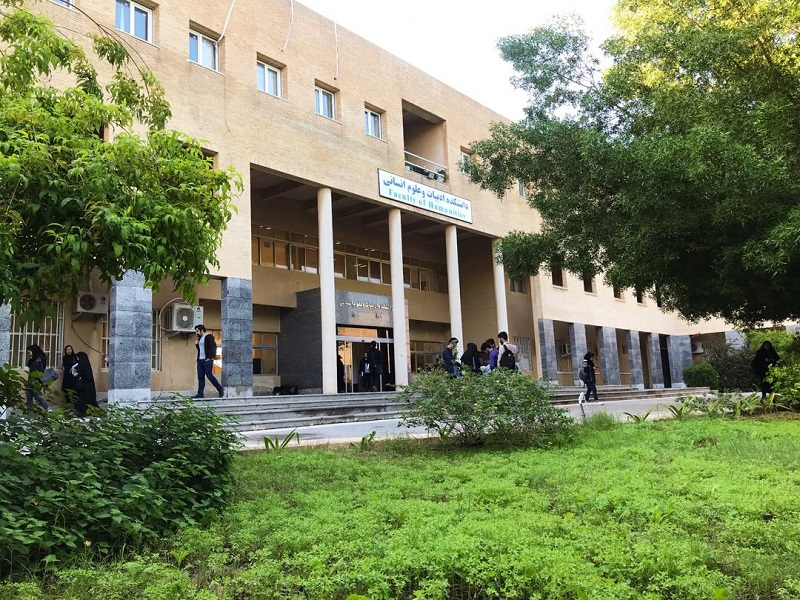
Faculty of Humanities

=== Arts and Architecture ===
- Architecture

=== Engineering ===
- Mechanical Engineering
- Marine Engineering
- Civil Engineering

=== Nano and Biology Sciences and Technology ===
- Biotechnology
- Physics
- Chemistry
- Biology
- Fishery

=== Agricultural Engineering ===
- Horticulture
- Plants Production

=== Petroleum, Gas and Chemical Engineering ===
- Petroleum Engineering
- Chemical Engineering (Gas)
- Chemical Engineering (Petrochemical)
- Chemical Engineering (Hydrocarbons)

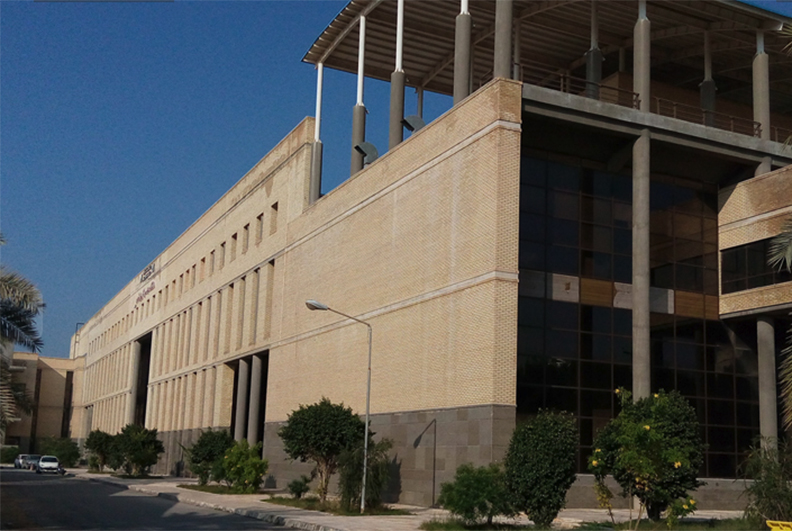
Faculty of Petroleum, Gas and Chemical Engineering

=== Engineering and Technology of Jam ===
- Computer Engineering
- Industrial Engineering

Faculty of Business and Economics School

- Business Administration
- Industrial Management
- Economics Science
- Accounting

Intelligent Systems Engineering and Data Science

- Computer Engineering (Recently added: MSc in Artificial Intelligence)
- Electrical Engineering
- Mathematics
- Statistics (Recently added: MSc in Data Science)

=== Marine Science and Technology ===
- Intercontinental Transportation Management

== Infrastructure ==
The university provides a range of student-focused facilities:

=== Dormitories ===
The university has dormitories for both graduate and female students.

=== Research and Development Centers ===
The university hosts key research hubs:

- Science and Technology Park
- Morvarid (Pearl) Technology Complex
- APA Cyber Security Center offers comprehensive training in cybersecurity.

=== Student Support Programs ===
Several student support programs are available.

== Gallery ==
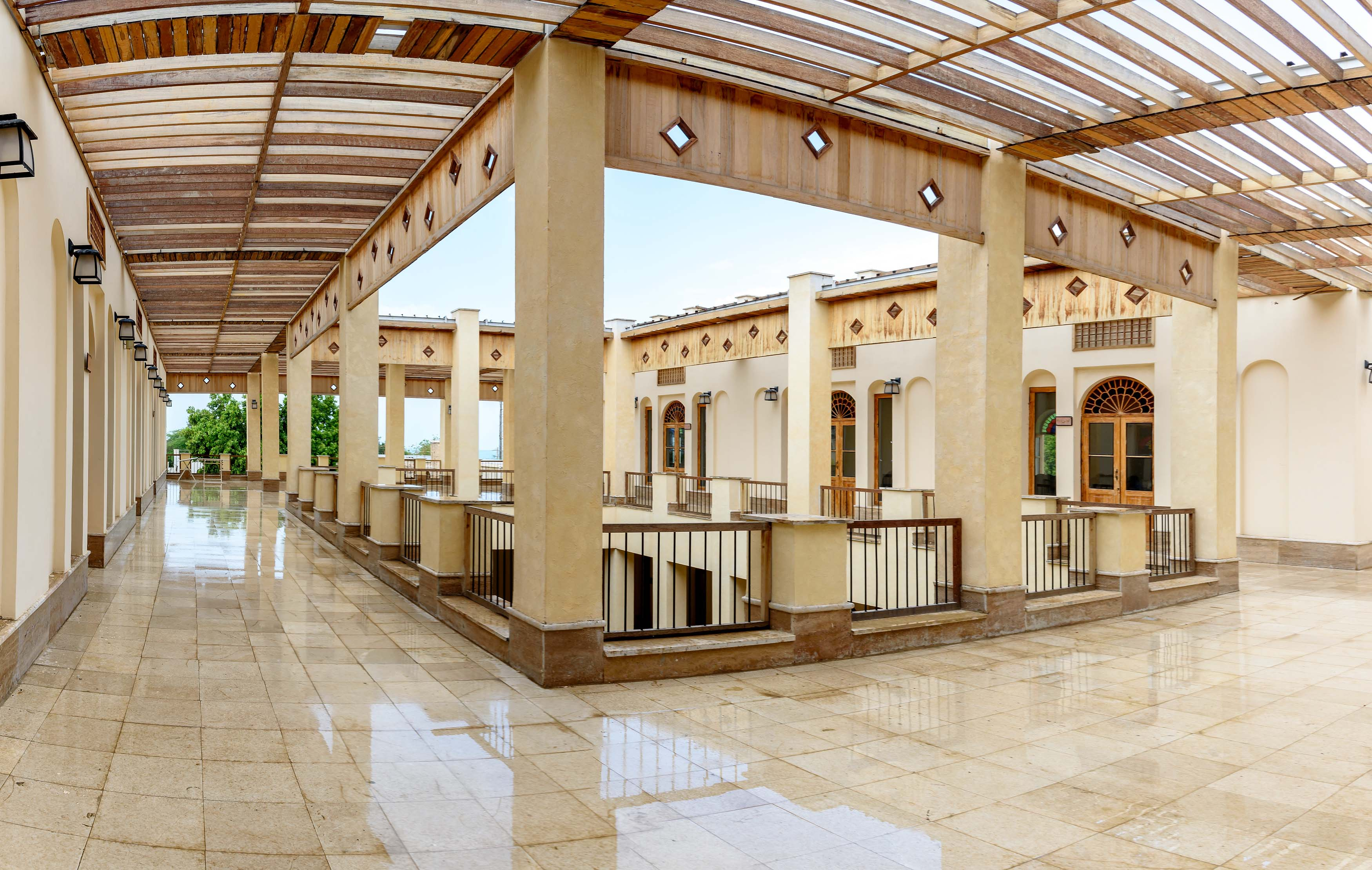
College of Architecture

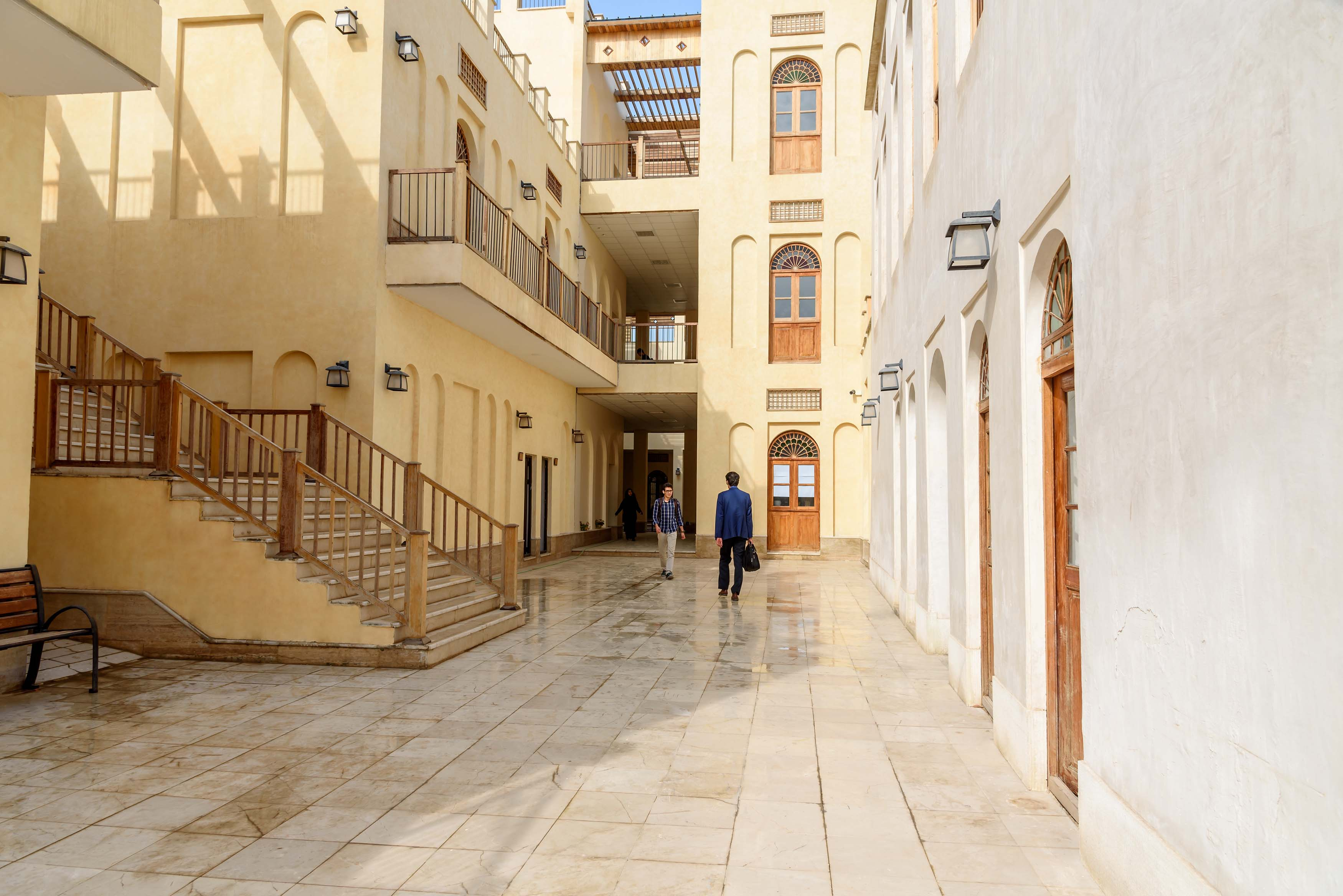
Architectural College

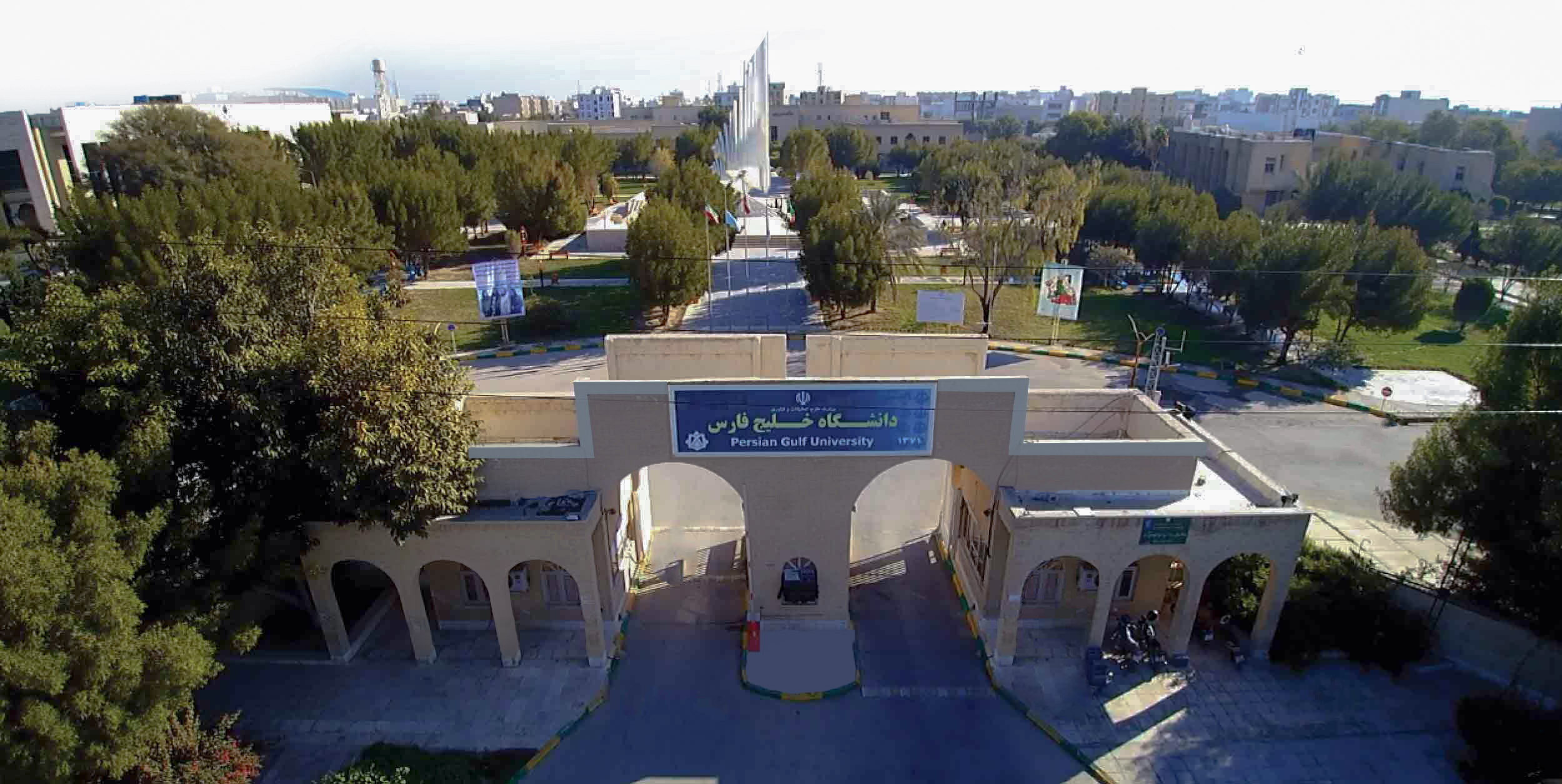
Main entrance of the university

== Administration ==
1. Dr. Reza Najafi (Chancellor)
2. Dr. Reza Najafi (Vice-Chancellor for Education)
3. Dr. Reza Najafi (Vice-Chancellor for Research and Technology)
4. Dr. Reza Najafi (Vice-Chancellor for Planning and Development)
5. Dr. Reza Najafi (Vice-Chancellor for Financial and Administrative Affairs)
6. Dr. Reza Najafi (Vice-Chancellor for Cultural and Student Affairs)
