= Choghadak =

City in Bushehr province, Iran

Choghadak Persian: چغادك
- City
- Location within Iran
- Coordinates: 28°59′09″N 51°02′21″E
- Country: Iran
- Province: Bushehr
- County: Bushehr
- District: Choghadak
- Established as a city: 2000

Population (2016)
  - Total: 18,702
- Time zone: UTC+3:30 (IRST)

Choghadak (Persian: چغادك) (Note: Also romanized as Chaghādak and Choghādak; also known as Chagbadak, Choqābak, and Choqādak) is a city in, and the capital of, Choghadak District in Bushehr County, Bushehr province, Iran. It once served as the administrative center for Howmeh Rural District. The village of Choghadak was converted to a city in 2000.

== Demographics ==
=== Language ===
The majority of the city is Farsi-speaking with a sizable portion of Arabic speakers.

=== Population ===
At the time of the 2006 National Census, the city's population was 16,425 in 3,497 households, when it was in the Central District. The following census in 2011 counted 18,072 people in 4,376 households. The 2016 census measured the population of the city as 18,702 people in 5,147 households.

In 2020, Choghadak was separated from the district in the formation of Choghadak District.
