= Angali Rural District =

Rural district in Bushehr province, Iran

Angali Rural District Persian: دهستان انگالي
- Rural District
- Location within Iran
- Coordinates: 29°11′N 50°48′E
- Country: Iran
- Province: Bushehr
- County: Bushehr
- District: Central
- Established: 1986
- Capital: Koreh Band

Population (2016)
  - Total: 2,209
- Time zone: UTC+3:30 (IRST)

Angali Rural District (Persian: دهستان انگالي) is in the Central District of Bushehr County, Bushehr province, Iran. Its capital is the village of Koreh Band.

== Demographics ==
=== Religion ===
The Angali people are Shi’ite Muslims, believing in the Twelve Imams. They are faithful believers, and, except for children and some of the youth before the legal age of eighteen, they all observe their religious rituals: three times of prayers during the day, annual fasting, etc.

=== Population ===
At the time of the 2006 National Census, the rural district's population was 2,636 in 557 households. There were 2,301 inhabitants in 601 households at the following census of 2011. The 2016 census measured the population of the rural district as 2,209 in 653 households. The most populous of its 25 villages was Koreh Band, with 1,203 people.

=== Other villages in the rural district ===
- Askari
- Haft Jush
- Hamud
- Jazireh-ye Shif
- Mohrezi
- Qaleh-ye Sukhteh
- Rostami

== Overview ==
The district is located near the coast of the Persian Gulf, some 55 kilometers to the north of the city of Bushehr, the capital city of Bushehr province, in the southwest of Iran. It is enclosed between the Rūhelle (local for Rud Haleh, Haleh River) and the Shabankareh District on the north, Rudhaleh Rural District on the west, the Bushehr harbor on the south, and Dashtestan County to the east.

At one time it was under the jurisdiction of the governor of the Persian Gulf Ports. In conjunction with Bushehr, this province was later developed into the province of Bushehr and Banader (Bushehr and the Ports). Angali was formerly a part of Dashtestan County and later was separated from it for administrative purposes.

Although historically Angali has always been one of the important and strategic centers of political activity (partly due to the conflict between the local khāns (chieftains’) and the central government, over matters such as independence and firearms control, etc.), Angali was never registered on maps of Iran. Even in the most current maps only occasionally it is included.

One of the main reasons is rooted in the strategy of the Pahlavi regime (under Reza Shah, as well as his son and successor Mohammad-Reza, a.k.a. the Shah) who kept the regional powers (that is, the khāns, kalāntars, and their tribes and tribesmen) in low profile, in order to prevent any possible encouragement for others, who might follow their foot steps in dealing with the central government. In fact, Lorimer attests that, "the men of Angāli are described as brave and hard working." It is not infrequent in the history of Iran that the central governments fear these "brave and hard working" local men.
