= Howmeh Rural District (Bushehr County) =

Rural district in Bushehr province, Iran

Howmeh Rural District Persian: دهستان حومه
- Rural District
- Location within Iran
- Coordinates: 28°58′N 50°58′E
- Country: Iran
- Province: Bushehr
- County: Bushehr
- District: Central
- Established: 1986

Population (2016)
  - Total: 22,766
- Time zone: UTC+3:30 (IRST)

Howmeh Rural District (Persian: دهستان حومه) is in the Central District of Bushehr County, Bushehr province, Iran. It was previously administered from the city of Choghadak. (Note: Transferred to Choghadak District in 2020)

== Demographics ==
=== Population ===
At the time of the 2006 National Census, the rural district's population was 27,156 in 6,385 households. There were 35,525 inhabitants in 9,607 households at the following census of 2011. The 2016 census measured the population of the rural district as 22,766 in 6,628 households. The most populous of its 16 villages was Doveyreh, (Note: Transferred to Doveyreh Rural District of Choghadak District in 2020) with 4,096 people.

=== Other villages in the rural district ===
- Bandargah
- Bushehr Nuclear Power Plant
- Halileh

In 2020, parts of the rural district were separated from the district in the formation of Choghadak District.
