= Choghadak District =

District in Bushehr province, Iran

Choghadak District Persian: بخش چغادك
- District
- Location within Iran
- Coordinates: 29°08′N 51°03′E
- Country: Iran
- Province: Bushehr
- County: Bushehr
- Established: 2020
- Capital: Choghadak
- Time zone: UTC+3:30 (IRST)

Choghadak District (Persian: بخش چغادك) is in Bushehr County, Bushehr province, Iran. Its capital is the city of Choghadak, whose population at the time of the 2016 National Census was 18,702 people in 4,376 households.

== History ==
In 2020, Choghadak and parts of Howmeh and Angali Rural Districts were separated from the Central District in the formation of Choghadak District.

== Demographics ==
=== Administrative divisions ===
Choghadak District (Bushehr County)
Administrative Divisions
Chah Kutah RD
Doveyreh RD
Choghadak (city)
RD = Rural District
