= Bushehr County =

County in Bushehr province, Iran

Bushehr County Persian: شهرستان بوشهر
- County
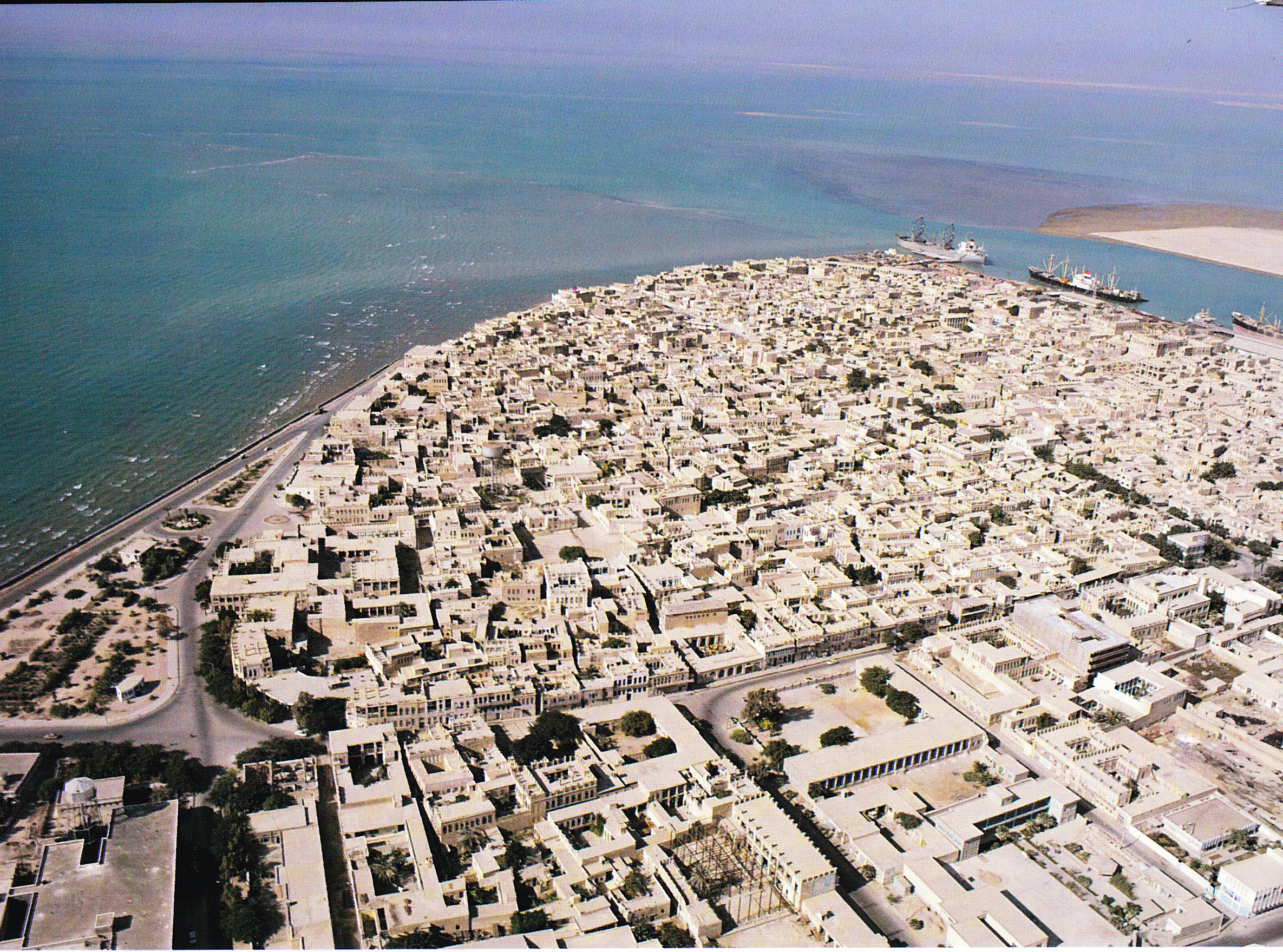
- The city of Bushehr in 1973

- Location of Bushehr County in Bushehr province (left, purple)

- Location of Bushehr province in Iran
- Coordinates: 29°01′N 50°58′E
- Country: Iran
- Province: Bushehr
- Capital: Bushehr
- Districts: Central, Choghadak, Kharg

Area
  - Total: 1,386 km^{2} (535 sq mi)

Population (2016)
  - Total: 298,594
  - Density: 215.4/km^{2} (558.0/sq mi)
- Time zone: UTC+3:30 (IRST)

Bushehr County (Persian: شهرستان بوشهر) is in Bushehr province, Iran. Its capital is the city of Bushehr.

== History ==
The village of Ali Shahr was converted to a city in 2015. In 2020, the city of Choghadak and parts of Howmeh and Angali Rural Districts were separated from the Central District in the formation of Choghadak District, which was divided into the new Chah Kutah and Doveyreh Rural Districts.

== Demographics ==
=== Population ===
At the time of the 2006 National Census, the county's population was 216,087 in 53,173 households. The following census in 2011 counted 258,906 people in 68,819 households. The 2016 census measured the population of the county as 298,594 in 85,523 households.

=== Administrative divisions ===
Bushehr County's population history and administrative structure over three consecutive censuses are shown in the following table.

Bushehr County Population
Administrative Divisions	2006	2011	2016
Central District	207,891	251,120	290,359
Angali RD	2,636	2,301	2,209
Howmeh RD	27,156	35,525	22,766
Ali Shahr (city)			23,178
Bushehr (city)	161,674	195,222	223,504
Choghadak (city)	16,425	18,072	18,702
Choghadak District (Note: Established in 2020)			
Chah Kutah RD			
Doveyreh RD			
Choghadak (city)			
Kharg District	8,196	7,722	8,193
Kharg (city)	8,196	7,722	8,193
Total	216,087	258,906	298,594
RD = Rural District

== See also ==
Media related to Bushehr County at Wikimedia Commons
