= Central District (Bushehr County) =

District in Bushehr province, Iran

Central District (Bushehr County) Persian: بخش مرکزی شهرستان بوشهر
- District
- Location within Iran
- Coordinates: 29°04′N 50°56′E
- Country: Iran
- Province: Bushehr
- County: Bushehr
- Capital: Bushehr

Population (2016)
  - Total: 290,359
- Time zone: UTC+3:30 (IRST)

The Central District of Bushehr County (Persian: بخش مرکزی شهرستان بوشهر) is in Bushehr province, Iran. Its capital is the city of Bushehr.

== History ==
The village of Ali Shahr was converted to a city in 2015. In 2020, the city of Choghadak and parts of Howmeh Rural District were separated from the district in the formation of Choghadak District.

== Demographics ==
=== Population ===
At the time of the 2006 National Census, the district's population was 207,891 in 51,210 households. The following census in 2011 counted 251,120 people in 66,788 households. The 2016 census measured the population of the district as 290,359 inhabitants living in 83,177 households.

=== Administrative divisions ===
Central District (Bushehr County) Population
Administrative Divisions	2006	2011	2016
Angali RD	2,636	2,301	2,209
Howmeh RD	27,156	35,525	22,766
Ali Shahr (city)			23,178
Bushehr (city)	161,674	195,222	223,504
Choghadak (city) (Note: Transferred to Choghadak District after the 2016 census)	16,425	18,072	18,702
Total	207,891	251,120	290,359
RD = Rural District
