= Bushehr province =

Province of Iran

Bushehr province استان بوشهر (Persian)
- Province
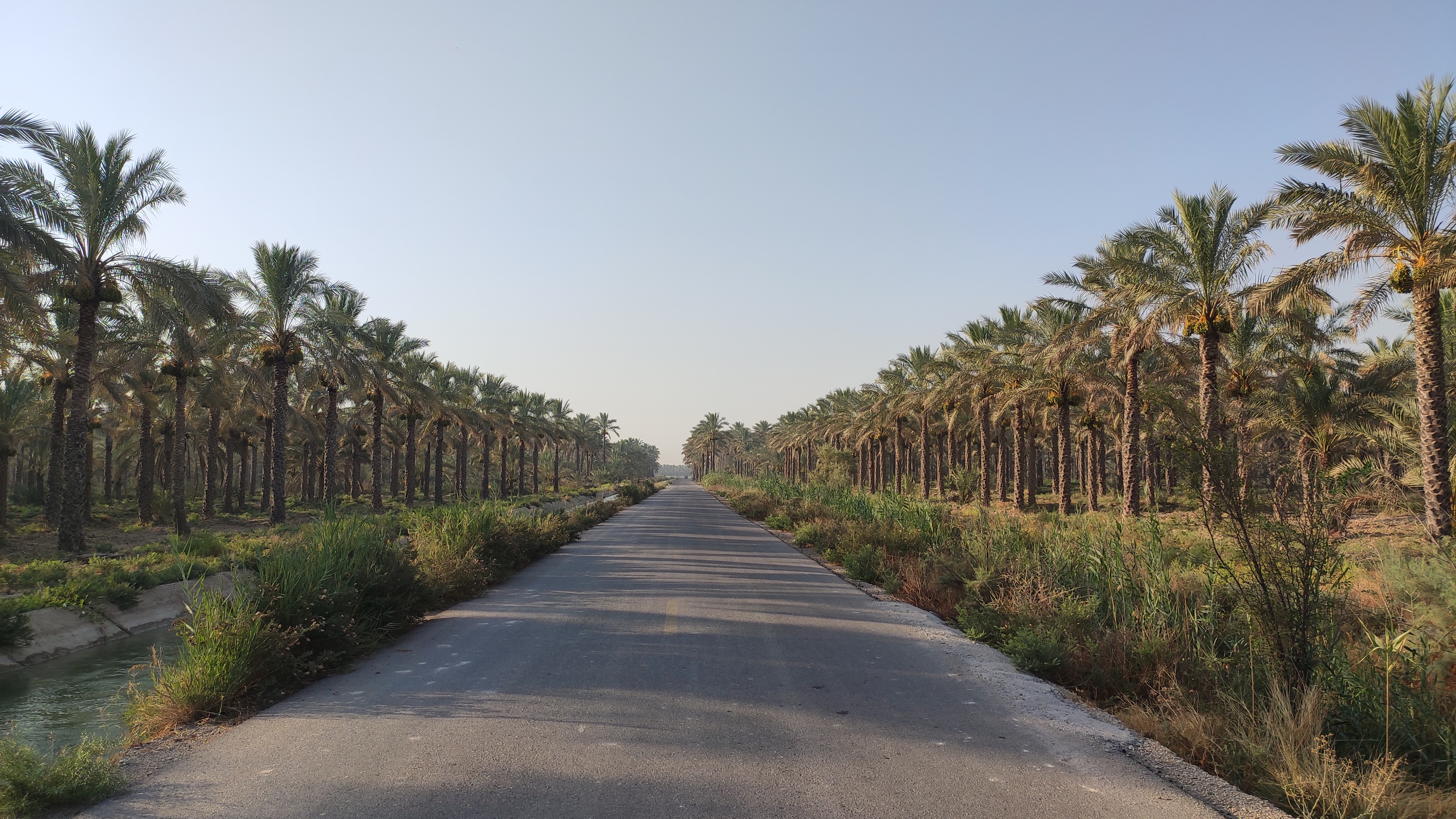
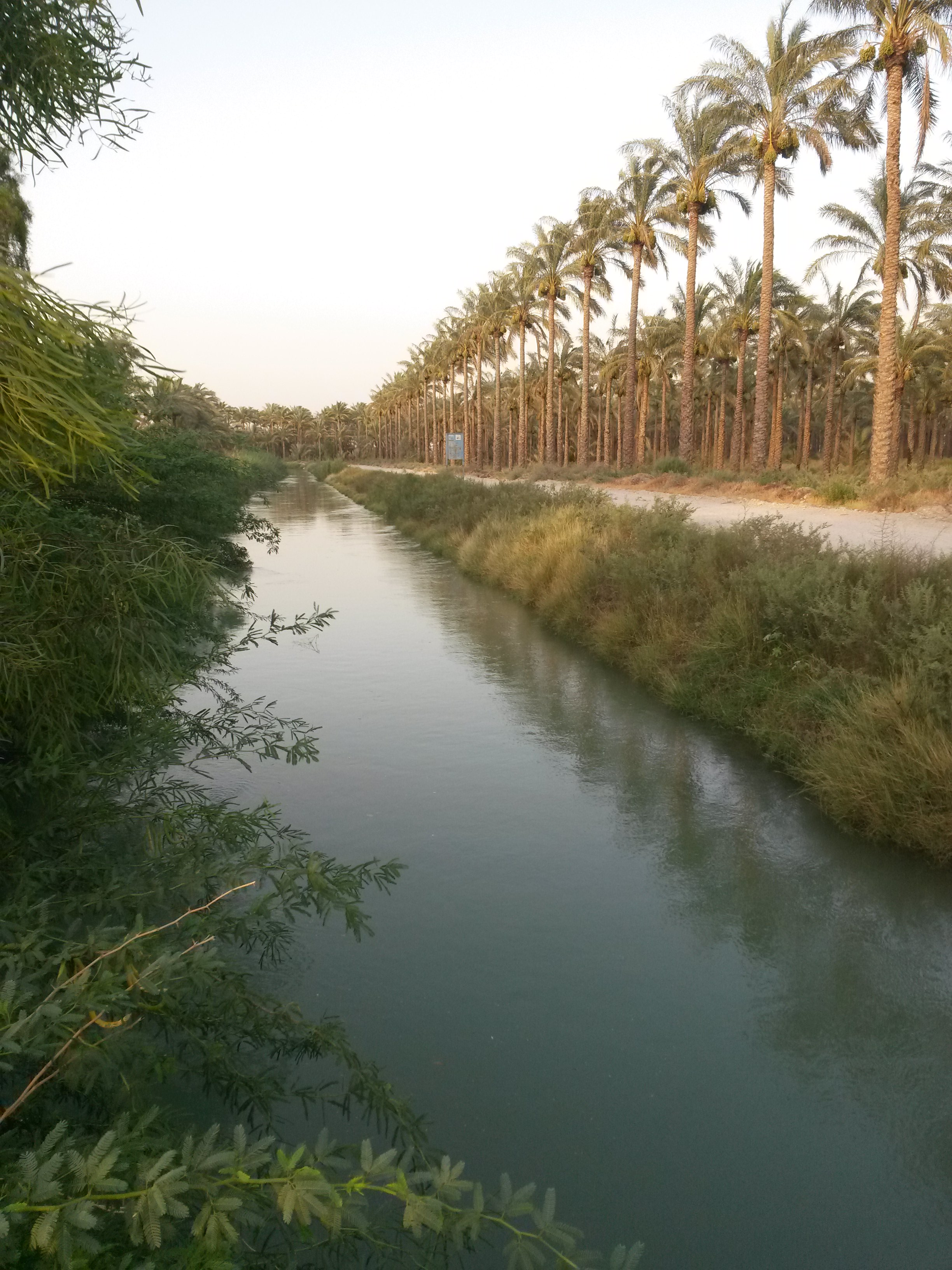
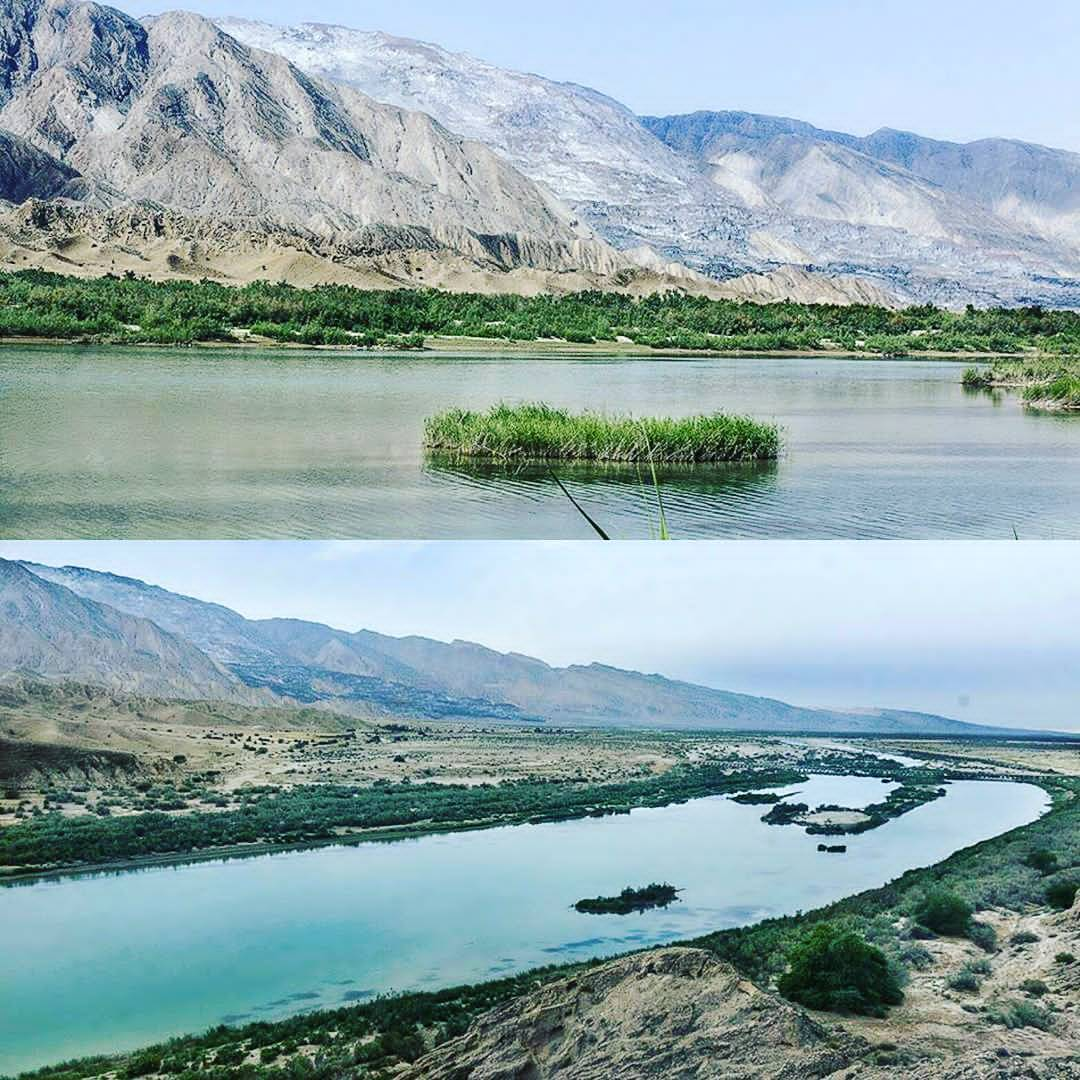
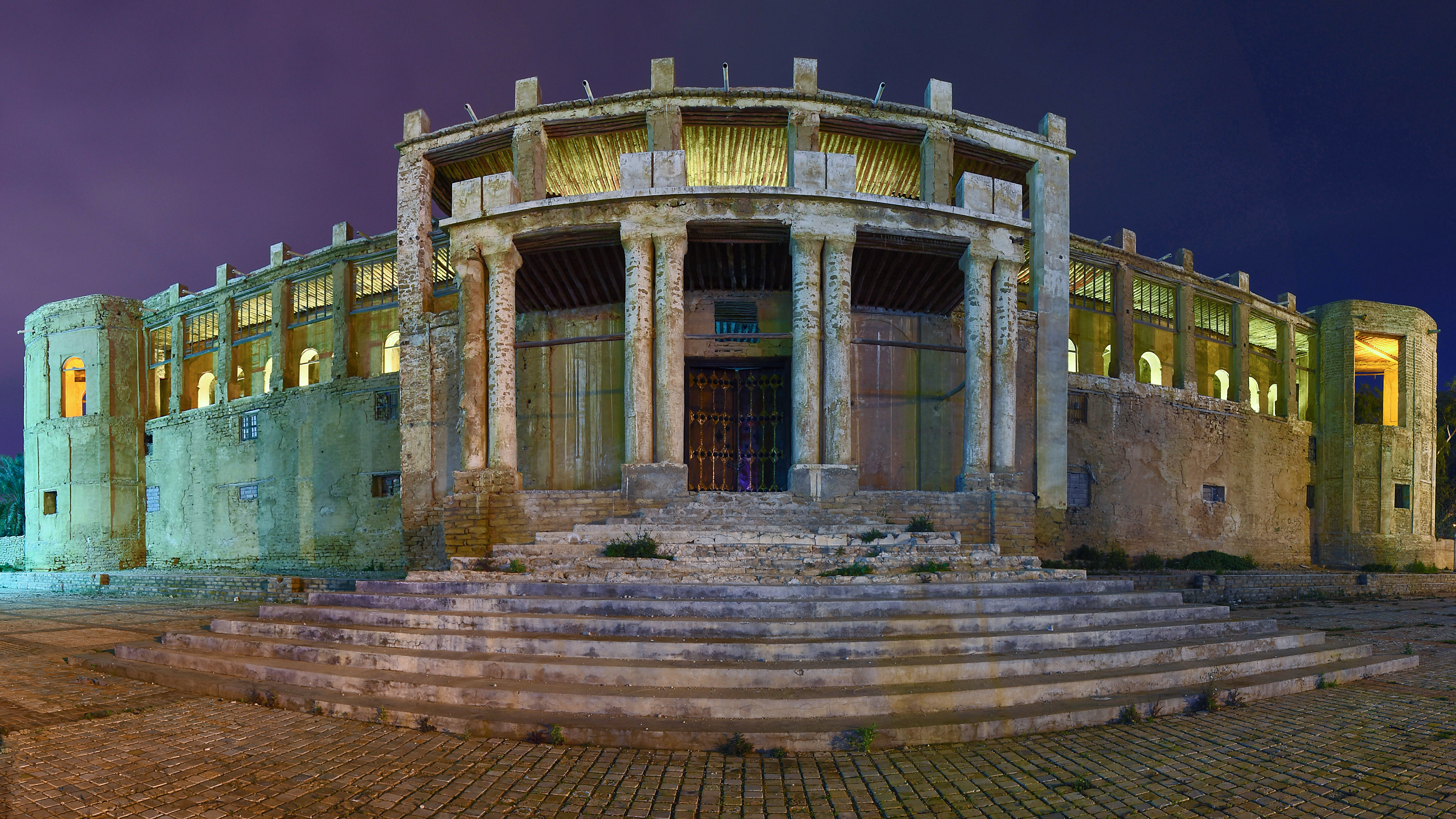
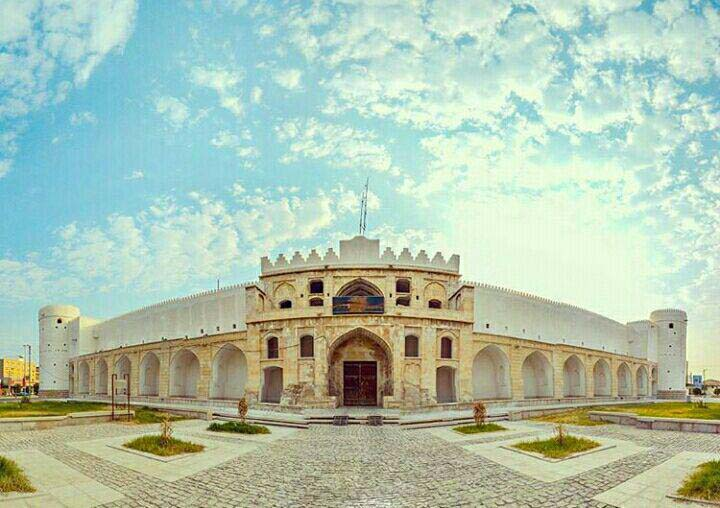
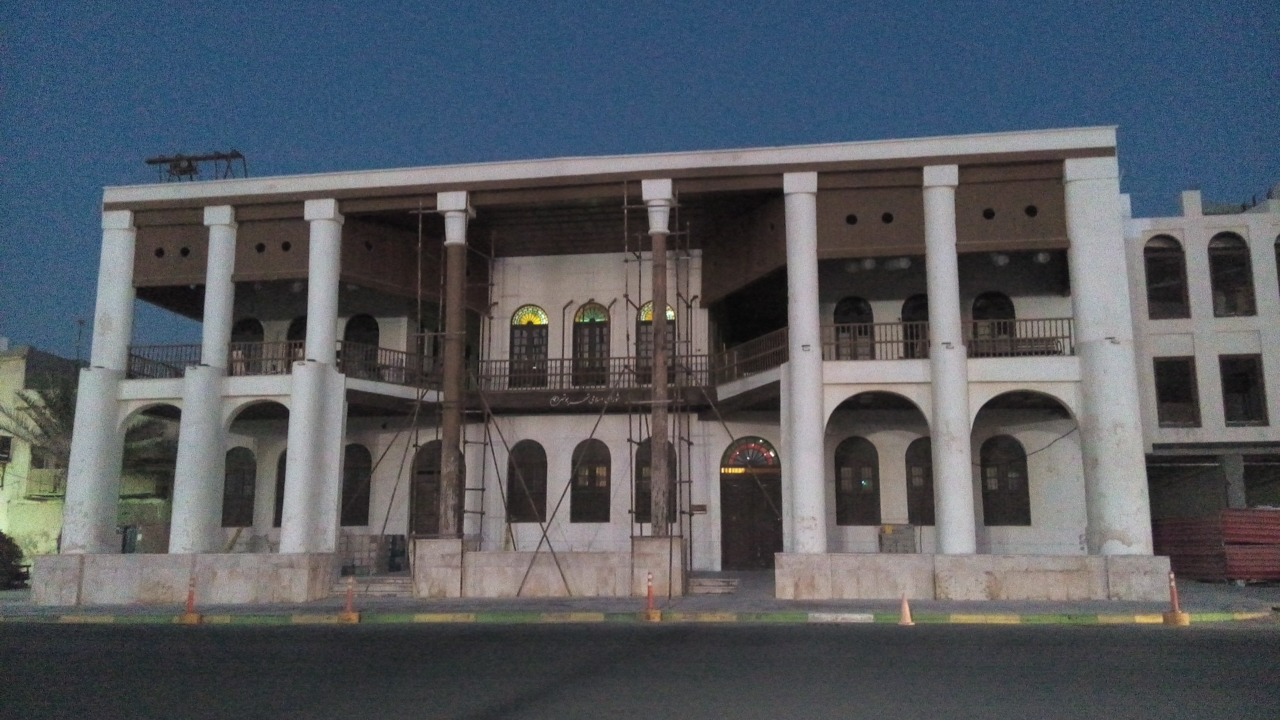
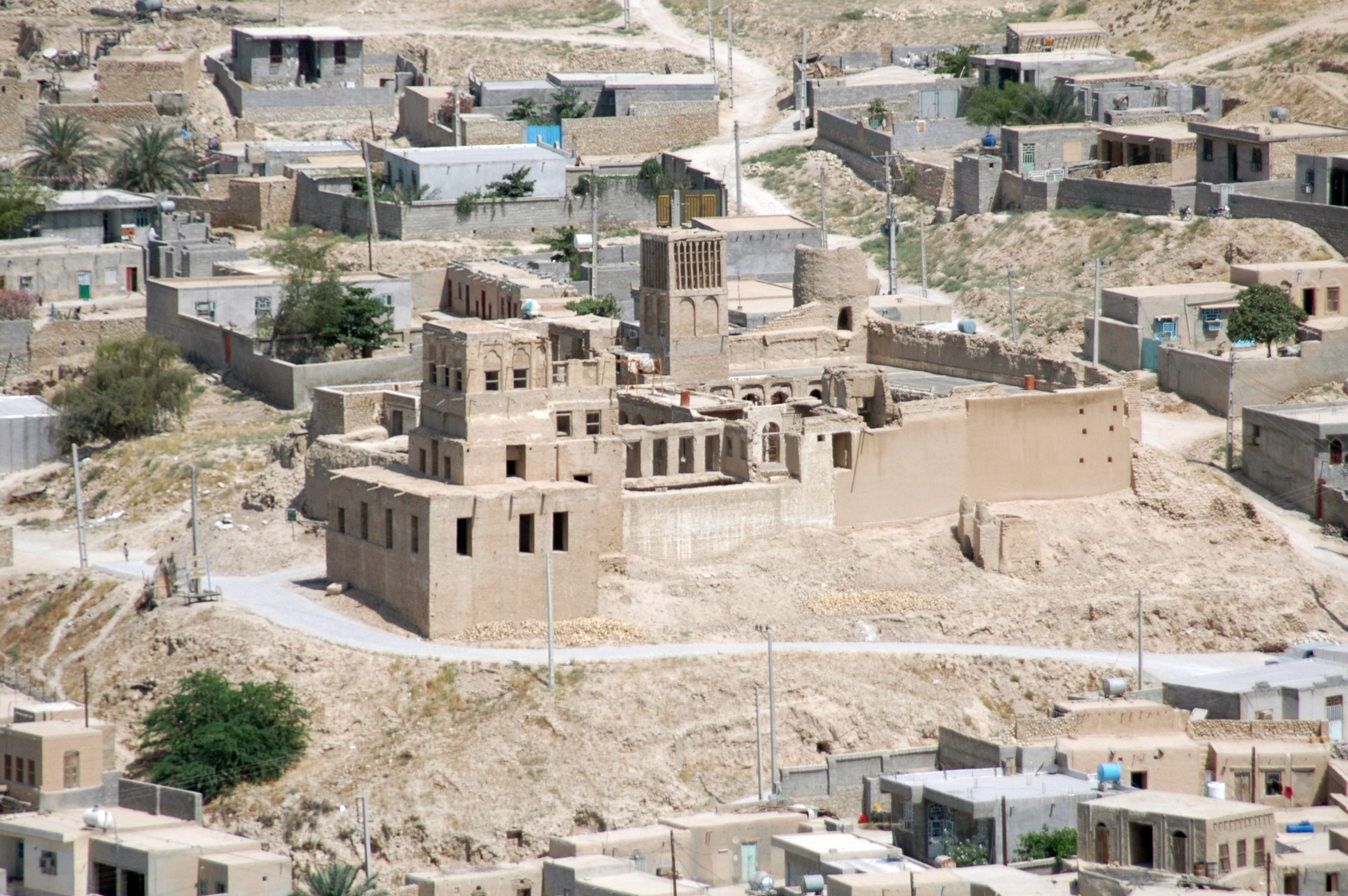
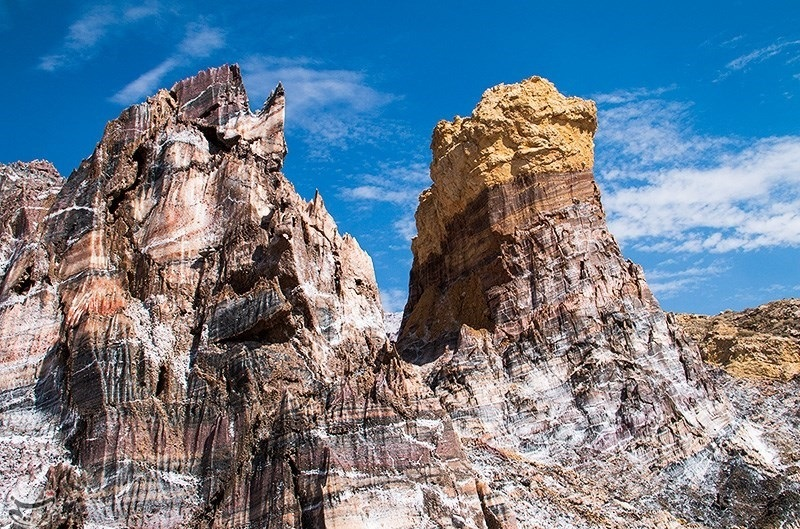
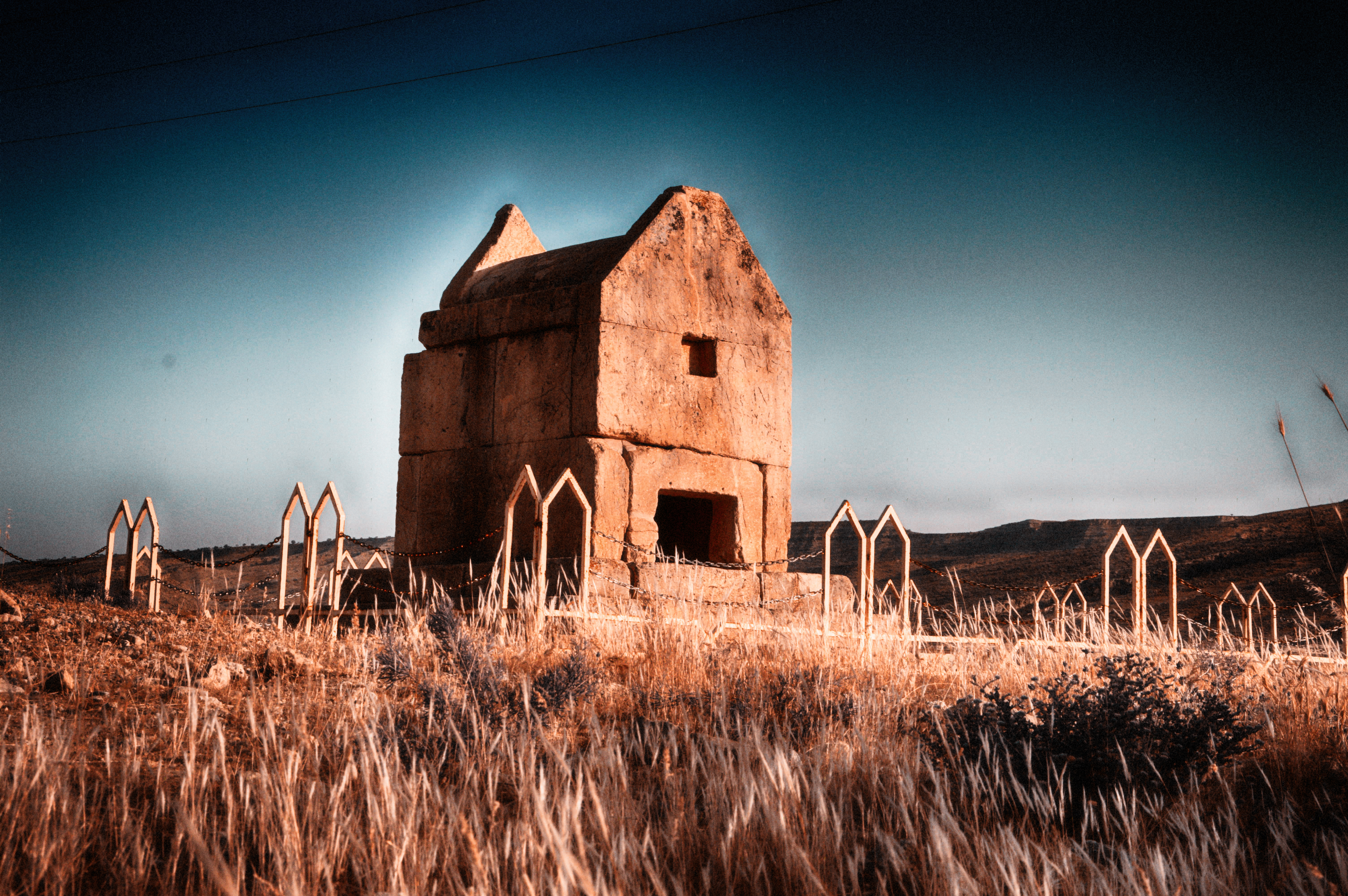

- Location of Bushehr Province within Iran

- Coordinates: 28°50′N 50°50′E
- Country: Iran
- Region: Region 2
- Capital: Bushehr
- Counties: 10

Government
  - Governor general: Arsalan Zare (Independent)

Area
  - Total: 22,743 km^{2} (8,781 sq mi)

Population (2016)
  - Total: 1,163,400
  - Density: 51.154/km^{2} (132.49/sq mi)
- Time zone: UTC+03:30 (IRST)
- Main language(s): Persian, Luri, Arabic and Turkic
- HDI (2017): 0.812 very high · 9th

Bushehr Province (Persian: استان بوشهر) (Note: Also romanized as Ostān-e Būšehr) is one of the 31 provinces of Iran. It is in the south of the country, with a long coastline on the Persian Gulf. Its capital is the city of Bushehr.

The province was made a part of Region 2 upon the division of the provinces into five regions, solely for coordination and development purposes, on 22 June 2014.

== History ==
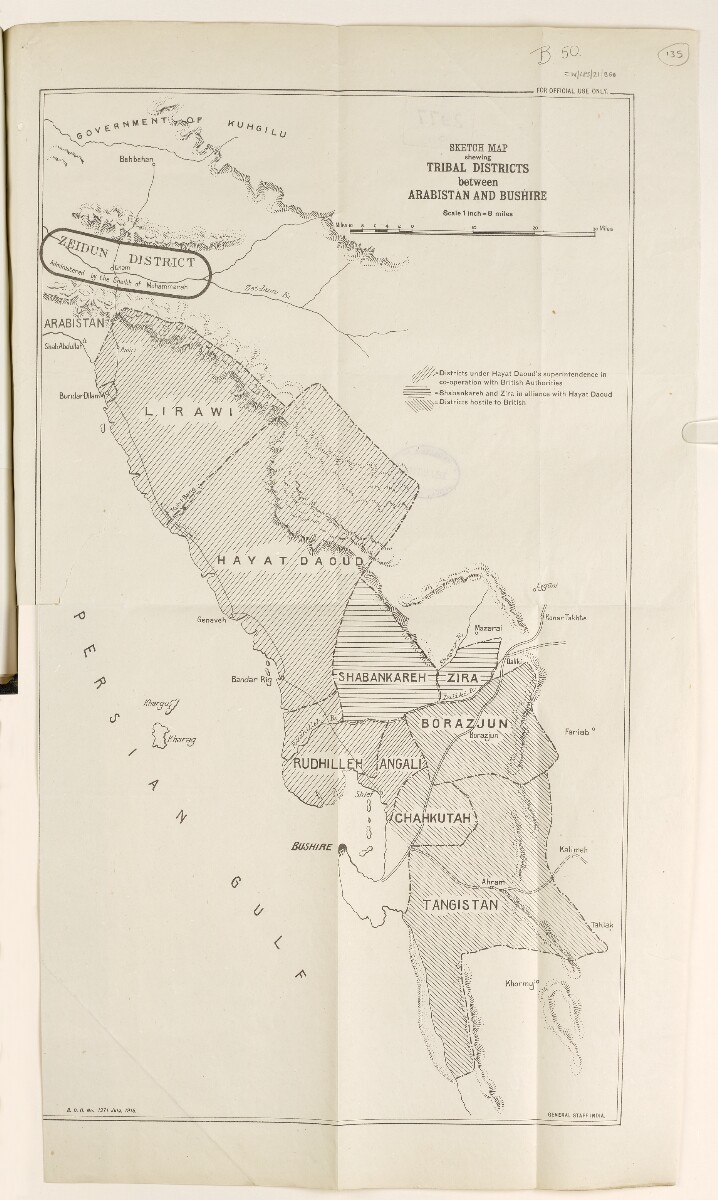
Political map showing different local tribal regions and alliances in the Bushehr area, 1915

The Portuguese Empire invaded the city of Bushehr in 1506 and remained there until Shah Abbas Safavi defeated them and liberated the Persian Gulf region.

=== 2013 Bushehr earthquake ===
A strong earthquake measuring 6.1 on the Richter magnitude scale struck the town of Shonbeh and villages of Shonbeh and Tasuj District in Dashti County of Bushehr province on 9 April 2013, killing at least 37 people.

== Demographics ==
=== Language ===
A vast majority of the population speak Persian (mostly the Fars dialect) as a first language. There is a minority of Arabic speakers.

During the Safavid period, some people from the Kurdish Zanganeh tribe moved from Kermanshah to the villages between Ahram and Borazjan and formed a local government in this area, and from that time until the beginning of Qajar, this part of Bushehr province was called Zanganeh bloc.

Bushehr linguistic composition
| language | percent |
| Dialects of Fars | 67.61% |
| Arabic | 9.59% |
| New Persian | 3.70% |
| Qashqai | 0.65% |
| Other, mixed | 18.45% |

=== Religion ===
The vast majority of Bushehr's population are Shia Muslims, with a minority of Sunnis comprising 8.5% of the province's population.

=== Population ===
At the time of the 2006 National Census, the province's population was 886,490 in 188,762 households. The following census in 2011 counted 1,032,949 people in 246,742 households. The 2016 census measured the population of the province as 1,163,400 inhabitants in 321,826 households.

=== Administrative divisions ===

The population history and structural changes of Bushehr province's administrative divisions over three consecutive censuses are shown in the following table.

Bushehr province
| Counties | 2006 | 2011 | 2016 |
|---|---|---|---|
| Asaluyeh (Note: Separated from Kangan County in 2013) | — | — | 73,958 |
| Bushehr | 216,087 | 258,906 | 298,594 |
| Dashtestan | 222,226 | 229,425 | 252,047 |
| Dashti | 71,285 | 77,530 | 92,319 |
| Deylam | 29,079 | 31,570 | 34,828 |
| Deyr | 48,488 | 52,523 | 60,612 |
| Ganaveh | 82,937 | 90,493 | 102,484 |
| Jam | 37,999 | 51,446 | 70,051 |
| Kangan | 95,113 | 170,774 | 107,801 |
| Tangestan | 63,276 | 70,282 | 76,706 |
| Total | 866,490 | 1,032,949 | 1,163,400 |

=== Cities ===
According to the 2016 census, 835,955 people (over 71% of the population of Bushehr province) live in the following cities:

| City | Population |
|---|---|
| Ab Pakhsh | 18,913 |
| Abdan | 6,827 |
| Ahram | 15,198 |
| Ali Shahr | 23,178 |
| Anarestan | 3,400 |
| Asaluyeh | 13,557 |
| Baduleh | 4,028 |
| Bandar Deylam | 25,730 |
| Bandar Ganaveh | 73,472 |
| Bandar Kangan | 60,187 |
| Bandar Rig | 6,252 |
| Bandar Siraf | 6,992 |
| Bandar-e Deyr | 24,083 |
| Bank | 14,126 |
| Bardestan | 7,112 |
| Borazjan | 110,567 |
| Bord Khun | 5,333 |
| Bushehr | 223,504 |
| Bushkan | 2,135 |
| Choghadak | 18,702 |
| Dalaki | 6,436 |
| Delvar | 4,442 |
| Dowrahak | 4,852 |
| Emam Hasan | 2,731 |
| Jam | 31,436 |
| Kaki | 12,119 |
| Kalameh | 2,463 |
| Kharg | 8,193 |
| Khvormuj | 60,942 |
| Nakhl Taqi | 18,837 |
| Riz | 3,282 |
| Sadabad | 8,248 |
| Shabankareh | 7,900 |
| Shahrabad | 3,787 |
| Shonbeh | 2,747 |
| Tang-e Eram | 3,242 |
| Vahdatiyeh | 11,222 |

== 21st century ==
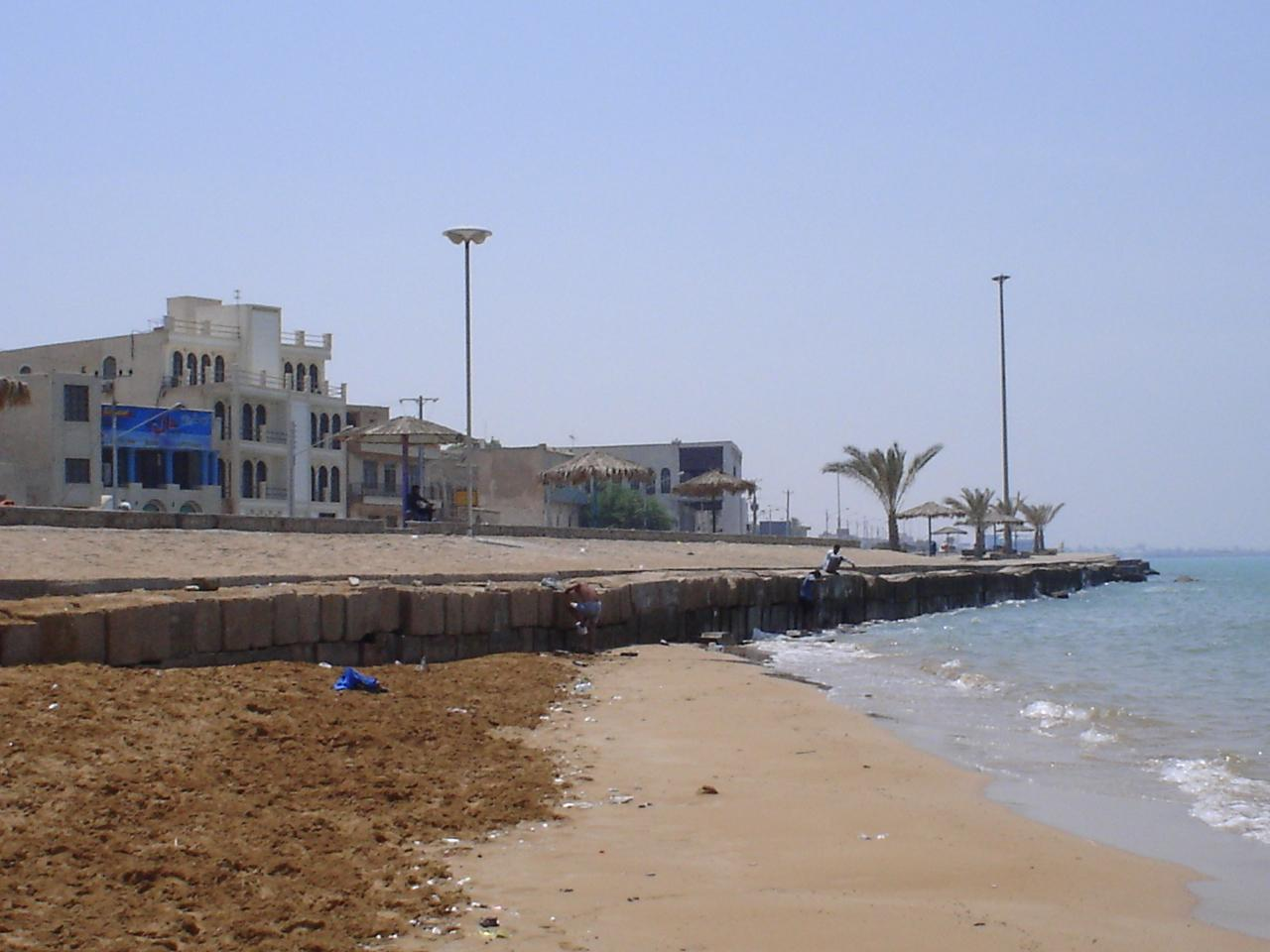
The coast in Bushehr by the Persian Gulf.

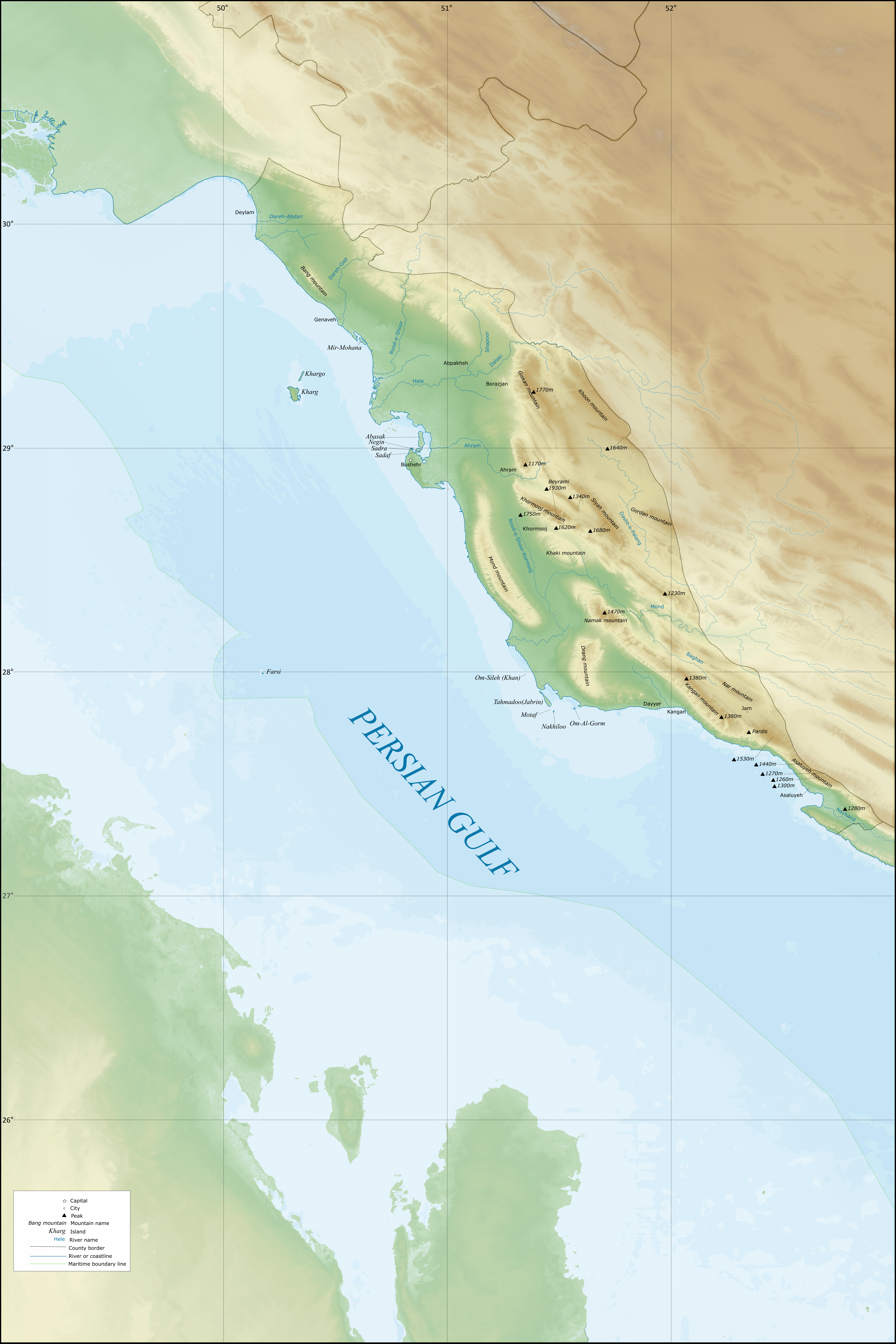
Topological and bathmetery map of Bushehr province

The city of Bushehr is the second main naval port of Iran after Bandar Abbas,:

=== Kharg Island (Khark Island) ===
As of March 2026, during the 2026 Iran War, Kharg Island was of great strategic significance, carrying up to 90 per cent of Iran's oil exports through its terminal.

=== Bushehr Nuclear Reactor ===
The Bushehr Light water PWR Nuclear Reactor, designed by Siemens, built by the Russians, is Iran's first Nuclear Power Plant reactor.

== Sports ==
Bushehr is home to the football teams Shahin-e Bushehr and Pars Jonoubi jam.

== Notable writers ==
- Manouchehr Atashi
- Sadeq Chubak
- Najaf Daryabandari
- Moniro Ravanipour

== Colleges and universities ==
- Persian Gulf University
- Bushehr University of Medical Sciences
- Payame Noor University of Bushehr

== See also ==
Media related to Bushehr Province at Wikimedia Commons
