= Esfand, Iran =

Esfand (Persian: اسفند) may refer to:

== Locations ==
- Esfand, Gilan
- Esfand, Hormozgan
- Esfand, Anbarabad, Kerman Province
- Esfand, Sirjan, Kerman Province
- Esfand, Sistan and Baluchestan

== Others ==
- Espand, Peganum harmala

== See also ==
- Esfandiyar (disambiguation)
