= Bast =

Bast may refer to:

== Places ==
- Bast, Afghanistan
- Bast, Baška Voda, a village in the Split-Dalmatia County in southern Croatia
- Bašť, a municipality and village in the Central Bohemian Region of the Czech Republic
- Bast, Iran, a village in Bushehr Province, Iran
- Bast, alternate name of Basut (disambiguation), places in Iran
- Bast-e Kheyrabad, a village in Fars Province, Iran

== Fiction ==
- Bast (Marvel Comics), Marvel Comics depiction of the goddess
- Bast, a character in the DC Comics series The Sandman
- Chief Bast, an Imperial officer from the film Star Wars
- Bast, Sadie Kane and Carter Kane's "guardian goddess" hosted from their cat Muffin from The Kane Chronicles
- The Basts, a family in E. M. Forster's 1910 novel Howards End

== Other uses ==
- Bast (asylum) in Iranian culture
- Bast (surname)
- Bast fibre, a type of plant fibre
- Bastet or Bast, a goddess in ancient Egyptian mythology
- Bundesanstalt für Straßenwesen (BASt), the German Federal institution for road issues; see Autobahn
- Bast (botany)
- Bast (horse), a Grade I winning American thoroughbred

== See also ==
- Bastable (disambiguation)
