= Liravi =

Liravi (Persian: دهستان لیراوی) may refer to:

- Liravi-ye Jonubi Rural District
- Liravi-ye Miyani Rural District
- Liravi-ye Shomali, Iran
- Liravi-ye Shomali Rural District
