= Qanat, Bushehr =

Qanat قنات
- Village
- Location within Iran
- Coordinates: 29°51′19″N 50°22′29″E
- Country: Iran
- Province: Bushehr
- County: Deylam
- Bakhsh: Imam Hassan
- Rural District: Liravi-ye Jonubi

Population (2006)
  - Total: 17
- Time zone: UTC+3:30 (IRST)
  - Summer (DST): UTC+4:30 (IRDT)

Qanat (Persian: قنات, also Romanized as Qanāt; also known as Ghanat) is a village in Liravi-ye Jonubi Rural District, Imam Hassan District, Deylam County, Bushehr Province, Iran. At the 2006 census, its population was 17, in 4 families.
