= Boneh-ye Khater =

Boneh-ye Khater بنه خاطر
- Village
- Location within Iran
- Coordinates: 30°06′22″N 50°14′00″E
- Country: Iran
- Province: Bushehr
- County: Deylam
- Bakhsh: Central
- Rural District: Howmeh

Population (2006)
  - Total: 214
- Time zone: UTC+3:30 (IRST)
  - Summer (DST): UTC+4:30 (IRDT)

Boneh-ye Khater (Persian: بنه خاطر, also Romanized as Boneh-ye Khāţer and Boneh Khāţer) is a village in Howmeh Rural District, in the Central District of Deylam County, Bushehr Province, Iran. At the 2006 census, its population was 214, in 46 families.
