= Goreh, Bushehr =

Goreh گره
- Village
- Location within Iran
- Coordinates: 29°53′59″N 50°27′05″E
- Country: Iran
- Province: Bushehr
- County: Deylam
- Bakhsh: Imam Hassan
- Rural District: Liravi-ye Miyani

Population (2006)
  - Total: 23
- Time zone: UTC+3:30 (IRST)
  - Summer (DST): UTC+4:30 (IRDT)

Goreh (Persian: گره, also Romanized as Gorrah and Gorreh; also known as Gūreh and Gurreh) is a village in Liravi-ye Miyani Rural District, Imam Hassan District, Deylam County, Bushehr Province, Iran. At the 2006 census, its population was 23, in 4 families.
