= Baba Hasan =

Baba Hasan (Persian: باباحسن) may refer to:

- Baba Hasan-e Jonubi
- Baba Hasan-e Shomali
- Baba Hassan (died 1683), ruler of Algiers
