= Liravi-ye Shomali =

Liravi-ye Shomali (Persian: لیراوی شمالی) may refer to:

- Liravi-ye Shomali, Iran
- Liravi-ye Shomali Rural District
