= Baba Hasan-e Shomali =

Baba Hasan-e Shomali باباحسن شمالي
- Village
- Location within Iran
- Coordinates: 29°58′51″N 50°18′21″E
- Country: Iran
- Province: Bushehr
- County: Deylam
- Bakhsh: Central
- Rural District: Liravi-ye Shomali

Population (2006)
  - Total: 35
- Time zone: UTC+3:30 (IRST)
  - Summer (DST): UTC+4:30 (IRDT)

Baba Hasan-e Shomali (Persian: باباحسن شمالي, also Romanized as Bābā Ḩasan-e Shomālī) is a village in Liravi-ye Shomali Rural District, in the Central District of Deylam County, Bushehr Province, Iran. At the 2006 census, its population was 35, in 6 families.
