= Ameri, Deylam =

Village in Bushehr province, Iran

Ameri Persian: عامري
- Village
- Location within Iran
- Coordinates: 30°09′57″N 50°11′01″E
- Country: Iran
- Province: Bushehr
- County: Deylam
- District: Central
- Rural District: Howmeh

Population (2016)
  - Total: 1,558
- Time zone: UTC+3:30 (IRST)

Ameri (Persian: عامري) (Note: Also romanized as ‘Āmerī, Āmerī, and Amri) is a village in, and the capital of, Howmeh Rural District in the Central District of Deylam County, Bushehr province, Iran.

== Demographics ==
=== Population ===
At the time of the 2006 National Census, the village's population was 1,580 in 316 households. The following census in 2011 counted 1,694 people in 431 households. The 2016 census measured the population of the village as 1,558 people in 443 households. It was the most populous village in its rural district.
