= Chah Talekh, Bushehr =

Village in Bushehr province, Iran

Chah Talekh Persian: چاه تلخ
- Village
- Location within Iran
- Coordinates: 29°53′32″N 50°16′49″E
- Country: Iran
- Province: Bushehr
- County: Deylam
- District: Emam Hasan
- Rural District: Liravi-ye Jonubi

Population (2016)
  - Total: 167
- Time zone: UTC+3:30 (IRST)

Chah Talekh (Persian: چاه تلخ) is a village in Liravi-ye Jonubi Rural District of Emam Hasan District (Note: Formerly Bahrgan District) in Deylam County, Bushehr province, Iran.

== Demographics ==
=== Population ===
At the time of the 2006 National Census, the village's population was 148 in 36 households. The following census in 2011 counted 132 people in 35 households. The 2016 census measured the population of the village as 167 people in 50 households.
