= Gazak =

Gazak or Gazk or Gezak (Persian: گزك) may refer to:

- Gazak, Bushehr
- Gezak, Fars
- Gazak, Kerman
- Gazk, Ravar, Kerman Province
- Gazak, Sistan and Baluchestan
- Gazak, Iranshahr, Sistan and Baluchestan Province
