= Bidu, Deylam =

Village in Bushehr province, Iran

Bidu Persian: بيدو
- Village
- Location within Iran
- Coordinates: 30°07′41″N 50°16′41″E
- Country: Iran
- Province: Bushehr
- County: Deylam
- District: Central
- Rural District: Howmeh

Population (2016)
  - Total: 263
- Time zone: UTC+3:30 (IRST)

Bidu (Persian: بيدو) (Note: Also romanized as Bidoo and Bīdū) is a village in Howmeh Rural District of the Central District in Deylam County, Bushehr province, Iran.

== Demographics ==
=== Population ===
At the time of the 2006 National Census, the village's population was 349 in 68 households. The following census in 2011 counted 263 people in 70 households. The 2016 census measured the population of the village as 263 people in 74 households.
