= Baztin =

Baztin بازتين
- Village
- Location within Iran
- Coordinates: 29°55′13″N 50°29′59″E
- Country: Iran
- Province: Bushehr
- County: Deylam
- Bakhsh: Imam Hassan
- Rural District: Liravi-ye Miyani

Population (2006)
  - Total: 92
- Time zone: UTC+3:30 (IRST)
  - Summer (DST): UTC+4:30 (IRDT)

Baztin (Persian: بازتين, also Romanized as Bāztīn; also known as Bāst and Bāstīn) is a village in Liravi-ye Miyani Rural District, Imam Hassan District, Deylam County, Bushehr Province, Iran. At the 2006 census, its population was 92, in 19 families.
