= Shahr-e Viran =

Shahr-e Viran or Shahr-e Veyran (Persian: شهرويران) may refer to:

- Shahr-e Viran, Bushehr
- Shahr-e Viran, West Azerbaijan
