= Valfajar =

Village in Bushehr province, Iran

Valfajar Persian: والفجر
- Village
- Location within Iran
- Coordinates: 29°56′13″N 50°26′43″E
- Country: Iran
- Province: Bushehr
- County: Deylam
- District: Emam Hasan
- Rural District: Liravi-ye Miyani

Population (2016)
  - Total: 138
- Time zone: UTC+3:30 (IRST)

Valfajar (Persian: والفجر) (Note: Also romanized as Vālfajar; formerly Gorbehi (گربه‌ای), also romanized as Gorbeh’ī; also known as Gowrbeh and Gurbehi) is a village in, and the capital of, Liravi-ye Miyani Rural District in Emam Hasan District (Note: Formerly Bahrgan District) of Deylam County, Bushehr province, Iran.

== Demographics ==
=== Population ===
At the time of the 2006 National Census, the village's population was 201 in 39 households. The following census in 2011 counted 173 people in 39 households. The 2016 census measured the population of the village as 138 people in 32 households. It was the most populous village in its rural district.

== Notable people ==
Iranian Cleric Abdul Hamid Khodri is from here.
