= Gaz Luri =

Village in Bushehr province, Iran

Gaz Luri Persian: گزلوري
- Village
- Location within Iran
- Coordinates: 30°02′00″N 50°20′06″E
- Country: Iran
- Province: Bushehr
- County: Deylam
- District: Central
- Rural District: Liravi-ye Shomali

Population (2016)
  - Total: 179
- Time zone: UTC+3:30 (IRST)

Gaz Luri (Persian: گزلوري) (Note: Also romanized as Gaz Lūrī and Gazloori; also known as Gas Lūrī) is a village in Liravi-ye Shomali Rural District (Note: Formerly Liravi Rural District) of the Central District in Deylam County, Bushehr province, Iran.

== Demographics ==
=== Population ===
At the time of the 2006 National Census, the village's population was 221 in 42 households. The following census in 2011 counted 202 people in 44 households. The 2016 census measured the population of the village as 179 people in 49 households.
