= Hesar, Bushehr =

Village in Bushehr province, Iran

Hesar Persian: حصار
- Village
- Location within Iran
- Coordinates: 29°51′46″N 50°15′46″E
- Country: Iran
- Province: Bushehr
- County: Deylam
- District: Emam Hasan
- Rural District: Liravi-ye Jonubi

Population (2016)
  - Total: 909
- Time zone: UTC+3:30 (IRST)

Hesar (Persian: حصار) (Note: Also romanized as Ḩaşār and Ḩeşār; also known as Hisar) is a village in Liravi-ye Jonubi Rural District of Emam Hasan District (Note: Formerly Bahrgan District) in Deylam County, Bushehr province, Iran.

== Demographics ==
=== Population ===
At the time of the 2006 National Census, the village's population was 806 in 185 households. The following census in 2011 counted 842 people in 224 households. The 2016 census measured the population of the village as 909 people in 234 households. It was the most populous village in its rural district.
