= Esfandiari =

Esfandiari (Persian: اسفندیاری, romanized: Esfandiyārī, lit. 'meaning related to Esfandiyār') may refer to the following:

- Esfandiari, Iran

== People with the surname Esfandiari ==
- Ahmad Esfandiari (1922–2012) Iranian painter
- Ali Esfandiari (1895–1960), known as Nima Yooshij, Iranian modern poet
- Antonio Esfandiari (born 1978), American professional poker player and magician
- Haleh Esfandiari (born 1940), Iranian academic
- Hassan Esfandiari (1867–1945), Iranian politician
- Khalil Esfandiary-Bakhtiary (1901–1983) also known as Khalil Esfandiari Bakhtiari, Iranian politician and diplomat
- Kristina Esfandiari (born 1988) American singer-songwriter
- Leila Esfandyari (1971–2011), also known as Leyla Esfandiari Kajoori Rad, Iranian mountaineer
- Musa Nuri Esfandiari (1894–1972) Iranian diplomat
- Pari Esfandiari, British businessperson
- Soraya Esfandiary-Bakhtiary (1932–2001), was Queen of Iran as the second wife of Shah Mohammad Reza Pahlavi
- Tim Esfandiari, known as Esfand, American Twitch streamer and YouTuber

== See also ==
- Esfandiyār (disambiguation)
