= Baba Hasan-e Jonubi =

Baba Hasan-e Jonubi باباحسن جنوبي
- Village
- Location within Iran
- Coordinates: 29°58′39″N 50°18′30″E
- Country: Iran
- Province: Bushehr
- County: Deylam
- Bakhsh: Central
- Rural District: Liravi-ye Shomali

Population (2006)
  - Total: 65
- Time zone: UTC+3:30 (IRST)
  - Summer (DST): UTC+4:30 (IRDT)

Baba Hasan-e Jonubi (Persian: باباحسن جنوبي, also Romanized as Bābā Ḩasan-e Jonūbī and Bābā Ḩasan-e Janūbī; also known as Bābā Ḩasanī, Bahasani, and Bah Ḩasanī) is a village in Liravi-ye Shomali Rural District, in the Central District of Deylam County, Bushehr Province, Iran. At the 2006 census, its population was 65, in 16 families.
