= Esfandiyār (disambiguation) =

Esfandiyār is a legendary Iranian hero and one of the characters of Ferdowsi's Shahnameh.

Esfandiyār, Esfaniyar or Esfandiar (Persian: اسفنديار) and similar transliterations may also refer to:

- Esfandiar (name)
- Esfandiar, Bushehr, a village in Bushehr Province, Iran
- Esfandiar, Khuzestan, a village in Khuzestan Province, Iran
- Esfandiar, South Khorasan, a village in South Khorasan Province, Iran

== See also ==
- İsfendiyar (disambiguation)
