= Gav Zard =

Gav Zard گاوزرد
- Village
- Location within Iran
- Coordinates: 29°58′08″N 50°23′01″E
- Country: Iran
- Province: Bushehr
- County: Deylam
- Bakhsh: Central
- Rural District: Liravi-ye Shomali

Population (2006)
  - Total: 216
- Time zone: UTC+3:30 (IRST)
  - Summer (DST): UTC+4:30 (IRDT)

Gav Zard (Persian: گاوزرد, also Romanized as Gāv Zard; also known as Gāhdar, Gāh Zard, Gazak, Gāzard, Geh Zard, and Gezak) is a village in Liravi-ye Shomali Rural District, in the Central District of Deylam County, Bushehr Province, Iran. At the 2006 census, its population was 216, in 43 families.
