= Shahr-e Viran, Bushehr =

Shahr-e Viran شهرويران
- Village
- Location within Iran
- Coordinates: 29°54′16″N 50°29′40″E
- Country: Iran
- Province: Bushehr
- County: Deylam
- Bakhsh: Imam Hassan
- Rural District: Liravi-ye Miyani

Population (2006)
  - Total: 19
- Time zone: UTC+3:30 (IRST)
  - Summer (DST): UTC+4:30 (IRDT)

Shahr-e Viran (Persian: شهرويران, also Romanized as Shahr-e Vīrān and Shahr-e Veyrān; also known as Sharviran and Shahr-e Veyrūn) is a village in Liravi-ye Miyani Rural District, Imam Hassan District, Deylam County, Bushehr Province, Iran. At the 2006 census, its population was 19, in 5 families.
