= Leylateyn =

Village in Bushehr province, Iran

Leylateyn Persian: ليلتين
- Village
- Location within Iran
- Coordinates: 29°54′54″N 50°13′59″E
- Country: Iran
- Province: Bushehr
- County: Deylam
- District: Emam Hasan
- Rural District: Liravi-ye Jonubi

Population (2016)
  - Total: 420
- Time zone: UTC+3:30 (IRST)

Leylateyn (Persian: ليلتين) (Note: Also romanized as Leylateyn and Līletīn) is a village in Liravi-ye Jonubi Rural District of Emam Hasan District (Note: Formerly Bahrgan District) in Deylam County, Bushehr province, Iran.

== Demographics ==
=== Population ===
At the time of the 2006 National Census, the village's population was 416 in 87 households. The following census in 2011 counted 461 people in 109 households. The 2016 census measured the population of the village as 420 people in 106 households.
