= Bahregan Airport =

Bahregan Airport فرودگاه بهرگان
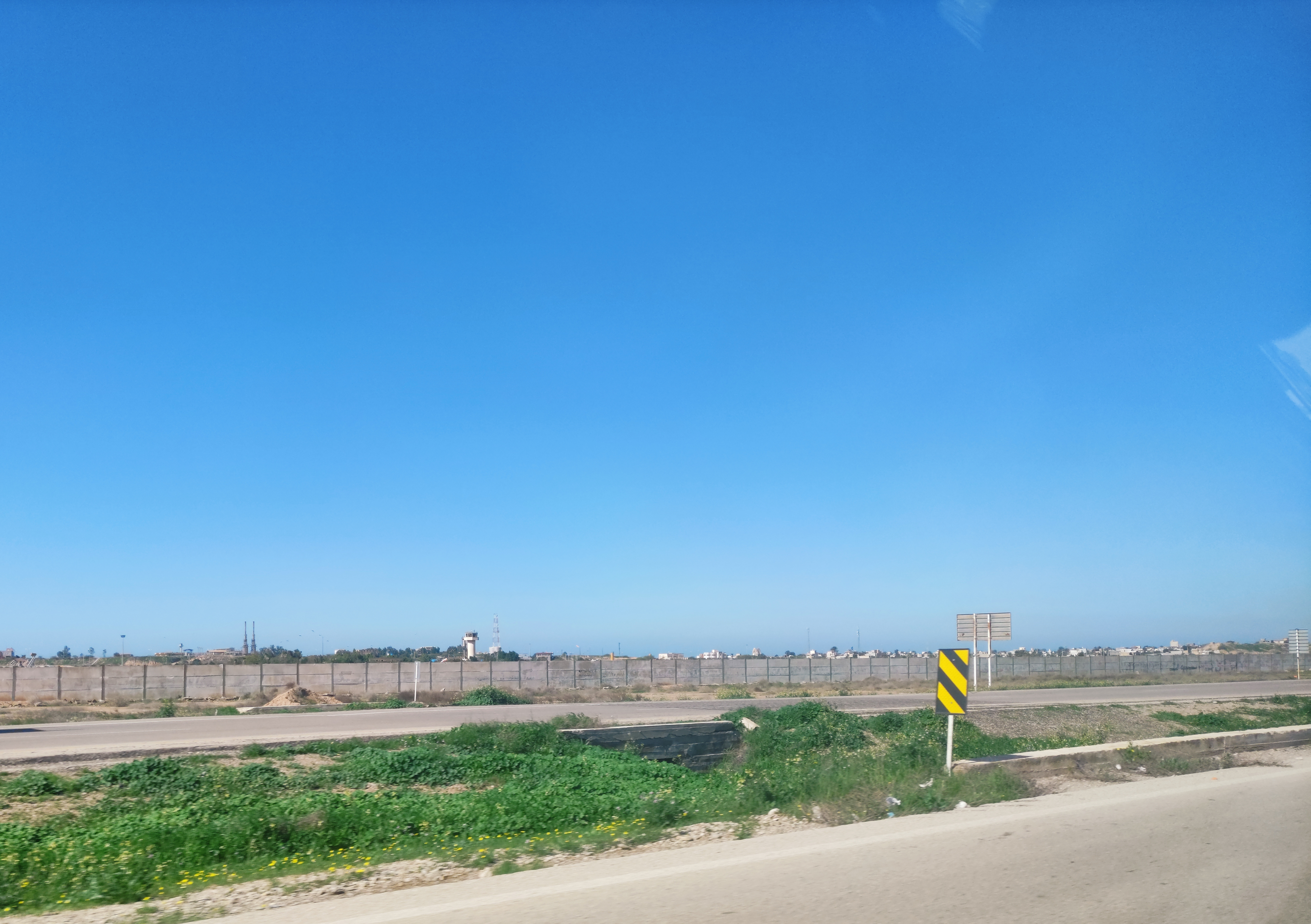
- IATA: IAQ; ICAO: OIBH

Summary
- Airport type: Public/Military
- Owner: Government of Iran
- Operator: Iran Airports Company/Iran Air Force
- Serves: Emam Hasan, Iran
- Location: Emam Hasan, Bushehr, Iran
- Elevation AMSL: 32 m / 105 ft
- Coordinates: 29°50′38″N 50°58′33″E

Map
- Location of the airport in Iran

Runways
Direction	Length		Surface
Direction	m	ft	Surface
15/33	2,201	7,221	Asphalt
- Source: SkyVector Aeronautical Charts

Bahregan Airport (IATA: IAQ, ICAO: OIBH) is a joint civil and military airport in the port city of Emam Hasan, located in Deylam County, Bushehr province, Iran.

== Background ==
The airport is named after the Bahregan oil field, which is located in Emam Hasan and is one of the main oil fields in the Persian Gulf. The airport was officially opened in 2016 to serve the employees of the Iranian Offshore Oil Company as well as increase tourism for the economic development of the region. It is located just outside of the city, near the site of the Bahregan Offshore Oil Company.

== Airlines and destinations ==
Airlines	Destinations
Karun Airlines	Isfahan, Shiraz, Tehran–Mehrabad

== See also ==
- Iran Civil Aviation Organization
- Transport in Iran
- List of airports in Iran
- List of the busiest airports in Iran
- List of airlines of Iran
