= Boneh-ye Esmail, Bushehr =

Village in Bushehr province, Iran

Boneh-ye Esmail Persian: بنه اسماعيل
- Village
- Location within Iran
- Coordinates: 30°04′35″N 50°15′43″E
- Country: Iran
- Province: Bushehr
- County: Deylam
- District: Central
- Rural District: Liravi-ye Shomali

Population (2016)
  - Total: 362
- Time zone: UTC+3:30 (IRST)

Boneh-ye Esmail (Persian: بنه اسماعيل) (Note: Also romanized as Boneh Esmā’īl, Boneh-e Esmā‘īl, and Boneh-ye Esmā‘īl; also known as Esma‘īl and Ismā‘īl) is a village in Liravi-ye Shomali Rural District (Note: Formerly Liravi Rural District) of the Central District in Deylam County, Bushehr province, Iran.

== Demographics ==
=== Population ===
At the time of the 2006 National Census, the village's population was 458 in 99 households. The following census in 2011 counted 423 people in 98 households. The 2016 census measured the population of the village as 362 people in 104 households.
