= Basut =

Basut or Besut (Persian: بسوت), also rendered as Basot or Bast, may refer to:

- Basut-e Bala
- Basut-e Hajji Hasan
