= Konar Kuh =

Village in Bushehr province, Iran

Konar Kuh Persian: كناركوه
- Village
- Location within Iran
- Coordinates: 30°08′30″N 50°14′38″E
- Country: Iran
- Province: Bushehr
- County: Deylam
- District: Central
- Rural District: Howmeh

Population (2016)
  - Total: 348
- Time zone: UTC+3:30 (IRST)

Konar Kuh (Persian: كناركوه) (Note: Also romanized as Kenar Kooh, Kenār Kūh, and Konār Kūh) is a village in Howmeh Rural District of the Central District in Deylam County, Bushehr province, Iran.

== Demographics ==
=== Population ===
At the time of the 2006 National Census, the village's population was 327 in 69 households. The following census in 2011 counted 337 people in 81 households. The 2016 census measured the population of the village as 348 people in 99 households.
