= Agha Khan Liravi-ye Castle =

Castle in Bushehr province, Iran

Coordinates: 29.8625°N 50.2631°E

Agha Khan Liravi-ye castle
- قلعه آقا خان لیراوی
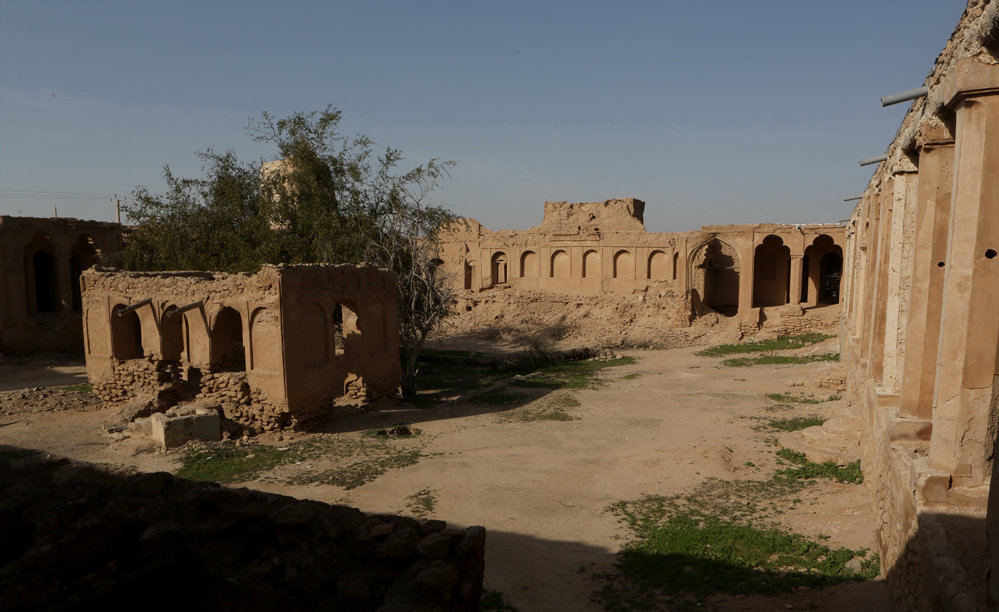
- Interactive map of the Agha Khan Liravi-ye castle area

General information
- Type: Castle
- Location: Deylam County, Iran

Agha Khan Liravi-ye castle (Persian: قلعه آقا خان لیراوی) is a historic castle located in Deylam County, Bushehr province, Iran. The fortress was built in the Qajar era.
