= Emam Hasan, Iran =

City in Bushehr province, Iran

Emam Hasan Persian: امام حسن
- City
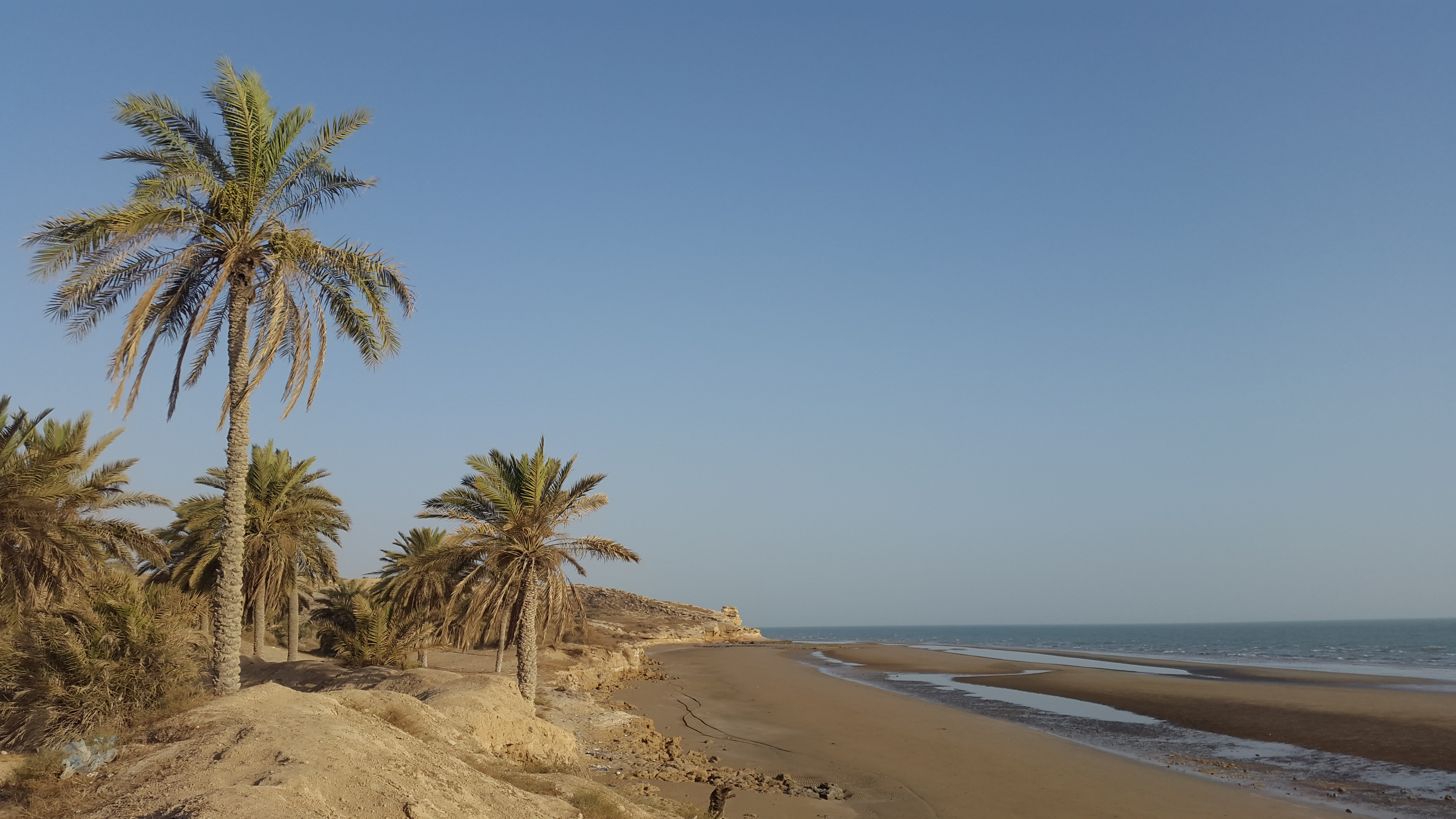
- Persian Gulf coastline at Emam Hasan

- Location within Iran
- Coordinates: 29°50′26″N 50°15′49″E
- Country: Iran
- Province: Bushehr
- County: Deylam
- District: Emam Hasan
- Established as a city: 1999

Population (2016)
  - Total: 2,731
- Time zone: UTC+3:30 (IRST)

Emam Hasan (Persian: امام حسن) (Note: Also romanized as Imām Hasan and Imam Hassan) is a port city in, and the capital of, Emam Hasan District (Note: Formerly Bahrgan District) in Deylam County, Bushehr province, Iran. It also serves as the administrative center for Liravi-ye Jonubi Rural District. The village of Emam Hasan was converted to a city in 1999.

== Demographics ==
=== Population ===
At the time of the 2006 National Census, the city's population was 2,156 in 461 households. The following census in 2011 counted 2,498 people in 618 households. The 2016 census measured the population of the city as 2,731 people in 749 households.

== Transportation ==
The main airport connecting the city with other parts of Iran is the Bahregan Airport, located near the site of the Bahregan Oil Company, just outside of the city.

== See also ==
Media related to Imam Hassan, Iran at Wikimedia Commons
