= Seljuk stucco figures =

Carved figures from the Seljuk Empire

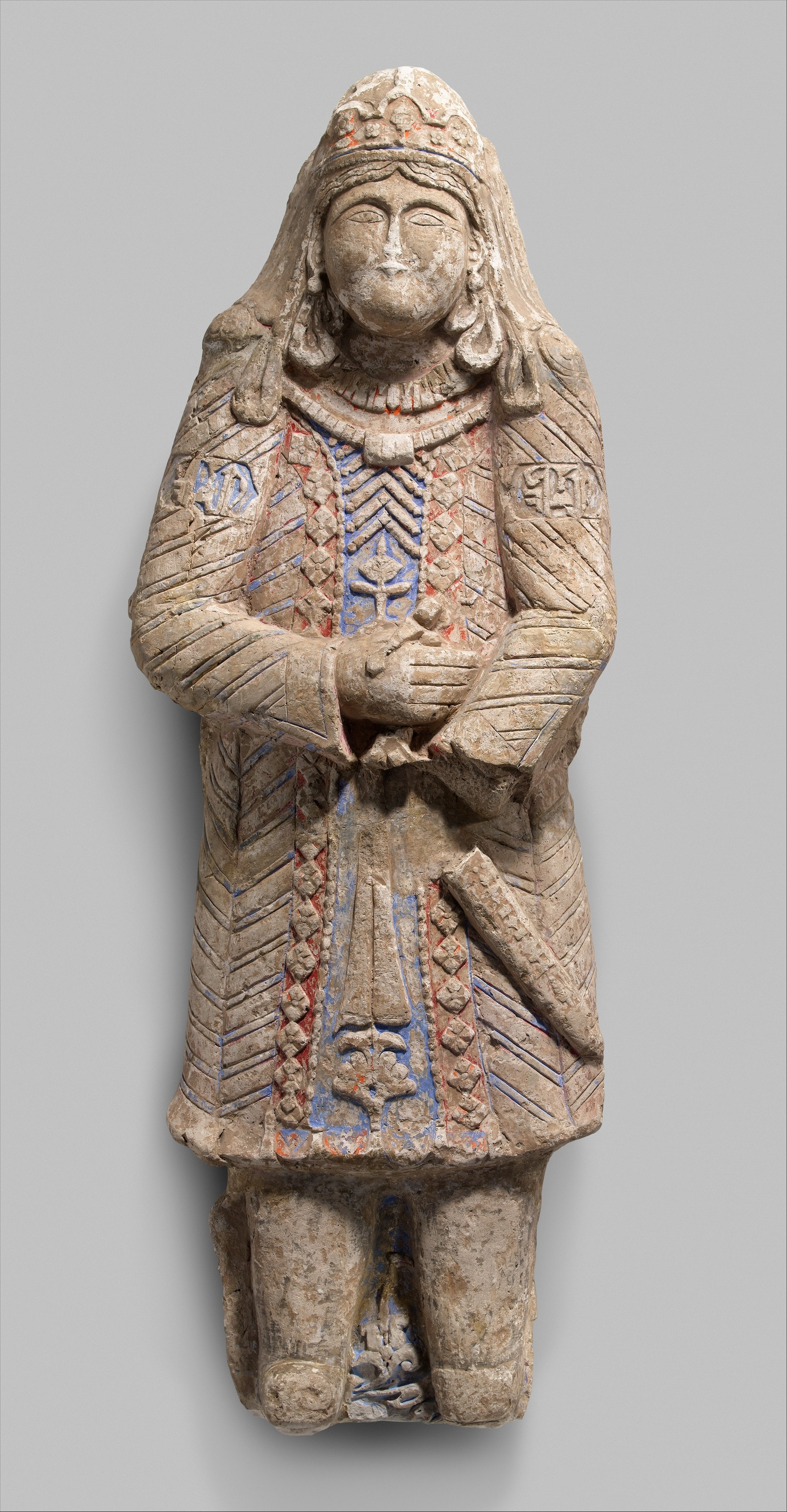
A royal Seljuk figure made of stucco displayed in the Metropolitan Museum of Art. This figure might decorate the wall of a 12th-century Seljuk palace.

The Seljuk stucco figures are stucco (plaster) figures found in the region of the Seljuk Empire, from its "golden age" between the 11th and 13th centuries. They decorated the inner walls and friezes of Seljuk palaces, together with other ornamented stucco ornaments, concealing the wall behind them. The figures were painted bright-colored and often gilded. They represented royal figures and were symbols of power and authority.

== Islamic art of Seljuk ==
The Seljuks were a Turkic dynasty of Central Asian nomadic origins, who became the new rulers of the eastern Islamic world after defeating the Ghaznavids in the Battle of Dandanaqan, and the Buyid dynasty. Following these victories, the Seljuks established themselves as the new patrons of the Abbasid Caliphate and Sunni Islam. In only half-a-century, the Seljuks managed to create a vast empire encompassing modern Iran, Iraq, and much of Anatolia. Under the Seljuks, Iran enjoyed a period of cultural prosperity. Multitudes of architecture and arts were developed during the period, and influenced later artistic developments in the region and the surrounding.

In ceramics, fine motifs were created in underglaze painting, luster decorations, and polychrome painting. Metal objects were decorated with inlays of silver and gold. The Seljuks developed many figurative motifs with a frequent depiction of animals, men, and women. An anthropomorphic representation of figures are not rare at all in the Muslim culture. Whereas iconic image in holy places e.g. mosques are strictly forbidden, in secular places, depiction of figures are common.

Other forms of Seljuk art are discussed in the page on the Seljuk Empire.

== Seljuk palaces ==
All the Seljuk palaces are now in ruins. Excavations indicate that these palaces had once been decorated with tiles and with stucco wall reliefs of geometric patterns and figures. In Lashgari Bazar, a ruin of former Ghaznavid period palace, polychrome frescoes depicting 44 soldiers were found decorating the lower floor of the audience hall. They all have similar round faces and almond-shaped eyes, traditionally associated with the Turks of Central Asia.

The stucco figures would have decorated similar royal palaces in the audience hall or the royal court. They were found decorating large palaces of the Seljuk sultans, or smaller royal courts of the local vassals or successors. The stucco figures may be part of larger stucco geometric ornamentation which conceals the base wall behind it. One example of stucco figures in complete form comes from the late 12th century Rey, which depicts the enthroned Seljuk Sultan Tughril II (1194) surrounded by his officers. Similar examples were found in Bast, Afghanistan, in Samarkand, and in Uzbekistan. These were painted in bright colors of red, blue, black, and gilded with gold. The dark room in the palace where they were placed means that this figure needs to stand out as much as possible.

== Form ==
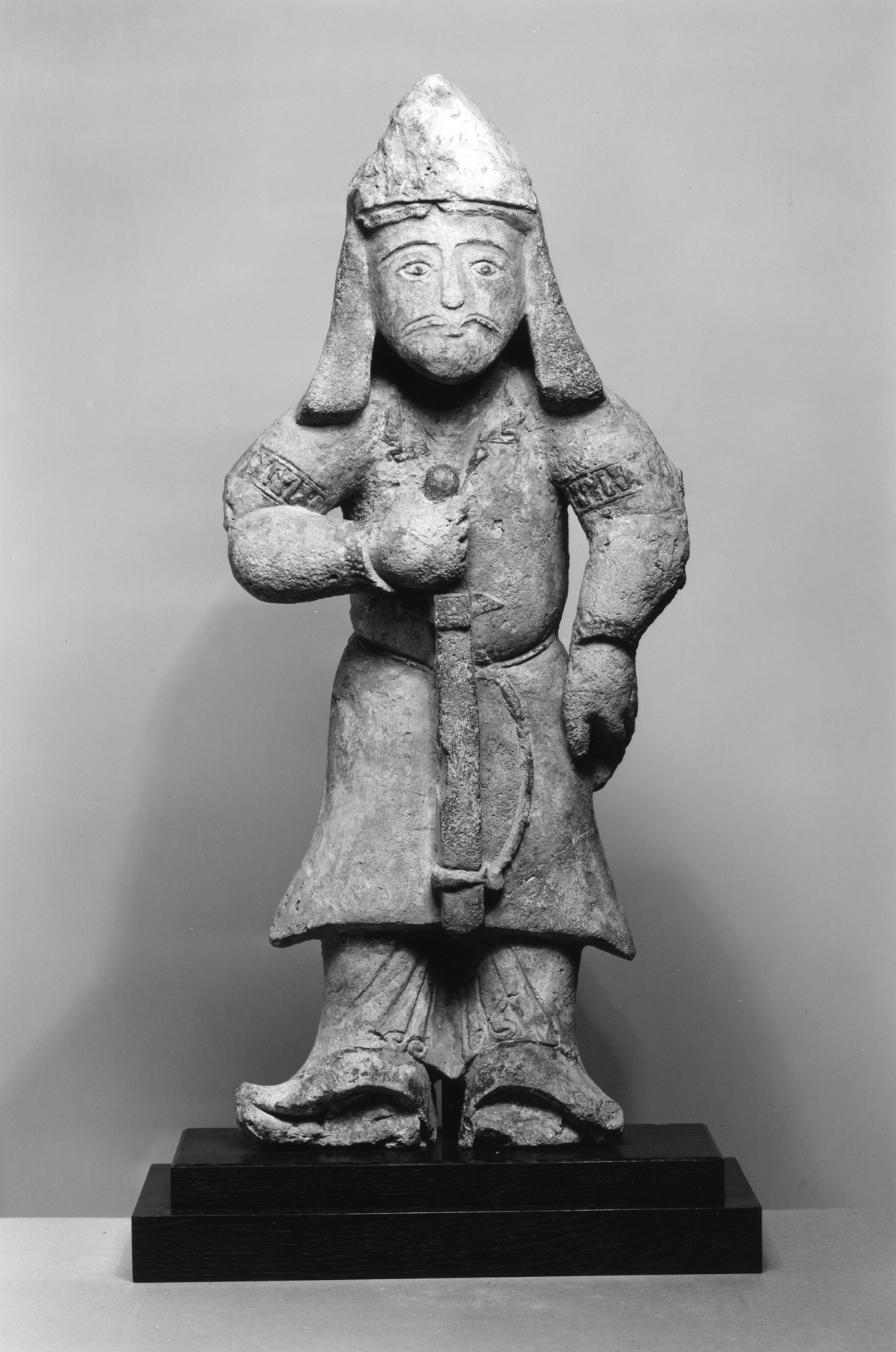
Stucco figures of a warrior discovered in Iran. This is painted with red, blue, black, and gilded with gold.

Stucco or plaster is a soft, cement-like water-based material that is easy to carve when dry and mold when still wet. Its lightness makes it easy to affix to walls. Many 12th-century stucco figures survived in pristine condition because of the preserving dryness of the desert where they were found. Seljuk stucco figures were painted in bright colors of blue (powdered lapis lazuli), red (powdered ruby), and black colors, and were gilded with gold.

The figures were representations of power. In a royal palace setting, they represent figures related to the power of the empire, e.g. royal guards, royal viziers, courtiers or amir. Warrior figures were depicted as clutching swords. They wear rich colored caftans, trousers, tiraz bands, and long boots. Royal figures were depicted wearing crowns. The two figures in the Metropolitan Museum of Art in New York are wearing crowns, one figure is wearing the winged crown, an ancient symbol of authority which was first recorded in a 3rd-century Sasanian coins. All of the Seljuk stucco figures have round faces with typical high cheekbones and almond-shaped eyes, known as the Turkic moon face, which reflect the indicating the Turkic and Mongol ethnic type. The stucco figures were usually displayed in a pomp and circumstance setting, enhancing the actual ceremonies that took place in the room where the figures were set.

== Cited works ==
- Öney, Gônùl (1984). REFLECTION OF GHAZNAVID PALACE DECORATION ON ANATOLIAN SELJUK PALACE DECORATION. ASTM. Vol. III. Izmir: EÜ. Edebiyat Fakültesi.
- Yalman, Suzan (2001). "The Art of the Seljuqs of Iran (ca. 1040–1196)". The Metropolitan Museum of Art.
