= Kuh Kenar =

Kuh Kenar (Persian: كوه كنار) may refer to:

- Kuh Kenar, Ardabil
- Kuh Kenar, Sistan and Baluchestan

== See also ==
- Kenar Kuh
