= Hesar Castle =

Castle in Bushehr Province, Iran

Hesar castle
- قلعه حصار

General information
- Type: Castle
- Location: Deylam County, Iran

Hesar castle (Persian: قلعه حصار) is a historical castle located in Deylam County in Bushehr Province, The longevity of this fortress dates back to the Qajar dynasty.
