= Esfandiari, Iran =

Esfandiari اسفندياري
- Village
- Location within Iran
- Coordinates: 29°52′49″N 50°29′02″E
- Country: Iran
- Province: Bushehr
- County: Deylam
- Bakhsh: Imam Hassan
- Rural District: Liravi-ye Miyani

Population (2006)
  - Total: 25
- Time zone: UTC+3:30 (IRST)
  - Summer (DST): UTC+4:30 (IRDT)

Esfandiari (Persian: اسفندياري, also Romanized as Esfandīārī and Esfandeyārī; also known as Esfandīār and Esfandiyar) is a village in Liravi-ye Miyani Rural District, Imam Hassan District, Deylam County, Bushehr Province, Iran. At the 2006 census, its population was 25, in 6 families.
