= Siah Makan-e Bozorg =

Village in Bushehr province, Iran

Siah Makan-e Bozorg Persian: سياه مكان بزرگ
- Village
- Location within Iran
- Coordinates: 30°03′45″N 50°19′32″E
- Country: Iran
- Province: Bushehr
- County: Deylam
- District: Central
- Rural District: Liravi-ye Shomali

Population (2016)
  - Total: 702
- Time zone: UTC+3:30 (IRST)

Siah Makan-e Bozorg (Persian: سياه مكان بزرگ) (Note: Also romanized as Sīāh Makān-e Bozorg; also known as Līrāvī-ye Shomālī, Seyāh Makān ‘Olyā, Sīā Makān, Sīā Makān-e Bozorg, Sīāh Makān, Sīāh Makan-e Bālā, Sīāh Makān-e Bālā Bozorg, Sīāh Makan ‘Olyā, and Sīāh Makān-e ‘Olyā) is a village in, and the capital of, Liravi-ye Shomali Rural District (Note: Formerly Liravi Rural District) in the Central District of Deylam County, Bushehr province, Iran.

== Demographics ==
=== Population ===
At the time of the 2006 National Census, the village's population was 824 in 154 households. The following census in 2011 counted 799 people in 180 households. The 2016 census measured the population of the village as 702 people in 179 households. It was the most populous village in its rural district.
