= Bandar Deylam =

City in Bushehr province, Iran

Bandar-e Deylam Persian: بندر دیلم
- City
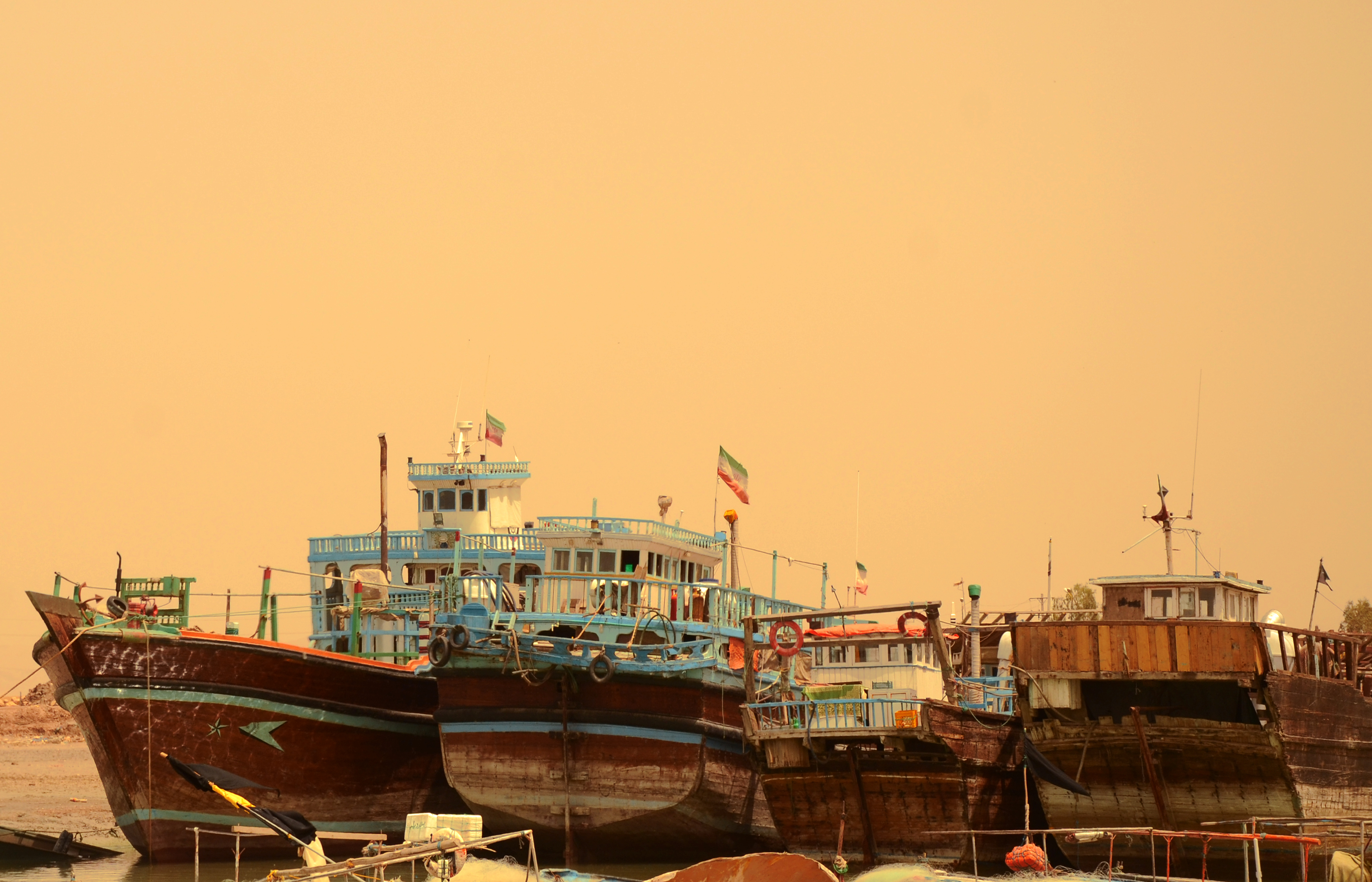
- Boats at Bandar Deylam

- Location within Iran
- Coordinates: 30°03′18″N 50°09′55″E
- Country: Iran
- Province: Bushehr
- County: Deylam
- District: Central

Population (2016)
  - Total: 25,730
- Time zone: UTC+3:30 (IRST)

Bandar Deylam (Persian: بندر دیلم) (Note: Also romanized as Bandar Dīlam and Bandar-e Deylam; also known as Bandar-e Delam, Deylam, and Dīlam) is a port city in the Central District of Deylam County, Bushehr province, Iran, serving as capital of both the county and the district.

== Demographics ==
=== Population ===
At the time of the 2006 National Census, the city's population was 19,829 in 4,426 households. The following census in 2011 counted 22,393 people in 5,603 households. The 2016 census measured the population of the city as 25,730 people in 7,359 households.

On 16 February 2005 a large explosion was reported close to the site of a newly built nuclear power plant. Iranian officials later announced that the explosion was caused by construction work on a dam at Kowsar, near Deylam.

== Climate ==
Climate data for Bandar Deylam (2001-2005)
Month	Jan	Feb	Mar	Apr	May	Jun	Jul	Aug	Sep	Oct	Nov	Dec	Year
Mean daily maximum °C (°F)	18.0 (64.4)	20.7 (69.3)	25.8 (78.4)	30.7 (87.3)	36.9 (98.4)	39.5 (103.1)	40.3 (104.5)	39.3 (102.7)	37.0 (98.6)	33.9 (93.0)	26.3 (79.3)	20.1 (68.2)	30.7 (87.3)
Daily mean °C (°F)	14.0 (57.2)	15.9 (60.6)	20.0 (68.0)	25.1 (77.2)	30.6 (87.1)	33.4 (92.1)	34.6 (94.3)	33.7 (92.7)	30.5 (86.9)	27.0 (80.6)	20.8 (69.4)	16.0 (60.8)	25.1 (77.2)
Mean daily minimum °C (°F)	10.0 (50.0)	11.1 (52.0)	14.2 (57.6)	19.6 (67.3)	24.3 (75.7)	27.3 (81.1)	28.9 (84.0)	28.0 (82.4)	24.0 (75.2)	20.1 (68.2)	15.2 (59.4)	11.9 (53.4)	19.6 (67.2)
Average precipitation mm (inches)	123.7 (4.87)	8.9 (0.35)	24.6 (0.97)	11.5 (0.45)	0.8 (0.03)	0.0 (0.0)	0.0 (0.0)	0.0 (0.0)	0.0 (0.0)	0.5 (0.02)	30.6 (1.20)	128.8 (5.07)	329.4 (12.96)
Average relative humidity (%)	78	62	54	58	50	48	49	57	55	56	60	73	58
Source: IRIMO

== See also ==
Media related to Bandar Deylam at Wikimedia Commons
