= İsfendiyar =

İsfendiyar may refer to:

- İsfendiyar Bey
- Isfendiyar Principality
- İsfendiyar Mountains
- Isfendiyar, a spelling variant of Esfandiyār, a legendary Persian hero

== See also ==
- Esfandiyār (disambiguation)
