= Esfand, Sistan and Baluchestan =

Esfand اسفند
- Village
- Location within Iran
- Coordinates: 26°53′23″N 59°03′53″E
- Country: Iran
- Province: Sistan and Baluchestan
- County: Dalgan
- Bakhsh: Jolgeh-ye Chah Hashem
- Rural District: Jolgeh-ye Chah Hashem

Population (2006)
  - Total: 2,469
- Time zone: UTC+3:30 (IRST)
  - Summer (DST): UTC+4:30 (IRDT)

Esfand (Persian: اسفند; also known as Espān, Ispān, and Ispand) is a village in Jolgeh-ye Chah Hashem Rural District, Jolgeh-ye Chah Hashem District, Dalgan County, Sistan and Baluchestan Province, Iran. At the 2006 census, its population was 2,469, with 447 families.
