= Forouz gas field =

Iranian natural gas field

Forouz
- Country: Iran
- Region: Persian Gulf
- Offshore/onshore: offshore
- Operator: National Iranian Oil Company

Field history
- Discovery: 2010
- Start of production: 2010

Production
- Current production of gas: 70×10^{6} m^{3}/d 2.45×10^{9} cu ft/d 25.6×10^{9} m^{3}/a (900×10^{9} cu ft/a)
- Estimated gas in place: 700×10^{9} m^{3} 24.5×10^{12} cu ft

The Forouz gas field is an Iranian natural gas field that was discovered in 2010. It began production in 2010 and produces natural gas and condensates. The total proven reserves of the Forouz gas field are around 24.5 trillion cubic feet (700 billion m^{3}) and production is slated to be around 2.45 billion cubic feet/day (70 million m^{3}).
