= Bašť =

Municipality in the Czech Republic

- Municipality
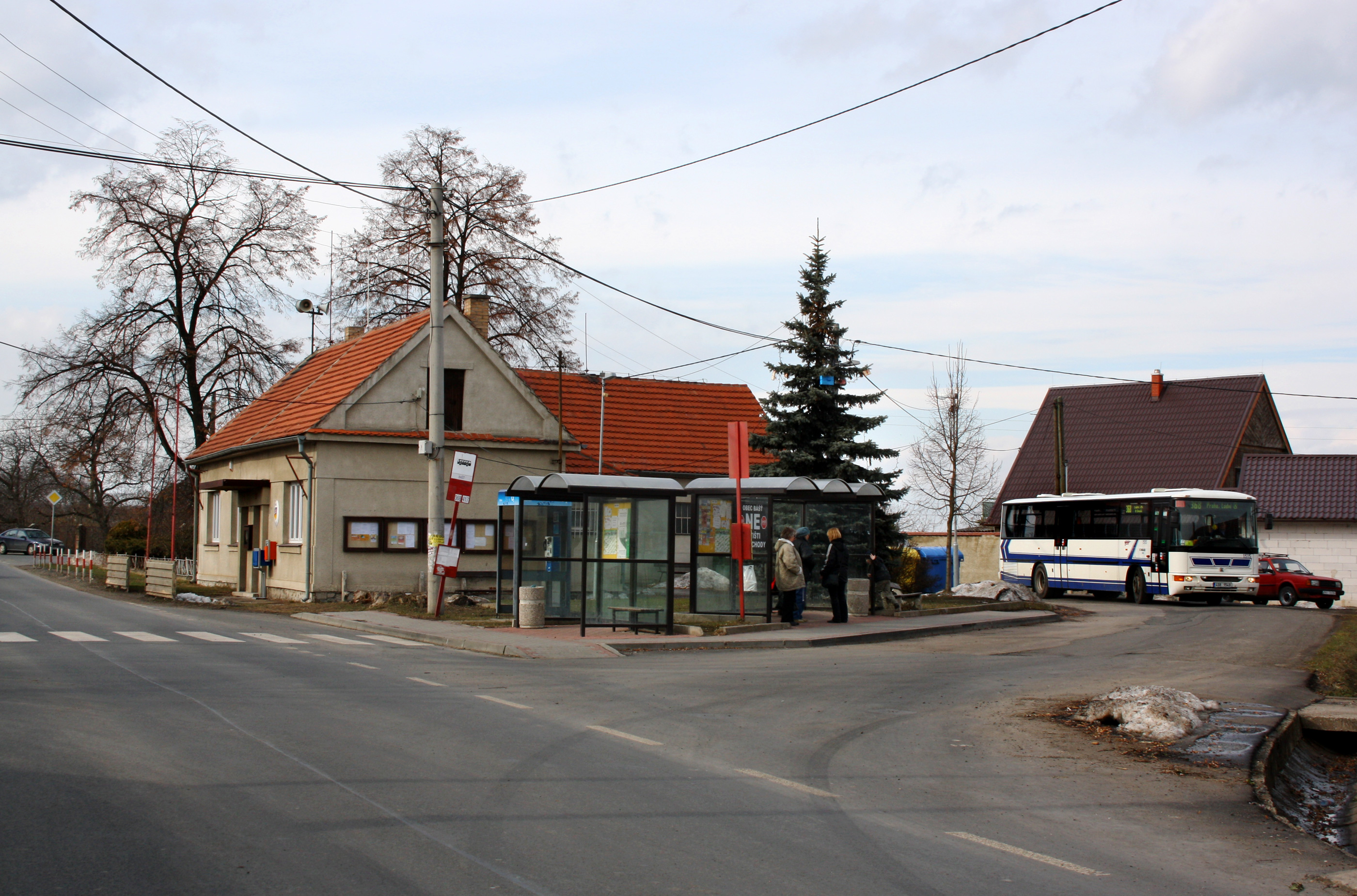
- Centre of Bašť

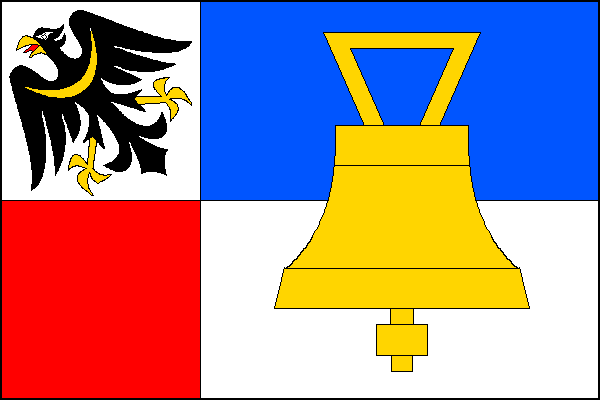
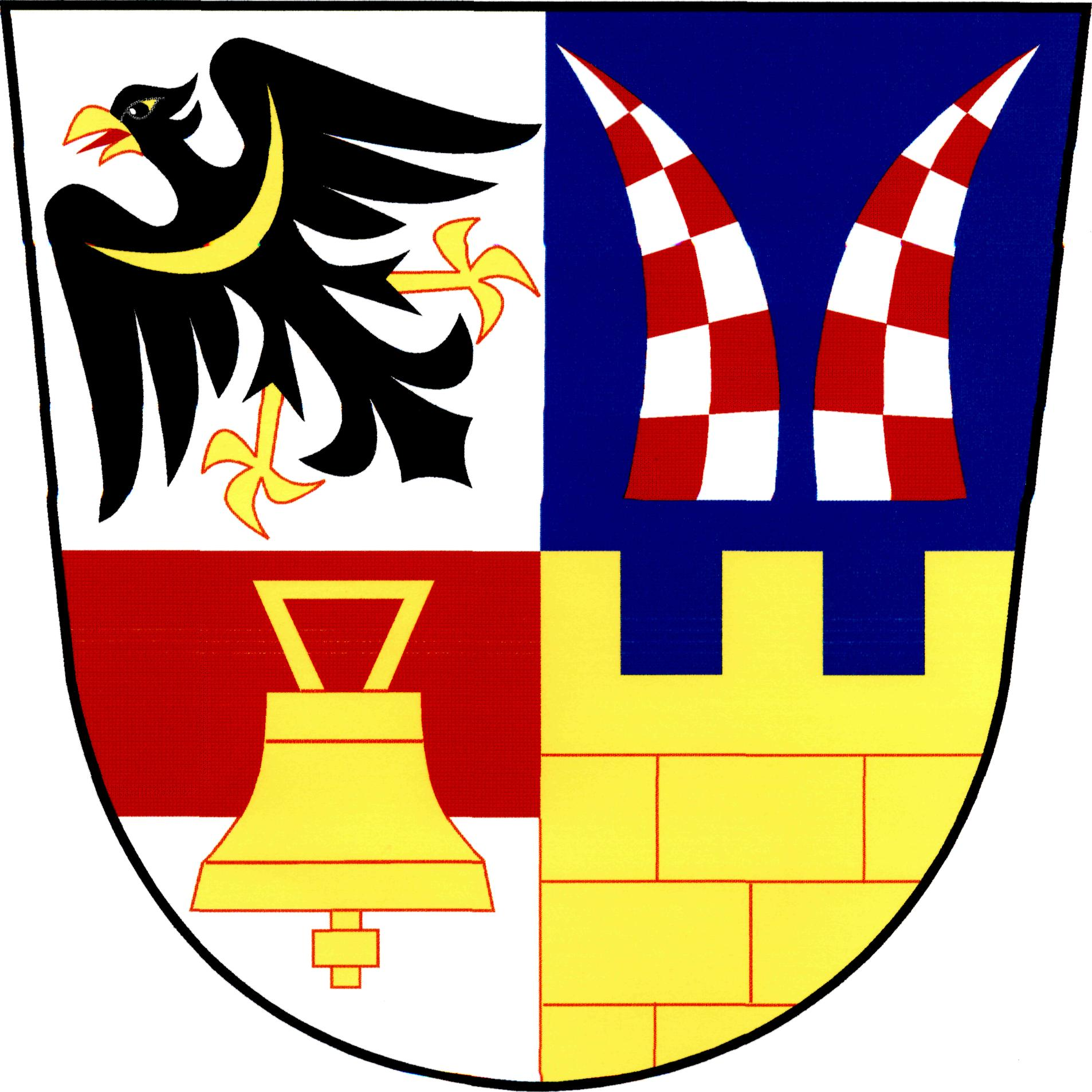
- Flag Coat of arms

- Location in the Czech Republic
- Coordinates: 50°12′19″N 14°28′20″E
- Country: Czech Republic
- Region: Central Bohemian
- District: Prague-East
- First mentioned: 1088

Area
  - Total: 7.81 km^{2} (3.02 sq mi)
- Elevation: 224 m (735 ft)

Population (2026-01-01)
  - Total: 3,071
  - Density: 393/km^{2} (1,020/sq mi)
- Time zone: UTC+1 (CET)
  - Summer (DST): UTC+2 (CEST)
- Postal code: 250 85
- Website: www.obecbast.cz

Bašť (Czech pronunciation: [ˈbaʃc]) is a municipality and village in Prague-East District in the Central Bohemian Region of the Czech Republic. It has about 3,100 inhabitants.

== Etymology ==
The original name of the settlement was Bášť (in old Czech written as Bášč). It was derived from the personal name Bášek (Czech diminutive of Bach).

== Geography ==
Bašť is located about 10 kilometres (6 mi) north of Prague. It lies mostly in the Central Elbe Table, but the western part of the municipal territory extends into the Prague Plateau. The highest point is at 300 m (984 ft) above sea level.

== History ==
The first written mention of Bašť is from 1088, when King Vratislaus II donated the village to the Vyšehrad Chapter. The village used to be made up of two settlements, Velký Bášt and Malý Bášt (later named Bašť and Baštěk), which gradually urbanistically merged.

== Demographics ==
Historical population

Year	Pop.	±%
1869	531	—
1880	600	+13.0%
1890	649	+8.2%
1900	646	−0.5%
1910	711	+10.1%

Year	Pop.	±%
1921	671	−5.6%
1930	793	+18.2%
1950	666	−16.0%
1961	670	+0.6%
1970	610	−9.0%

Year	Pop.	±%
1980	614	+0.7%
1991	555	−9.6%
2001	549	−1.1%
2011	1,657	+201.8%
2021	2,989	+80.4%

Source: Censuses

== Transport ==
The I/9 road (which connects the D8 motorway with Česká Lípa and the Czech–German border) runs along the eastern municipal border. The D8 motorway runs west of Bašť just outside the municipal territory.

== Sights ==
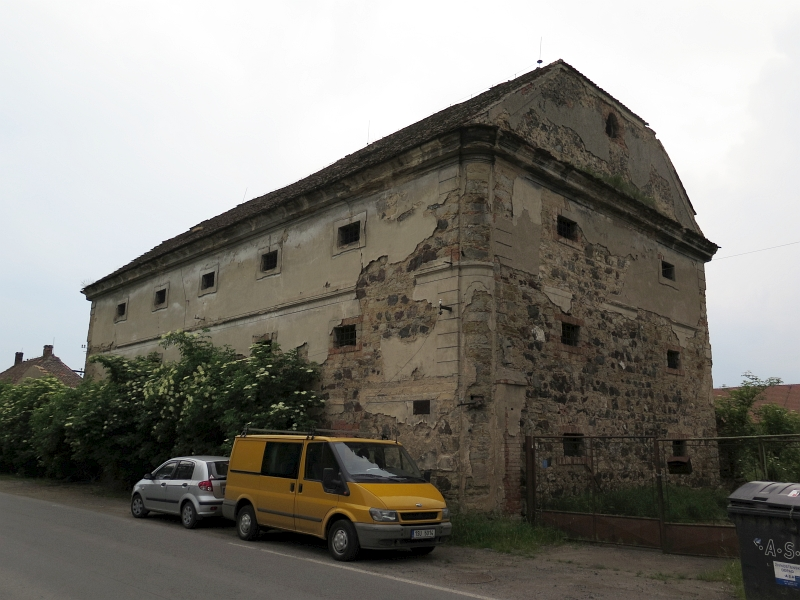
Baroque granary

There are no notable monuments in the municipality. Among the protected cultural monuments are a Baroque granary and terrain remains of a fortress that stood here in the 13th–15th centuries.
