= Shahr-e Viran, West Azerbaijan =

Shahr-e Viran شهرويران
- Village
- Location within Iran
- Coordinates: 37°36′46″N 44°42′57″E
- Country: Iran
- Province: West Azerbaijan
- County: Urmia
- Bakhsh: Silvaneh
- Rural District: Targavar

Population (2006)
  - Total: 19
- Time zone: UTC+3:30 (IRST)
  - Summer (DST): UTC+4:30 (IRDT)

Shahr-e Viran (Persian: شهرويران, also Romanized as Shahr-e Vīrān; also known as Shahr-e Vīnān) is a village in Targavar Rural District, Silvaneh District, Urmia County, West Azerbaijan Province, Iran. At the 2006 census, its population was 19, in 4 families.
