= Basut-e Bala =

Basut-e Bala بسوت بالا
- Village
- Location within Iran
- Coordinates: 25°33′21″N 61°24′22″E
- Country: Iran
- Province: Sistan and Baluchestan
- County: Chabahar
- Bakhsh: Dashtiari
- Rural District: Bahu Kalat

Population (2006)
  - Total: 226
- Time zone: UTC+3:30 (IRST)
  - Summer (DST): UTC+4:30 (IRDT)

Basut-e Bala (Persian: بسوت بالا, also Romanized as Basūt-e Bālā and Besūt-e Bālā; also known as Basot, Bāst, Basūt, and Besūt) is a village in Bahu Kalat Rural District, Dashtiari District, Chabahar County, Sistan and Baluchestan Province, Iran. At the 2006 census, its population was 226, in 43 families.
