= Bast (surname) =

Bast is a surname. Notable people with the surname include:

- Dieter Bast (born 1951), German footballer
- Jason Bast (born 1989), Canadian ice hockey player
- Joseph Bast (born 1958), CEO of the Heartland Institute
- Ørnulf Bast (1907–1974), Norwegian sculptor and painter
- Ryan Bast (born 1975), Canadian ice hockey player
- William Bast (1931–2015), American screenwriter and writer
