= Leila Esfandyari =

Iranian mountain climber (1971–2011)

- Born: February 16, 1971; Karaj, Pahlavi Iran (now Iran)
- Died: July 22, 2011 (aged 40); Gasherbrum II, Pakistan
- Other name: Leyla Esfandiari Kajoori Rad
- Occupation: Climber

Leila Esfandyari (Persian: لیلا اسفندیاری; February 16, 1971 – July 22, 2011) was an Iranian climber. Esfandyari was the first Iranian woman to reach the summit of Nanga Parbat in the Himalayas, the world's ninth highest peak with an altitude of 8,125 metres and one of the deadliest peaks. Esfandyari is regarded as a pioneer in the women's mountain climbing movement, being one of the few women in the world to have completed a similar attempt.

== Education and career ==
Leila Esfandyari was born on February 16, 1971, in Karaj, Pahlavi Iran (now Iran). She was raised and educated in Tehran, Iran, receiving a bachelor's degree in microbiology. She worked as a microbiologist in a Tehran hospital before she left her job to climb K2 in the Himalayas in 2010.

== Death ==
On July 22, 2011, she completed the ascent to Gasherbrum II, one of the highest peaks in the Karakoram range of the Himalayas. Minutes after, on the way down, her foot slipped on the ice and she fell 300 meters down the mountain. In accordance with her wishes, her body has remained on the mountain.

A statue was erected in her memory in the Behesht-e-Zahra Cemetery in Tehran.
