= Howmeh Rural District (Deylam County) =

Rural district in Bushehr province, Iran

Howmeh Rural District Persian: دهستان حومه
- Rural District
- Location within Iran
- Coordinates: 30°07′N 50°15′E
- Country: Iran
- Province: Bushehr
- County: Deylam
- District: Central
- Established: 1995
- Capital: Ameri

Population (2016)
  - Total: 2,395
- Time zone: UTC+3:30 (IRST)

Howmeh Rural District (Persian: دهستان حومه) is in the Central District of Deylam County, Bushehr province, Iran. Its capital is the village of Ameri.

== Demographics ==
=== Population ===
At the time of the 2006 National Census, the rural district's population was 2,470 in 499 households. There were 2,507 inhabitants in 680 households at the following census of 2011. The 2016 census measured the population of the rural district as 2,395 in 680 households. The most populous of its six villages was Ameri, with 1,558 people.

=== Other villages in the rural district ===
- Bidu
- Konar Kuh
