= Esfandiar (name) =

Esfandiar (Persian: اسفنديار, Esfandiyār), also transliterated as Esfandyar, Isfandiyor, Isfandiar, Isfandiyar or Esfandiar, is a common Persian given name and may refer to the following:

- Esfandiyār, the legendary Iranian hero
- Esfandiar Ahmadieh, Iranian animation filmmaker
- Esfandiar Baharmast, American soccer referee
- Esfandiar Monfaredzadeh, Iranian composer
- Esfandiar Rahim Mashaei, Iranian politician
- Esfandiar Ekhtiyari, Zoroastrian Iranian politician
- Esfandiar Zarnegar, Iranian fencer
- Isfandiyar Khan Beg, Mughal faujdar of Sylhet Sarkar
- Kulu Isfandiyar, Sarbadar

== See also ==
- Esfandiari (disambiguation)
