= Basut-e Hajji Hasan =

Basut-e Hajji Hasan بسوت حاجي حسن
- Village
- Location within Iran
- Coordinates: 25°32′23″N 61°25′06″E
- Country: Iran
- Province: Sistan and Baluchestan
- County: Chabahar
- Bakhsh: Dashtiari
- Rural District: Bahu Kalat

Population (2006)
  - Total: 806
- Time zone: UTC+3:30 (IRST)
  - Summer (DST): UTC+4:30 (IRDT)

Basut-e Hajji Hasan (Persian: بسوت حاجي حسن, also Romanized as Basūt-e Ḩājjī Ḩasan; also known as Basūt and Basūt-e Pā’īn) is a village in Bahu Kalat Rural District, Dashtiari District, Chabahar County, Sistan and Baluchestan Province, Iran. At the 2006 census, its population was 806, in 151 families.
