= Iranian Offshore Oil Company =

Iranian petroleum business

- Type: State-owned enterprise
- Industry: Oil and gas
- Founded: 1981; 45 years ago
- Headquarters: Tehran, Iran
- Key people: Ahmadreza Rasti (CEO)
- Products: Oil natural gas
- Owner: National Iranian Oil Company
- Website: iooc.ir

The Iranian Offshore Oil Company (IOOC; Persian: شرکت نفت فلات قاره ایران) is a subsidiary of the National Iranian Oil Company. IOOC, an independent legal entity, is based in Tehran and operates in southern Iran. Its activities cover important areas of the Persian Gulf and its main operations are in Bushehr Province and on Kharg Island, Sirri Island and Lavan Island.

== History ==
After Iranian Revolution, all partnership contracts with aforementioned companies were abolished, and a year later, the Iranian Offshore Oil Company (IOOC) was established by combining those companies.

During the Iraq-Iran War, the IOOC suffered considerable damages to offshore and onshore facilities.

== Operations ==
The IOOC operations in the Persian Gulf are divided into two zones: the northern zone which includes oilfields around Kharg Island and ones near Iranian port of Bahregan. The Southern zone of the company's operations includes areas near islands Sirri, Lavan, Kish, Qeshm.

The IOOC has the production capacity of over 640,000 b/d.

In 2012, IOOC signed a contract worth $6.6 billion, with Iran's power projects management company (MAPNA) for developing the Forouz B gas field in the Persian Gulf and generating electricity from the produced natural gas.

In early 2015, IOOC acquired the "world's largest oil tanker" with a capacity of 2.2 million barrels of crude oil. It is named "Persian Gulf". South Korea's Samsung started building this floating storage unit (FSU) in 2008 and finished it at a cost of about $300 million.
