= Bast, Afghanistan =

Bast بست
- Location in Afghanistan
- Coordinates: 34°52′N 67°33′E
- Country: Afghanistan
- Province: Bamyan
- Time zone: + 4.30

Bast (Persian: بست) is a village in Bamyan Province in northern-central Afghanistan.

== See also ==
- Bamyan Province
