= Liravi-ye Jonubi Rural District =

Rural district in Bushehr province, Iran

Liravi-ye Jonubi Rural District Persian: دهستان ليراوئ جنوبي
- Rural District
- Location within Iran
- Coordinates: 29°51′N 50°19′E
- Country: Iran
- Province: Bushehr
- County: Deylam
- District: Emam Hasan
- Established: 1991
- Capital: Emam Hasan

Population (2016)
  - Total: 1,903
- Time zone: UTC+3:30 (IRST)

Liravi-ye Jonubi Rural District (Persian: دهستان ليراوئ جنوبي) is in Emam Hasan District (Note: Formerly Bahrgan District) of Deylam County, Bushehr province, Iran. It is administered from the city of Emam Hasan.

== Demographics ==
=== Population ===
At the time of the 2006 National Census, the rural district's population was 1,763 in 401 households. There were 1,804 inhabitants in 460 households at the following census of 2011. The 2016 census measured the population of the rural district as 1,903 in 508 households. The most populous of its 10 villages was Hesar, with 909 people.

=== Other villages in the rural district ===
- Chah Talekh
- Leylateyn
