= Liravi-ye Miyani Rural District =

Rural district in Bushehr province, Iran

Liravi-ye Miyani Rural District Persian: دهستان ليراوئ مياني
- Rural District
- Location within Iran
- Coordinates: 29°54′N 50°30′E
- Country: Iran
- Province: Bushehr
- County: Deylam
- District: Emam Hasan
- Established: 1995
- Capital: Valfajar

Population (2016)
  - Total: 232
- Time zone: UTC+3:30 (IRST)

Liravi-ye Miyani Rural District (Persian: دهستان ليراوئ مياني) is in Emam Hasan District (Note: Formerly Bahrgan District) of Deylam County, Bushehr province, Iran. Its capital is the village of Valfajar.

== Demographics ==
=== Population ===
At the time of the 2006 National Census, the rural district's population was 464 in 97 households. There were 313 inhabitants in 69 households at the following census of 2011. The 2016 census measured the population of the rural district as 232 in 62 households. The most populous of its nine villages was Valfajar, with 138 people.
