= Liravi-ye Shomali Rural District =

Rural district in Bushehr province, Iran

Liravi-ye Shomali Rural District Persian: دهستان ليراوئ شمالي
- Rural District
- Location within Iran
- Coordinates: 30°04′N 50°24′E
- Country: Iran
- Province: Bushehr
- County: Deylam
- District: Central
- Established: 1986
- Capital: Siah Makan-e Bozorg

Population (2016)
  - Total: 1,830
- Time zone: UTC+3:30 (IRST)

Liravi-ye Shomali Rural District (Persian: دهستان ليراوئ شمالي) (Note: Formerly Liravi Rural District (دهستان ليراوئ)) is in the Central District of Deylam County, Bushehr province, Iran. Its capital is the village of Siah Makan-e Bozorg.

== Demographics ==
=== Population ===
At the time of the 2006 National Census, the rural district's population was 2,397 in 478 households. There were 2,048 inhabitants in 472 households at the following census of 2011. The 2016 census measured the population of the rural district as was 1,830 in 496 households. The most populous of its 15 villages was Siah Makan-e Bozorg, with 702 people.

=== Other villages in the rural district ===
- Boneh-ye Esmail
- Gaz Luri
