= Emam Hasan District =

District in Bushehr province, Iran

Emam Hasan District Persian: بخش امام حسن
- District
- Location within Iran
- Coordinates: 29°52′N 50°25′E
- Country: Iran
- Province: Bushehr
- County: Deylam
- Established: 1995
- Capital: Emam Hasan

Population (2016)
  - Total: 4,866
- Time zone: UTC+3:30 (IRST)

Emam Hasan District (Persian: بخش امام حسن) (Note: Formerly Bahrgan District (بخش بهرگان)) is in Deylam County, Bushehr province, Iran. Its capital is the city of Emam Hasan.

== Demographics ==
=== Population ===
At the time of the 2006 National Census, the district's population was 4,383 in 959 households. The following census in 2011 counted 4,615 people in 1,147 households. The 2016 census measured the population of the district as 4,866 inhabitants living in 1,319 households.

=== Administrative divisions ===
Emam Hasan District Population
Administrative Divisions	2006	2011	2016
Liravi-ye Jonubi RD	1,763	1,804	1,903
Liravi-ye Miyani RD	464	313	232
Emam Hasan (city)	2,156	2,498	2,731
Total	4,383	4,615	4,866
RD = Rural District
