= Central District (Deylam County) =

District in Bushehr province, Iran

Central District (Deylam County) Persian: بخش مرکزی شهرستان دیلم
- District
- Location within Iran
- Coordinates: 30°07′N 50°21′E
- Country: Iran
- Province: Bushehr
- County: Deylam
- Established: 1995
- Capital: Bandar Deylam

Population (2016)
  - Total: 29,955
- Time zone: UTC+3:30 (IRST)

The Central District of Deylam County (Persian: بخش مرکزی شهرستان دیلم) is in Bushehr province, Iran. Its capital is the city of Bandar Deylam.

== Demographics ==
=== Population ===
At the time of the 2006 National Census, the district's population was 24,696 in 5,403 households. The following census in 2011 counted 26,948 people in 6,710 households. The 2016 census measured the population of the district as 29,955 inhabitants living in 8,535 households.

=== Administrative divisions ===
Central District (Deylam County) Population
| Administrative Divisions | 2006 | 2011 | 2016 |
|---|---|---|---|
| Howmeh RD | 2,470 | 2,507 | 2,395 |
| Liravi-ye Shomali RD (Note: Formerly Liravi Rural District) | 2,397 | 2,048 | 1,830 |
| Bandar Deylam (city) | 19,829 | 22,393 | 25,730 |
| Total | 24,696 | 26,948 | 29,955 |
RD = Rural District
