= Deylam County =

County in Bushehr province, Iran

Deylam County Persian: شهرستان دیلم
- County
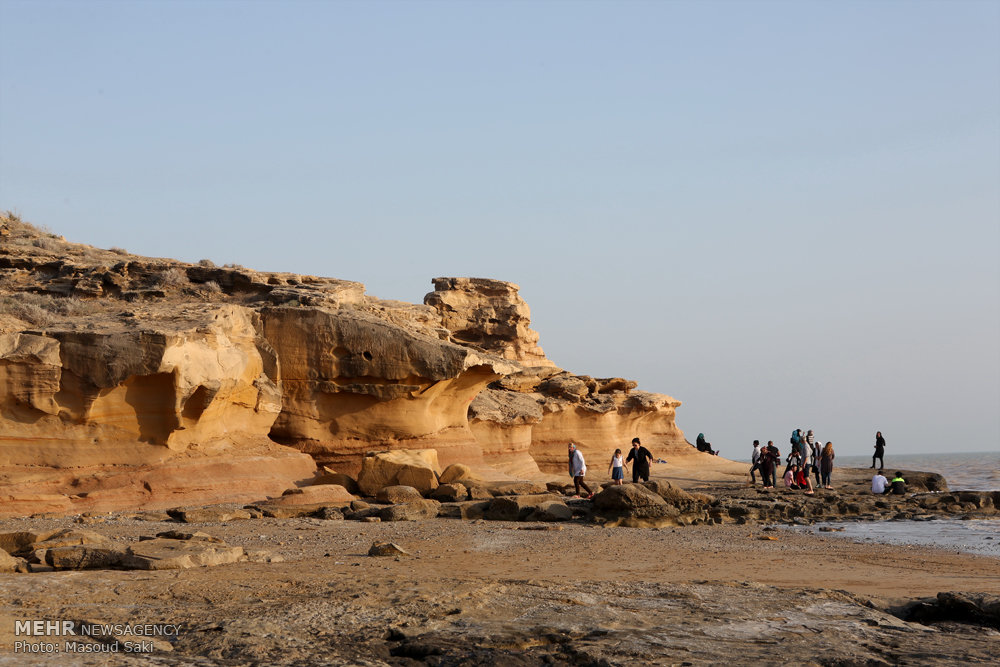
- Beach at the city of Emam Hasan

- Location of Deylam County in Bushehr province (top, yellow)

- Location of Bushehr province in Iran
- Coordinates: 30°00′N 50°22′E
- Country: Iran
- Province: Bushehr
- Established: 1995
- Capital: Bandar Deylam
- Districts: Central, Emam Hasan

Population (2016)
  - Total: 34,828
- Time zone: UTC+3:30 (IRST)

Deylam County (Persian: شهرستان دیلم) is in Bushehr province, Iran. Its capital is the city of Bandar Deylam.

== Demographics ==
=== Population ===
At the time of the 2006 National Census, the county's population was 29,079 in 6,362 households. The following census in 2011 counted 31,570 people in 7,847 households. The 2016 census measured the population of the county as 34,828 in 9,856 households.

=== Administrative divisions ===
Deylam County's population history and administrative structure over three consecutive censuses are shown in the following table.

Deylam County Population
Administrative Divisions	2006	2011	2016
Central District	24,696	26,948	29,955
Howmeh RD	2,470	2,507	2,395
Liravi-ye Shomali RD (Note: Formerly Liravi Rural District)	2,397	2,048	1,830
Bandar Deylam (city)	19,829	22,393	25,730
Emam Hasan District (Note: Formerly Bahrgan District)	4,383	4,615	4,866
Liravi-ye Jonubi RD	1,763	1,804	1,903
Liravi-ye Miyani RD	464	313	232
Emam Hasan (city)	2,156	2,498	2,731
Total	29,079	31,570	34,828
RD = Rural District

== See also ==
Media related to Deylam County at Wikimedia Commons
